= Meland Municipality =

Former municipality in Hordaland, Norway

Meland Municipality Meland kommune
- Former municipality
- Mæland herred (historic name)
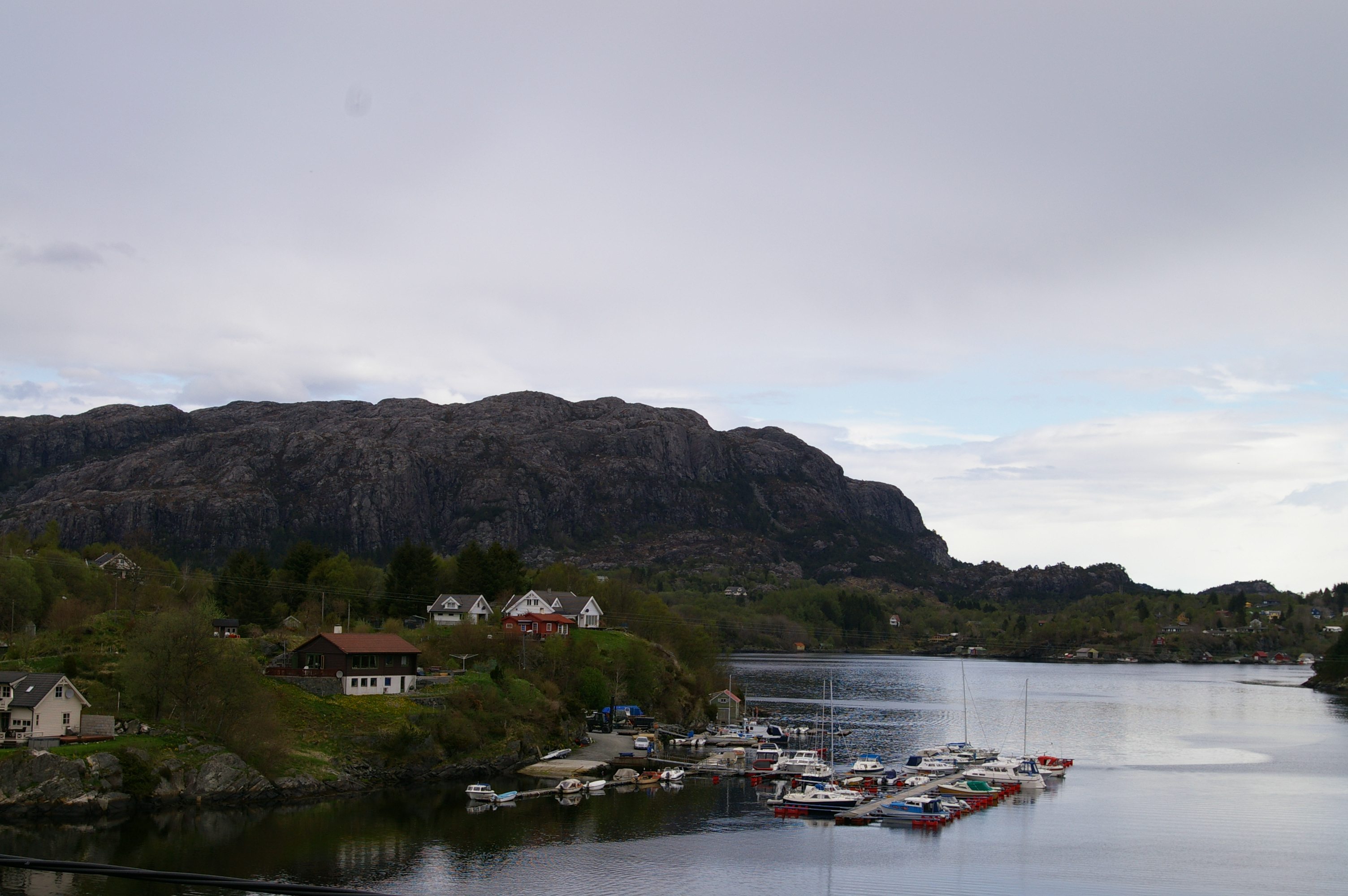
- View of the mountain Eldsfjellet in northern Meland

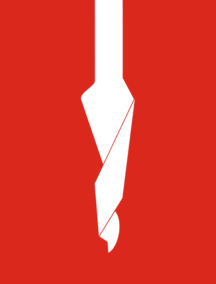
- Flag Coat of arms

- Hordaland within Norway

- Meland within Hordaland
- Coordinates: 60°33′51″N 05°07′07″E
- Country: Norway
- County: Hordaland
- District: Nordhordland
- Established: 15 Oct 1923
  - Preceded by: Alversund Municipality
- Disestablished: 1 Jan 2020
  - Succeeded by: Alver Municipality
- Administrative centre: Frekhaug

Government
  - Mayor (2015–2019): Øyvind Helland Oddekalv (Ap)

Area (upon dissolution)
  - Total: 92.58 km^{2} (35.75 sq mi)
  - Land: 87.53 km^{2} (33.80 sq mi)
  - Water: 5.05 km^{2} (1.95 sq mi) 5.5%
  - Rank: #386 in Norway
- Highest elevation: 324.4 m (1,064 ft)

Population (2019)
  - Total: 8,187
  - Rank: #136 in Norway
  - Density: 88.4/km^{2} (229/sq mi)
  - Change (10 years): ▲ +26.4%
- Demonym: Melandsbu

Official language
  - Norwegian form: Nynorsk
- Time zone: UTC+01:00 (CET)
  - Summer (DST): UTC+02:00 (CEST)
- ISO 3166 code: NO-1256

Meland is a former municipality in the old Hordaland county, Norway. The 92.58-square-kilometre (35.75 sq mi) municipality existed from 1923 until its dissolution in 2020. The area is now part of Alver Municipality in the traditional district of Nordhordland in Vestland county. The administrative centre was the village of Frekhaug. Other villages in the municipality included Hjartås, Holme, Io, Krossneset, Meland, and Rossland. The municipality was located about 30 minutes north of the city of Bergen in Western Norway.

Prior to its dissolution in 2020, the 92.58-square-kilometre (35.75 sq mi) municipality was the 386th largest by area out of the 422 municipalities in Norway. Meland Municipality was the 136th most populous municipality in Norway with a population of about 8,187. The municipality's population density was 88.4 inhabitants per square kilometre (229/sq mi) and its population had increased by 26.4% over the previous 10-year period.

== General information ==
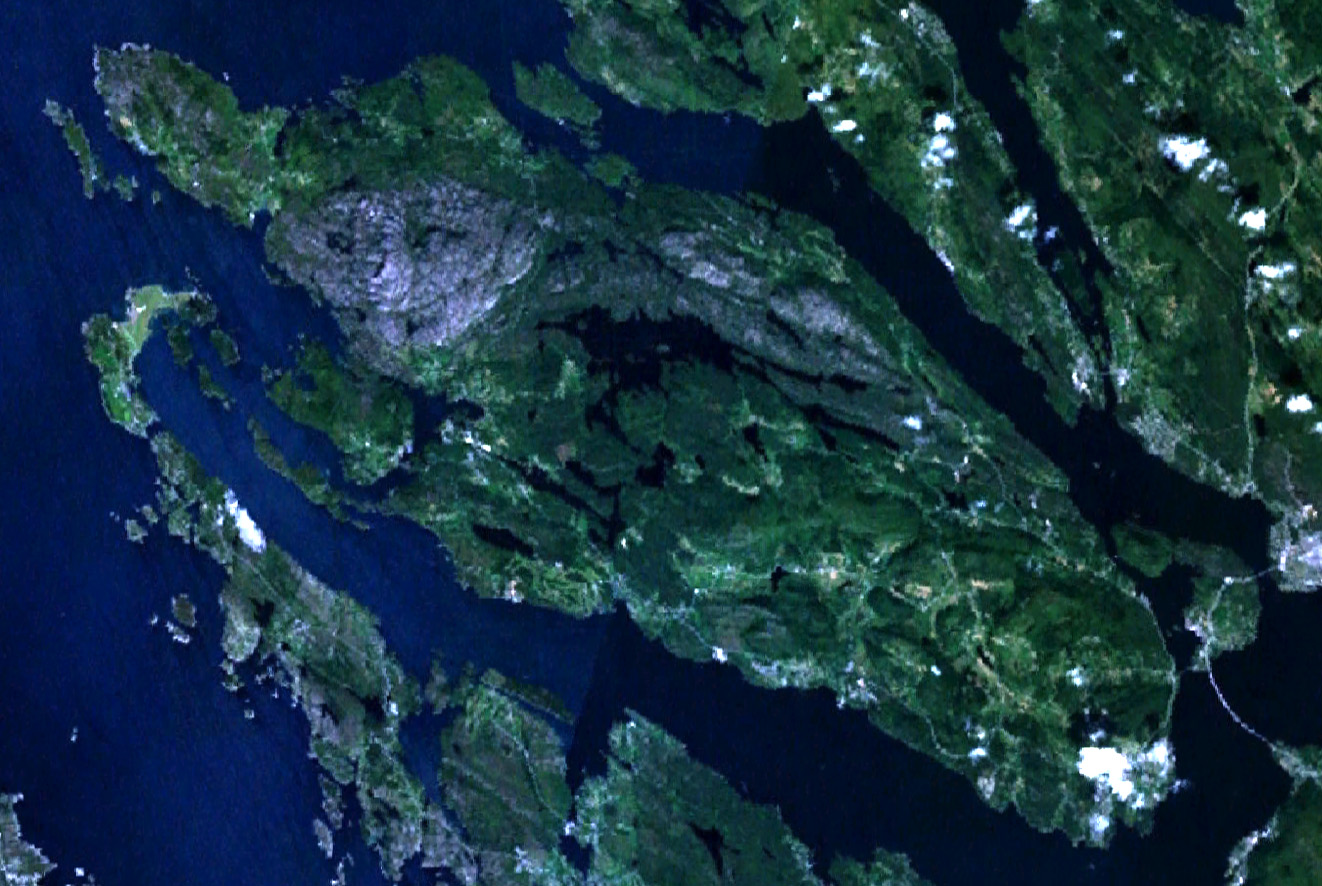
Satellite view of the island of Holsnøy

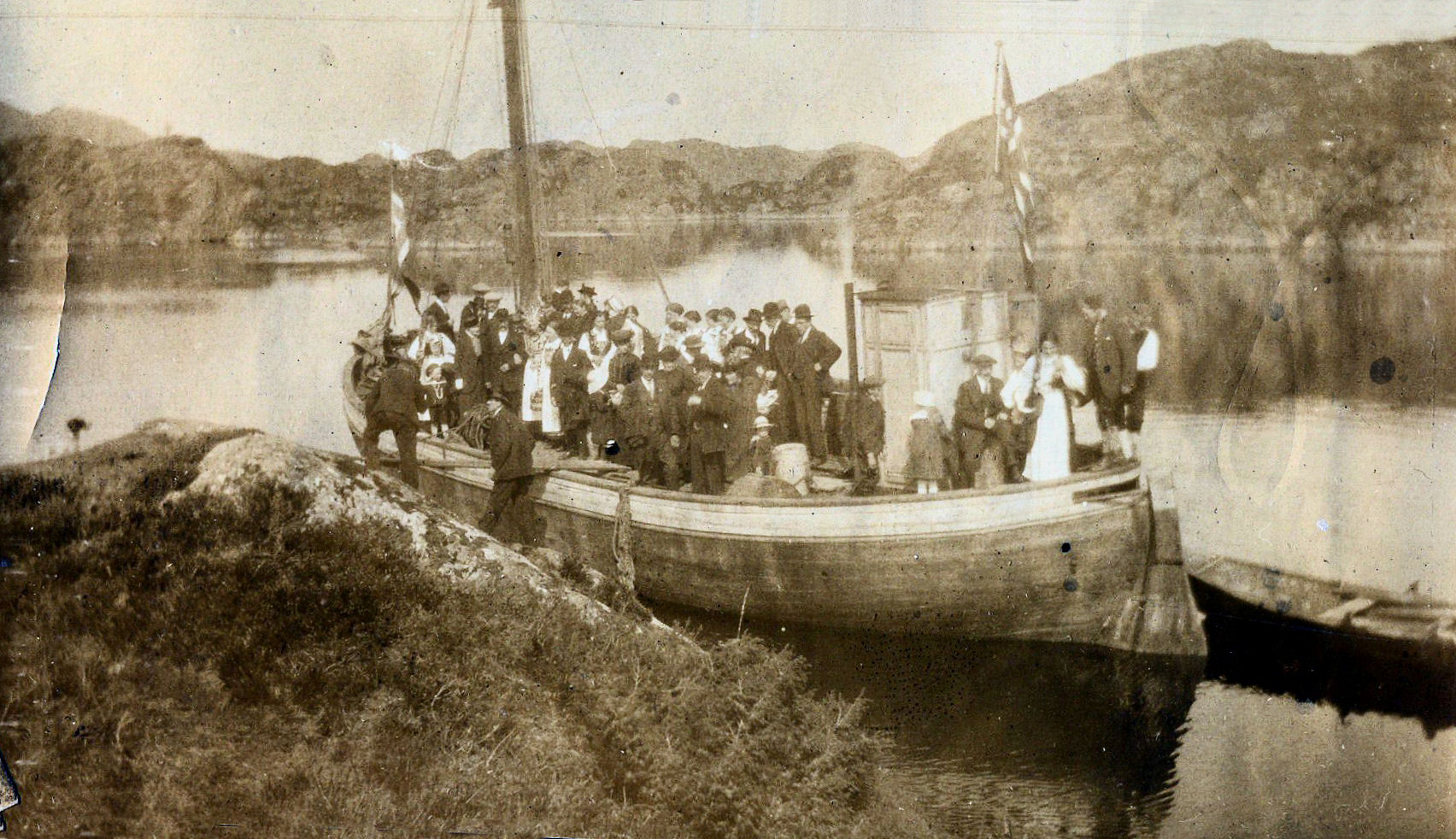
View of a wedding boat at Holsnøy

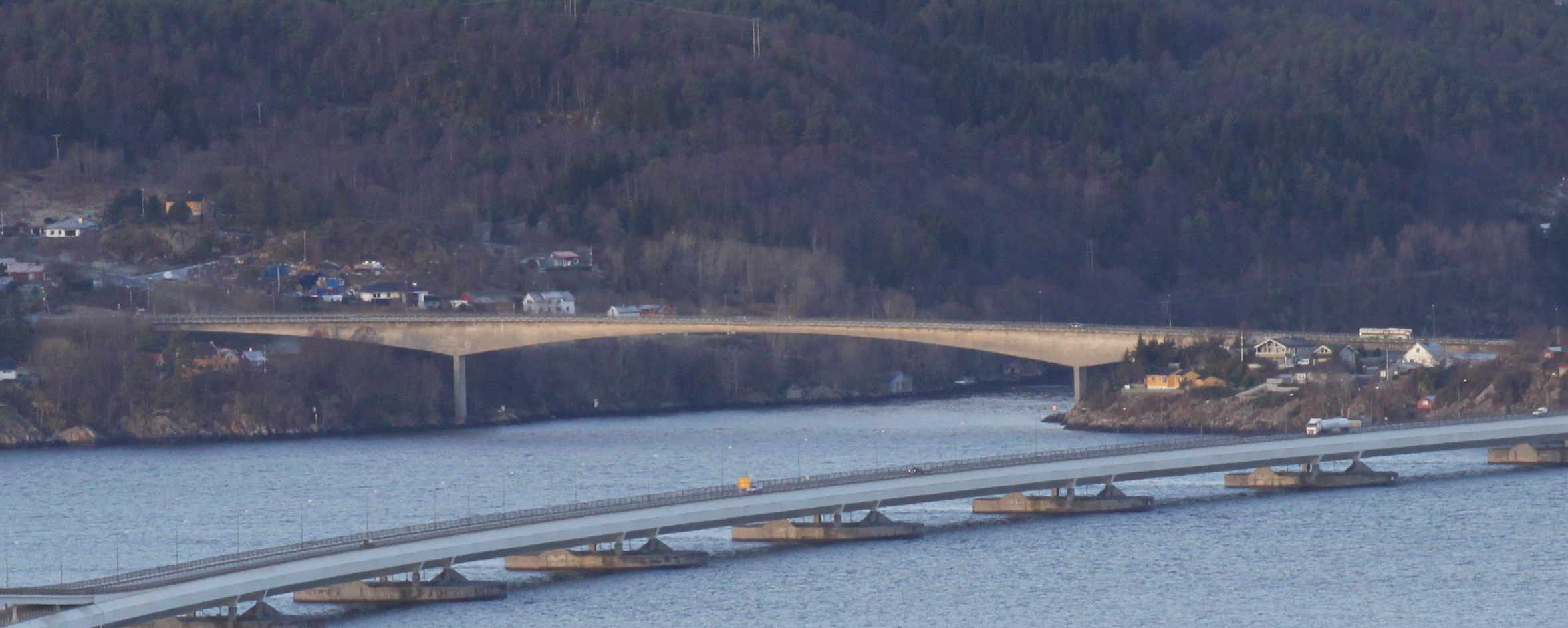
View of Krossnessund Bridge (back) and Nordhordland Bridge (front)

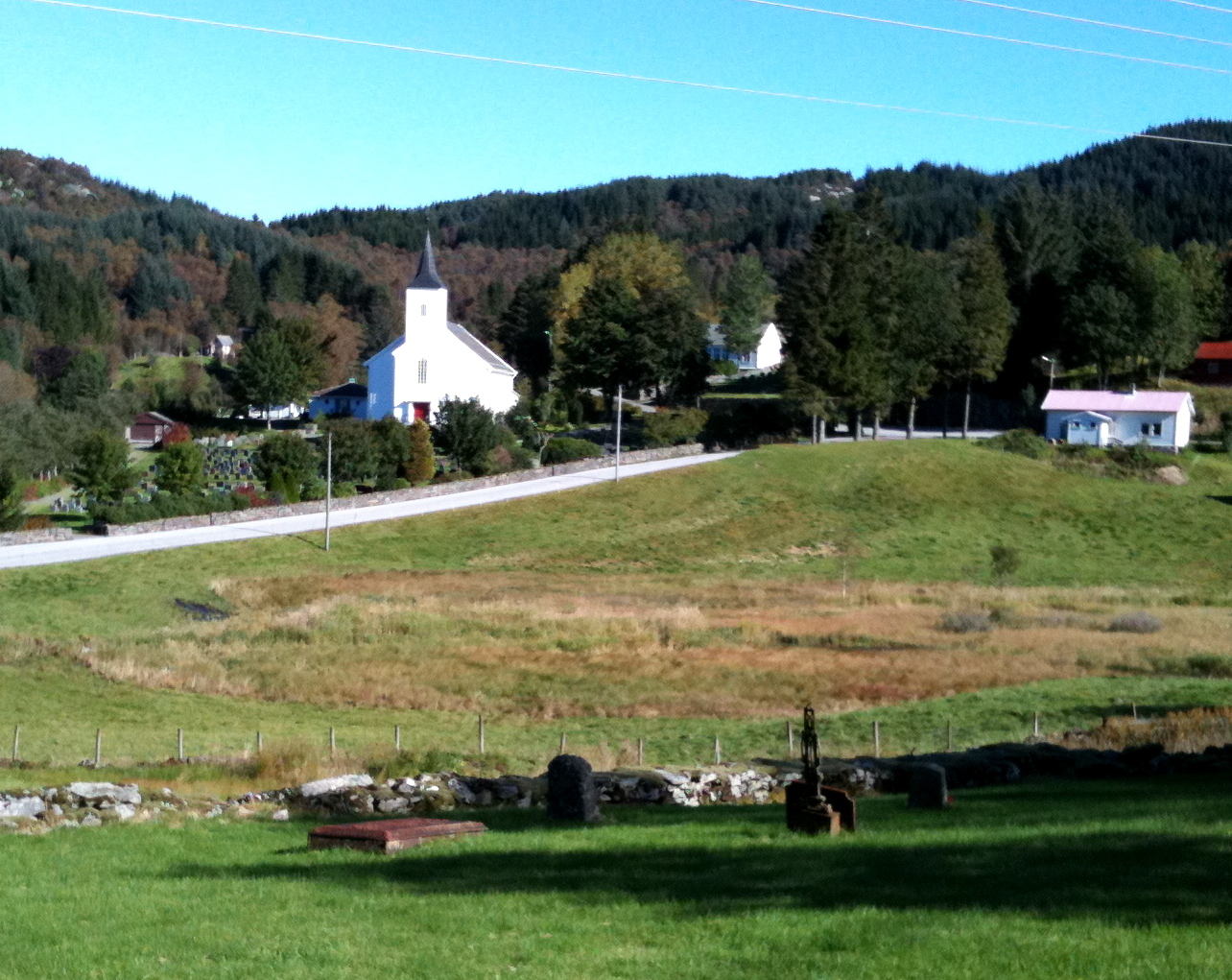
View of the local church

On 15 October 1923, Alversund Municipality was divided into two separate municipalities: the western part (population: 1,716) became the new Meland Municipality and the eastern part (population: 1,771) remained as a smaller Alversund Municipality. Meland Municipality was one of many municipalities in Norway that were created for geographical reasons: Meland was separated from the rest of Alversund by the Radfjorden, and transportation between the different parts of the municipality was unreliable and time-consuming. The creation of the municipality was approved in 1922, and the first election for the municipal council was held 23 August 1923, with the municipality becoming official on 15 October 1923. Meland Municipality encompassed the southern two-thirds of the island of Holsnøy (the northern third belonged to Herdla Municipality), a small area on the northeast coast of the island of Askøy, as well as some very small surrounding islands.

In 1962, the Schei Committee concluded its survey of the organization of Norway's municipalities. The committee recommended several changes in the areas surrounding Meland Municipality. Hamre Municipality was to be dissolved and its lands were divided between Lindås Municipality, Osterøy Municipality, and Meland Municipality. Also Herdla Municipality would also be dissolved and its territories were divided between Askøy Municipality, Øygarden Municipality, and Meland Municipality. This would result in the follow border adjustments:

- the northern part of Holsnøy island and the minor island of Øpsøy (population: 811) were moved from Herdla Municipality to Meland Municipality
- the island of Flatøy (population: 166) was transferred from Hamre Municipality to Meland Municipality.
- the parts of Meland Municipality located on the island of Askøy were transferred to Askøy Municipality.

Hordaland county approved the changes, and they came into effect on 1 January 1964. A proposal to change the name of Meland Municipality to "Holsenøy" was rejected.

On 1 January 2020, the neighboring Meland Municipality, Radøy Municipality, and Lindås Municipality were merged into the new Alver Municipality. Historically, this municipality was part of the old Hordaland county. On 1 January 2020, the new Alver Municipality became a part of the newly-formed Vestland county (after Hordaland and Sogn og Fjordane counties were merged).

=== Name ===
The municipality (originally the parish) is named after the old Meland farm (Old Norse: Meðalland) in the south-central part of the island of Holsnøy. The first element is meðal which means "middle" or "amongst". The last element is land which means "land" or "farm". Therefore, the name as a whole roughly means "the farm that is located in the middle (of the island)". Historically, the name was spelled Mæland.

=== Coat of arms ===
The coat of arms was granted on 15 May 1987 and it was in use until 1 January 2020 when the municipality was dissolved. The official blazon is "Gules, an auger palewise issuant from chief argent" (Norwegian: På raud grunn ein kvit navar-spiss som vender nedover). This means the arms have a red field (background) and the charge is a local type of auger which is used in carpentry. The auger has a tincture of argent which means it is commonly colored white, but if it is made out of metal, then silver is used. This design was chosen because in the 1850s, auger manufacturing started in the municipality, and the local drills were considered to be high quality. The design was meant to symbolize and emphasize the local traditions to be proud of and skills to be keep alive. The arms were designed by Inge Rotevatn. The municipal flag has the same design as the coat of arms.

=== Churches ===
The Church of Norway had one parish (sokn) within Meland Municipality. It is part of the Nordhordland prosti (deanery) in the Diocese of Bjørgvin.

Churches in Meland Municipality
| Parish (sokn) | Church name | Location of the church | Year built |
|---|---|---|---|
| Meland | Meland Church | Meland | 1866 |

== Geography ==
Meland Municipality consisted of a number of islands. The largest was Holsnøy, which has an area of 89 square kilometres (34 sq mi), out of a total area of 93 square kilometres (36 sq mi) for the entire municipality. Holsnøy was located between the island of Radøy and the Lindås peninsula to its north, the Åsane peninsula in Bergen Municipality to its east, the island of Askøy to its south, and the archipelago of Øygarden Municipality to its west. It was surrounded by fjords, namely (clockwise from north) Mangerfjorden, Radfjorden, Salhusfjorden, Herdlefjorden, and Hjeltefjorden. The second largest island in the municipality was Flatøy, located west of Holsnøy. The municipality also encompassed a number of minor islands. The highest point in the municipality was the 324.4-metre (1,064 ft) tall mountain Eldsfjellet, located just north of the village of Rossland on the island of Holsnøy.

The administrative centre of the municipality was the village of Frekhaug, which was also its largest settlement. Frekhaug was located in the south-eastern part of Holsnøy, and its urban area had a population of 1649 as of 2012. An additional two urban areas were located in the municipality: Krossneset on Flatøy (population 468) and Holme (population 663).

== Transport ==
As an island municipality, the road network of Meland depended upon bridges to connect it to the mainland. The Nordhordland Bridge, which spans the Salhusfjorden between Flatøy and Klauvaneset in Bergen, connected Meland to the mainland. The bridge is the main road northwards from Bergen, and is part of European route E39. The Krossnessundet Bridge, which is part of Fv 564, connects Flatøy to Holsnøy, the largest island of the municipality. The Krossnessundet Bridge opened in 1977, while the Nordhordland Bridge dates from 1994. The Hagelsund Bridge connects the island of Flatøy to Knarvik on the Lindås peninsula to the east.

== History ==
The area of Meland Municipality had several traces of early settlement, including remnants of stone houses, terraced walls, and farms. Holmeknappen (from the 18th century) was restored in 1992, and it includes equipment for barrel production and salting herring. Meland has been a church site since the mid-13th century. The stave church on this site was in use until 1616 when a new wooden church was built on the same site. That church was demolished in 1816 and the new (present) Meland Church was erected in 1816.

== Population ==
Historical population
| Year | 1923 | 1930 | 1946 | 1951 | 1960 | 1970 | 1980 | 1990 | 2000 | 2010 | 2019 |
| Pop. | 1,716 | 1,768 | 1,876 | 1,930 | 1,721 | 2,694 | 3,508 | 4,534 | 5,353 | 6,631 | 8,187 |
| ±% p.a. | — | +0.43% | +0.37% | +0.57% | −1.27% | +4.58% | +2.68% | +2.60% | +1.67% | +2.16% | +2.37% |
Note: The municipal borders were changed in 1964, causing a significant change in the population. Source: Statistics Norway and Norwegian Historical Data Centre

== Government ==
While it existed, Meland Municipality was responsible for primary education (through 10th grade), outpatient health services, senior citizen services, welfare and other social services, zoning, economic development, and municipal roads and utilities. The municipality was governed by a municipal council of directly elected representatives. The mayor was indirectly elected by a vote of the municipal council. The municipality was under the jurisdiction of the Bergen District Court and the Gulating Court of Appeal.

=== Municipal council ===
The municipal council (Kommunestyre) of Meland Municipality was made up of representatives that were elected to four year terms. The tables below show the historical composition of the council by political party.

Meland kommunestyre 2015–2019
| Party name (in Nynorsk) | Number of representatives |
|---|---|
| Labour Party (Arbeidarpartiet) | 7 |
| Progress Party (Framstegspartiet) | 4 |
| Green Party (Miljøpartiet Dei Grøne) | 2 |
| Conservative Party (Høgre) | 5 |
| Christian Democratic Party (Kristeleg Folkeparti) | 3 |
| Centre Party (Senterpartiet) | 3 |
| Liberal Party (Venstre) | 2 |
| The People's Will Local List (Bygdelista Folkeviljen) | 1 |
| Total number of members: | 27 |
Note: On 1 January 2020, Meland Municipality became part of Alver Municipality.

Meland kommunestyre 2011–2015
| Party name (in Nynorsk) | Number of representatives |
|---|---|
| Labour Party (Arbeidarpartiet) | 5 |
| Progress Party (Framstegspartiet) | 4 |
| Green Party (Miljøpartiet Dei Grøne) | 1 |
| Conservative Party (Høgre) | 6 |
| Christian Democratic Party (Kristeleg Folkeparti) | 3 |
| Centre Party (Senterpartiet) | 4 |
| Liberal Party (Venstre) | 2 |
| Joint list of the Red Party (Raudt) and the Socialist Left Party (Sosialistisk Venstreparti) | 2 |
| Total number of members: | 27 |

Meland kommunestyre 2007–2011
| Party name (in Nynorsk) | Number of representatives |
|---|---|
| Labour Party (Arbeidarpartiet) | 4 |
| Progress Party (Framstegspartiet) | 5 |
| Conservative Party (Høgre) | 5 |
| Christian Democratic Party (Kristeleg Folkeparti) | 3 |
| Centre Party (Senterpartiet) | 6 |
| Liberal Party (Venstre) | 2 |
| Joint list of the Red Party, Socialist Left Party, and Social Democrats in Meland (Fellesliste: Raudt, Sosialistisk Venstre, og Sosialdemokratar i Meland) | 2 |
| Total number of members: | 27 |

Meland kommunestyre 2003–2007
| Party name (in Nynorsk) | Number of representatives |
|---|---|
| Labour Party (Arbeidarpartiet) | 6 |
| Progress Party (Framstegspartiet) | 4 |
| Conservative Party (Høgre) | 6 |
| Christian Democratic Party (Kristeleg Folkeparti) | 4 |
| Centre Party (Senterpartiet) | 2 |
| Liberal Party (Venstre) | 2 |
| Joint list of the Red Party, Socialist Left Party, and Social Democrats in Meland (Fellesliste: Raudt, Sosialistisk Venstre, og Sosialdemokratar i Meland) | 3 |
| Total number of members: | 27 |

Meland kommunestyre 1999–2003
| Party name (in Nynorsk) | Number of representatives |
|---|---|
| Labour Party (Arbeidarpartiet) | 7 |
| Progress Party (Framstegspartiet) | 2 |
| Conservative Party (Høgre) | 6 |
| Christian Democratic Party (Kristeleg Folkeparti) | 5 |
| Red Electoral Alliance (Raud Valallianse) | 1 |
| Centre Party (Senterpartiet) | 3 |
| Liberal Party (Venstre) | 3 |
| Total number of members: | 27 |

Meland kommunestyre 1995–1999
| Party name (in Nynorsk) | Number of representatives |
|---|---|
| Labour Party (Arbeidarpartiet) | 8 |
| Progress Party (Framstegspartiet) | 1 |
| Conservative Party (Høgre) | 4 |
| Christian Democratic Party (Kristeleg Folkeparti) | 5 |
| Centre Party (Senterpartiet) | 5 |
| Socialist Left Party (Sosialistisk Venstreparti) | 1 |
| Liberal Party (Venstre) | 3 |
| Total number of members: | 27 |

Meland kommunestyre 1991–1995
| Party name (in Nynorsk) | Number of representatives |
|---|---|
| Labour Party (Arbeidarpartiet) | 8 |
| Progress Party (Framstegspartiet) | 1 |
| Conservative Party (Høgre) | 4 |
| Christian Democratic Party (Kristeleg Folkeparti) | 6 |
| Centre Party (Senterpartiet) | 5 |
| Liberal Party (Venstre) | 3 |
| Total number of members: | 27 |

Meland kommunestyre 1987–1991
| Party name (in Nynorsk) | Number of representatives |
|---|---|
| Labour Party (Arbeidarpartiet) | 8 |
| Progress Party (Framstegspartiet) | 2 |
| Conservative Party (Høgre) | 5 |
| Christian Democratic Party (Kristeleg Folkeparti) | 5 |
| Centre Party (Senterpartiet) | 5 |
| Liberal Party (Venstre) | 2 |
| Total number of members: | 27 |

Meland kommunestyre 1983–1987
| Party name (in Nynorsk) | Number of representatives |
|---|---|
| Labour Party (Arbeidarpartiet) | 7 |
| Progress Party (Framstegspartiet) | 1 |
| Conservative Party (Høgre) | 6 |
| Christian Democratic Party (Kristeleg Folkeparti) | 5 |
| Centre Party (Senterpartiet) | 6 |
| Socialist Left Party (Sosialistisk Venstreparti) | 1 |
| Liberal Party (Venstre) | 1 |
| Total number of members: | 27 |

Meland kommunestyre 1979–1983
| Party name (in Nynorsk) | Number of representatives |
|---|---|
| Labour Party (Arbeidarpartiet) | 5 |
| Conservative Party (Høgre) | 6 |
| Christian Democratic Party (Kristeleg Folkeparti) | 5 |
| New People's Party (Nye Folkepartiet) | 2 |
| Centre Party (Senterpartiet) | 7 |
| Socialist Left Party (Sosialistisk Venstreparti) | 1 |
| Liberal Party (Venstre) | 1 |
| Total number of members: | 27 |

Meland kommunestyre 1975–1979
| Party name (in Nynorsk) | Number of representatives |
|---|---|
| Labour Party (Arbeidarpartiet) | 4 |
| Conservative Party (Høgre) | 2 |
| Christian Democratic Party (Kristeleg Folkeparti) | 5 |
| New People's Party (Nye Folkepartiet) | 2 |
| Centre Party (Senterpartiet) | 7 |
| Liberal Party (Venstre) | 1 |
| Total number of members: | 21 |

Meland kommunestyre 1971–1975
| Party name (in Nynorsk) | Number of representatives |
|---|---|
| Labour Party (Arbeidarpartiet) | 4 |
| Conservative Party (Høgre) | 2 |
| Christian Democratic Party (Kristeleg Folkeparti) | 5 |
| Centre Party (Senterpartiet) | 5 |
| Liberal Party (Venstre) | 3 |
| Local List(s) (Lokale lister) | 2 |
| Total number of members: | 21 |

Meland kommunestyre 1967–1971
| Party name (in Nynorsk) | Number of representatives |
|---|---|
| Labour Party (Arbeidarpartiet) | 4 |
| Conservative Party (Høgre) | 1 |
| Christian Democratic Party (Kristeleg Folkeparti) | 6 |
| Centre Party (Senterpartiet) | 7 |
| Liberal Party (Venstre) | 3 |
| Total number of members: | 21 |

Meland kommunestyre 1963–1967
| Party name (in Nynorsk) | Number of representatives |
|---|---|
| Labour Party (Arbeidarpartiet) | 3 |
| Christian Democratic Party (Kristeleg Folkeparti) | 5 |
| Local List(s) (Lokale lister) | 13 |
| Total number of members: | 21 |

Meland heradsstyre 1959–1963
| Party name (in Nynorsk) | Number of representatives |
|---|---|
| Local List(s) (Lokale lister) | 17 |
| Total number of members: | 17 |

Meland heradsstyre 1955–1959
| Party name (in Nynorsk) | Number of representatives |
|---|---|
| Local List(s) (Lokale lister) | 17 |
| Total number of members: | 17 |

Meland heradsstyre 1951–1955
| Party name (in Nynorsk) | Number of representatives |
|---|---|
| Local List(s) (Lokale lister) | 16 |
| Total number of members: | 16 |

Meland heradsstyre 1947–1951
| Party name (in Nynorsk) | Number of representatives |
|---|---|
| Labour Party (Arbeidarpartiet) | 1 |
| Local List(s) (Lokale lister) | 15 |
| Total number of members: | 16 |

Meland heradsstyre 1945–1947
| Party name (in Nynorsk) | Number of representatives |
|---|---|
| Labour Party (Arbeidarpartiet) | 2 |
| Local List(s) (Lokale lister) | 14 |
| Total number of members: | 16 |

Mæland heradsstyre 1937–1941*
| Party name (in Nynorsk) | Number of representatives |
|---|---|
| Labour Party (Arbeidarpartiet) | 2 |
| Local List(s) (Lokale lister) | 14 |
| Total number of members: | 16 |
Note: Due to the German occupation of Norway during World War II, no elections were held for new municipal councils until after the war ended in 1945.

=== Mayors ===
The mayor (Nynorsk: ordførar) of Meland Municipality was the political leader of the municipality and the chairperson of the municipal council. The following people held this position:

- 1923–1931: Andreas Hagen (LL)
- 1932–1938: Lars G. Hopland (LL)
- 1938–1945: Nils Hvidsten (LL)
- 1946–1968: Olav Åmdal (LL)
- 1968–1979: Johannes H. Fosse (KrF)
- 1980–1991: Harry Wiig Andersen (Sp)
- 1992–1999: Arne I. Sakstad (Ap)
- 1999–2007: Solbjørg Å. Sandvik (H)
- 2007–2015: Nils Marton Aadland (H)
- 2015–2019: Øyvind Helland Oddekalv (Ap)

== See also ==
- List of former municipalities of Norway
