= Krossneset =

Village in Alver Municipality, Norway

- Village
- Interactive map of Krossneset
- Coordinates: 60.53078°N 5.2568°E
- Country: Norway
- Region: Western Norway
- County: Vestland
- District: Nordhordland
- Municipality: Alver Municipality

Area
  - Total: 0.51 km^{2} (0.20 sq mi)
- Elevation: 16 m (52 ft)

Population (2025)
  - Total: 480
  - Density: 941/km^{2} (2,440/sq mi)
- Time zone: UTC+01:00 (CET)
  - Summer (DST): UTC+02:00 (CEST)
- Post Code: 5918 Frekhaug

Krossneset is a village in Alver Municipality in Vestland county, Norway. The village sits on the island of Flatøy, about half-way between the villages of Frekhaug (to the west) and Knarvik (to the east).

The 0.51-square-kilometre (130-acre) village has a population (2025) of 480 and a population density of 941 inhabitants per square kilometre (2,440/sq mi).

The village sits at a major transportation cross-roads. The small island of Flatøy is the hub of a three-way bridge network that connects the entire Nordhordland district to the city of Bergen. The Krossnessundet Bridge connects to the island of Holsnøy to the west, the Hagelsund Bridge connects to the Lindås peninsula to the east, and the Nordhordland Bridge to Bergen to the south. The Hagelsund and Nordhordland bridges carry the European route E39 highway.
