= Kvernafjord =

Fjord in Vestland, Norway

- Location within Vestland Location within Norway
- Location: Vestland county, Norway
- Coordinates: 60°33′14″N 5°14′45″E
- Basin countries: Norway
- Max. length: 3.5 kilometres (2.2 mi)
- Max. width: 0.8 kilometres (0.50 mi)
- Max. depth: 160 metres (520 ft)
- Surface elevation: 0 m (0 ft)

Kvernafjord is a small fjord next to the island of Flatøy and just west of the village of Knarvik in Alver Municipality in Vestland county, Norway. The fjord lies between the Radfjord, which is part of the same fjord system, and the sound Hagelsund, which creates a link to the southeast, where Salhusfjord meets Osterfjord. Kvernafjord extends 3.5 kilometers (2.2 mi) northwest to a line between Radtangen on the island of Radøy to the northeast and Skarpeneset on the island of Holsnøy to the southwest. The strait Alverstraum lies to the east, creating a connection to the village of Alversund.

At the south end of the fjord, European route E39 crosses the Hagelsund over the 623-meter (2,044 ft) Hagelsund Bridge.

== See also ==
- List of Norwegian fjords
