= Flatøy Rock =

Music festival

Flatøy Rock is a music festival held on the island of Flatøy, in western Norway. It was started in a garden by Vegard Flatøy and his friends in the summer of 2008, while Flatøy's parents were on vacation in Lanzarote. In the beginning, the stages were self-roofed by a garden tent.

In 2011, the festival had grown too big for the garden, so it moved to the islands closed elementary schools yard, where it could hold a bigger crowd. It expanded into a two-day festival in 2012.

Flatøy Rock is based on the volunteer work of the inhabitants of Flatøy, although many of its guests come from the nearby Lindås Municipality, Meland Municipality, and Bergen Municipality. Its philosophy has been to promote up-and-coming artists and acts which normally do not get big stage attention. Flatøy Rock also has a sub-festival for people under 18 years of age.

In 2013 Flatøy Rock introduced the 18th century rebel and warlord Jochum de Lange as the mascot and theme for the festival. This was done in an effort to raise awareness to the history and heritage of the people in Nordhordland. The line up featured acts like Krakow, The Scumbugs and Marky Ramones Blitzkrieg.
