= Jochum de Lange =

Jochum de Lange was the leader of Strilekrigen, an 18th-century farmer's rebellion, in Bergen, Norway. He led several thousand men to protest against the high taxes which were imposed on the poor farmers and fishermen of Norway.

== Biography ==
Jochum de Lange was a former sailor who settled down as a farmer on the island of Flatøy, Norway. He was said to be a charismatic man, who was married three times, and who easily gained other peoples trust. He was a visionary and a man of experience, but adventurous with a longing to return to the sea. Jochum de Lange would die in a Bergen prison.

== Strilekrigen ==
In autumn 1762, the national government in Copenhagen established an extra per capita tax for every person over twelve years, which was later reduced to a charge per household. These extra taxes were intended to help pay loans from foreign governments and to support the price of the Danish-Norwegian currency at the stock market in Hamburg.

Strilekrigen took place in Bergen on 18 April 1765, when about 2,000 common people from Nordhordland poured into Bergen to protest against the harsh action of the extra tax. The extra tax had hit the poor farmers and fishermen in rural areas around Bergen particularly hard. The protests, which became violent, were particularly directed at Ulrik Fredrik de Cicignon (1698–1772), the local sheriff (stiftamtmann) .

Rebellions of this magnitude was unprecedented in the 18th century, and officials in Copenhagen were appalled. The authorities send an inquiry north consisting of top officials on a warship. The leaders of the rebellion were indicted by the general court and were convicted of disturbance of public order. The result was that a few farmers ended in prison for life after being pardoned from the death sentence. The extra tax was later abolished in Norway in 1772 but continued in force in Denmark. Ulrik Fredrik de Cicignon sought and received dismissal in May 1766. He moved to Sønderborg in the Duchy of Schleswig.

== Legacy ==
Olav Flatøy, a businessman and writer from Flatøy, wrote a novel concerning life on Flatøy in the mid-18th century. It was called Anne Cathrine, and told the story of Jocum de Lange, his third wife and her struggles after his death. This novel was printed as a serial in Bergens Tidende in 1961.

In 2013 the music festival Flatøy Rock introduced Jochum de Lange as the mascot and theme for the festival. This was done in an effort to raise awareness to the history and heritage of the people in Nordhordland.
