= Flatøy =

Island in Vestland, Norway

- Interactive map of Flatøy

Geography
- Location: Vestland, Norway
- Coordinates: 60.5346°N 5.2595°E
- Area: 2.2 km^{2} (0.85 sq mi)
- Length: 2.8 km (1.74 mi)
- Width: 1.6 km (0.99 mi)
- Highest elevation: 171 m (561 ft)
- Highest point: Håøytoppen

Administration
- Norway
- County: Vestland
- Municipality: Alver Municipality

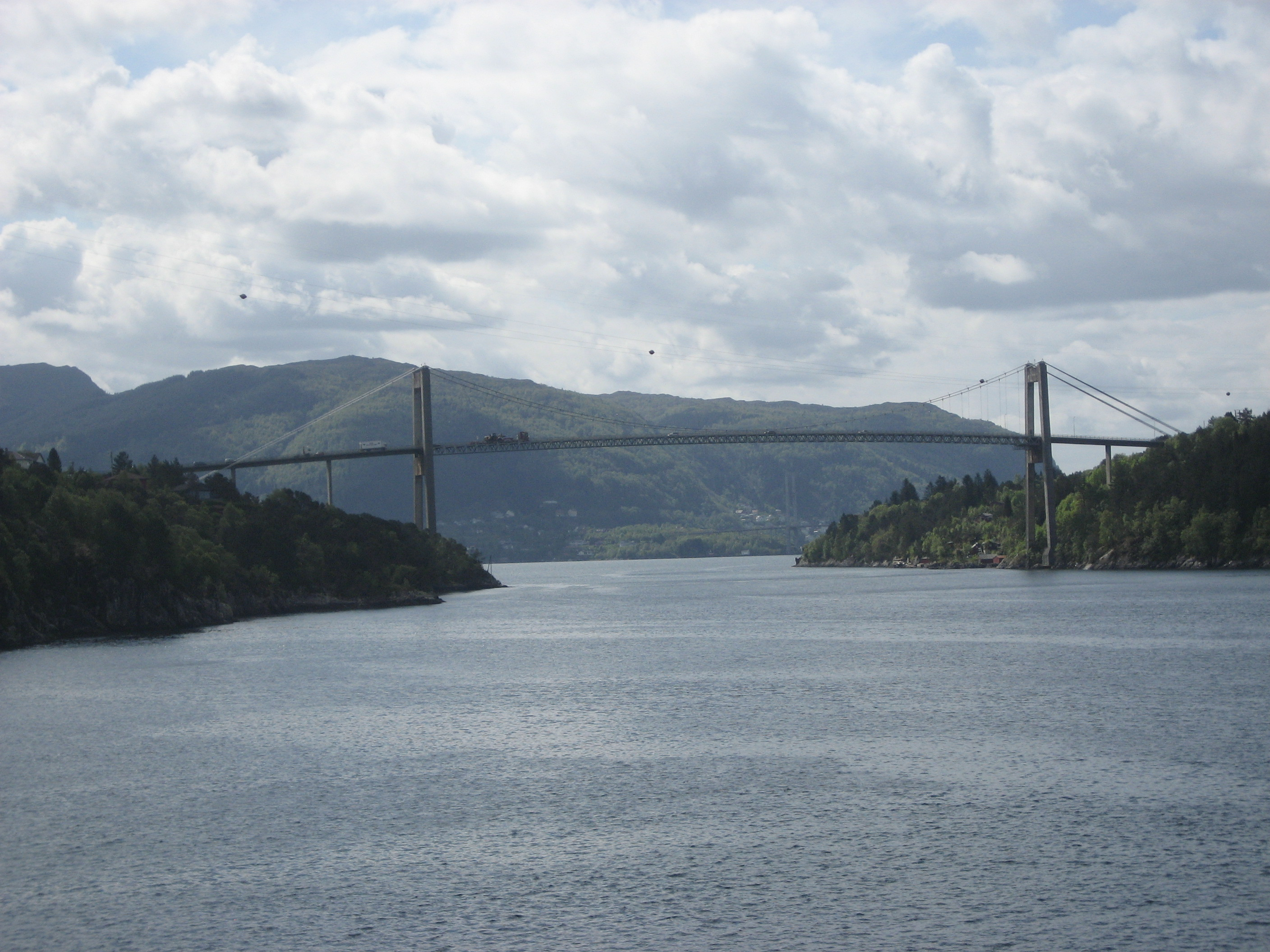
Hagelsundbrua

Flatøy is an island in Alver Municipality in Vestland county, Norway. The 2.2-square-kilometre (0.85 sq mi) island lies in the district of Nordhordland, just north of the city of Bergen. The main village on the island is Krossneset on the southern part of the island. The northern part of the island, on the southwest shore of Kvernafjord, is very sparsely inhabited. Historically, the island was one of the two main islands of the old Meland Municipality.

The island is strategically located at a major transportation crossroads. It lies between the Salhus neighborhood of Bergen Municipality (to the south), the island of Holsnøy (to the west), and the village of Knarvik to the east. The island is connected to these larger communities by three bridges: Nordhordland Bridge connects it to Salhus, the Krossnessundet Bridge connects it to Holsnøy, and the Hagelsund Bridge connects it to Knarvik. Since the only road connection from Bergen to Nordhordland is via the Nordhordland Bridge, Flatøy serves as the entry point to the whole Norhordland district.

The island is the home to approximately 500 inhabitants, mostly in Krossneset, and was served by a local elementary school, Flatøy Skule until it closed in 2010. The students now go to school in the village of Frekhaug on the neighboring island of Holsnøy. Flatøy is also home to the music festival Flatøy Rock.
