= Salhusfjorden =

Fjord in Vestland, Norway

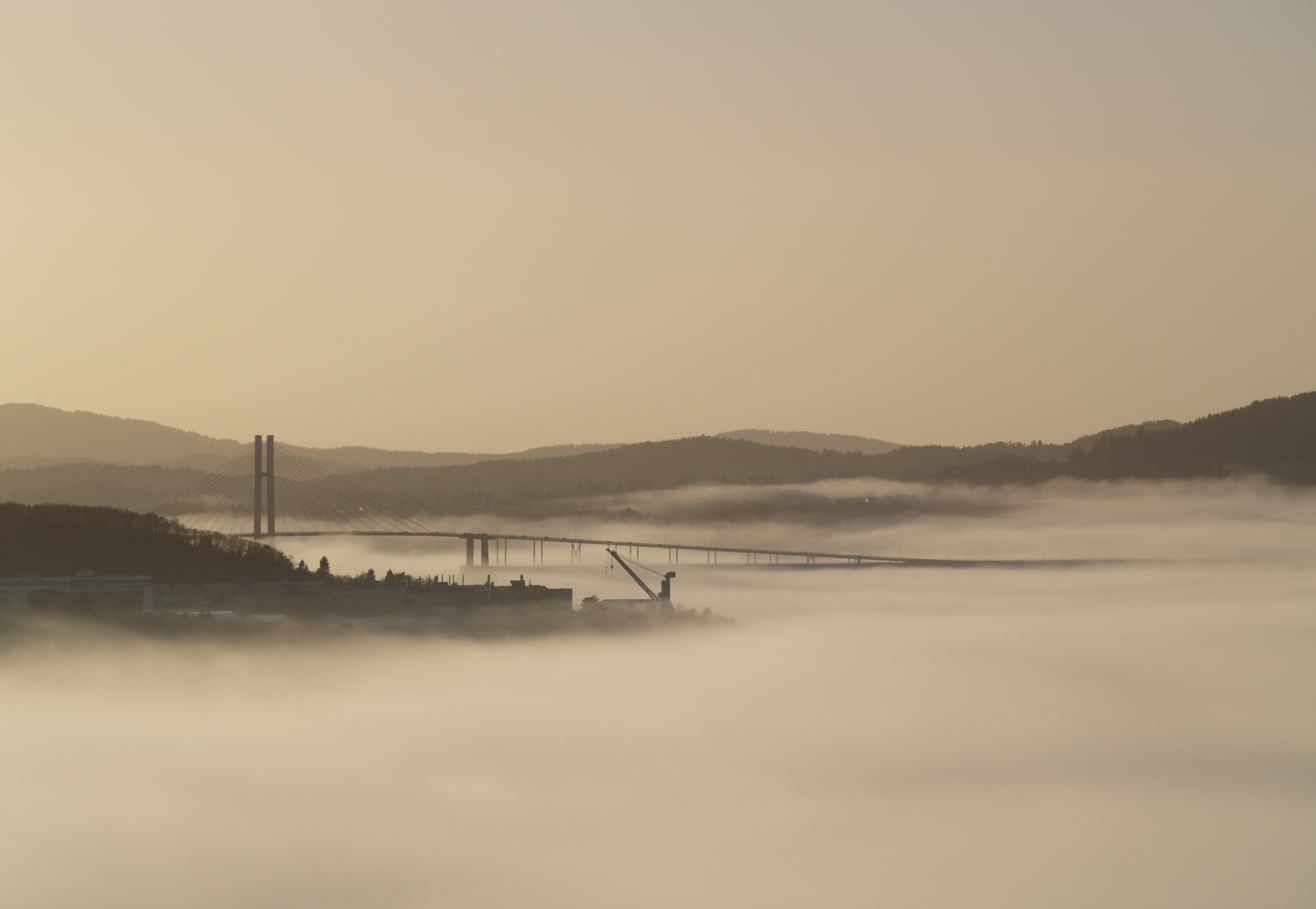
- View of the Nordhordland Bridge crossing the Salhusfjorden
- Interactive map of Salhusfjorden
- Location: Vestland county, Norway
- Coordinates: 60.510°N 5.255°E
- Type: Fjord
- Primary inflows: Osterfjorden, Sørfjorden
- Primary outflows: Byfjorden
- Basin countries: Norway
- Max. length: 4 km (2.5 mi)
- Max. depth: 500 m (1,600 ft)

Salhusfjorden is a 4-kilometer (2.5 mi) long fjord and sound between Bergen Municipality and Alver Municipality in Vestland county, Norway. To the west, it starts between the villages of Salhus and Frekhaug, where the Byfjorden meets the Herdlefjorden. To the east, the fjord ends between the village of Knarvik and the Hordvikneset peninsula, where the Osterfjorden runs northeast, the Sørfjorden runs southeast, and the Radfjorden runs north. The fjord is up to 500 meters (1,600 ft) deep. It acts as one of the borders between the districts of Midhordland to the south and Nordhordland to the north. The islands of Holsnøy and Flatøy lie along the northern side of the fjord.

== History ==
The fjord takes its name from the village area of Salhus, which during the Viking Age in the early 12th century there was an inn (known at the time as a sáluhus), which would give name to the place. It acted as a transport hub for Nordhordland, and was a small market town. It was one of the first industrialized places when a hosiery manufacturer was established here in 1859.

== Crossings ==
Salhusfjorden is crossed by the Nordhordland Bridge, a 1,614-meter (5,295 ft) combined pontoon and cable stayed bridge. Because of the depth, the bridge lacks lateral anchorage. The bridge, which carries European Route E39, was opened on 22 September 1994. It is the second-longest bridge in Norway.

Previously, there were two ferry crossings of the Salhusfjorden. Starting on 7 July 1936, a ferry service ran between the villages of Isdalstø and Steinestø. In 1956, the ferry on the Nordhordland side moved to Knarvik, and it was the most trafficked ferry service in the country before the bridge opened in 1994. At first operated by Fergetrafikk, from 1967 it was run by Bergen Nordhordland Rutelag. Until 1984, there was also a ferry crossing between Salhus and Frekhaug, operated by the same company.

== See also ==
- List of Norwegian fjords
