= Strilekrigen =

1765 rebellion in Norway

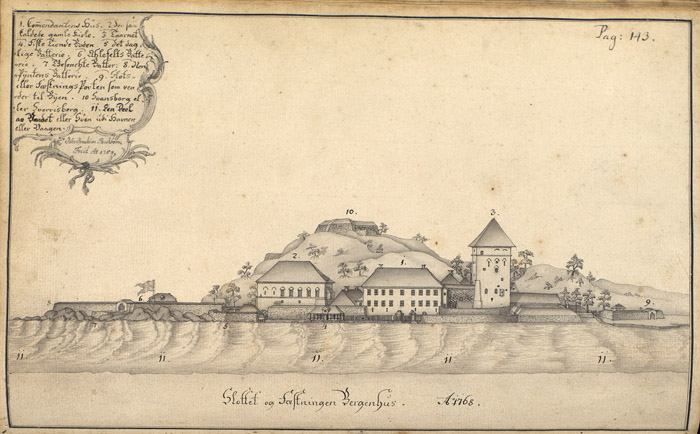
- Bergenhus festning, Håkonshallen and Rosenkrantztårnet in Bergen, by Johan Joachim Reichborn
| Date | 1 March – 18 April 1765 |
| Location | Bergen, Denmark-Norway |
| Result | Dano-Norwegian victory |

Belligerents
| Norwegian farmers | (Denmark–Norway) Denmark-Norway |

Commanders and leaders
| Jochum de Lange | (Denmark–Norway) Frederik V (Denmark–Norway) Ulrik Fredrik |

Strilekrigen was a farmer's rebellion that took place in Bergen in Norway (at the time in a union with Denmark) on 18 April 1765, when about 2,000 common people from Nordhordland poured into Bergen to protest against the harsh action of the extra tax. The extra tax had hit the poor farmers and fishermen in rural areas around Bergen particularly hard. The protests, which became violent, were particularly directed at Ulrik Fredrik de Cicignon, the local sheriff (stiftamtmann).

In autumn 1762, the national government in Copenhagen established an extra per capita tax for every person over twelve years, which was later reduced to a charge per household. These extra taxes were intended to help pay loans from foreign governments and to support the price of the Danish-Norwegian currency at the stock market in Hamburg.

Rebellions of this magnitude was unprecedented in the 18th century, and officials in Copenhagen were appalled. The authorities send an inquiry north consisting of top officials on a warship. The leaders of the rebellion were indicted by the general court and were convicted of disturbance of public order. The result was that a few farmers ended in prison for life after being pardoned from the death sentence. The extra tax was later abolished in Norway in 1772 but continued in force in Denmark. After the rebellion Cicignon sought and received dismissal as stiftamtmann in May 1766. He moved to Sønderborg in the Duchy of Schleswig, where he died in 1772.

== See also ==
- Jochum de Lange
