= Io, Norway =

Village in Alver Municipality, Norway

Io
- Village
- Interactive map of Io
- Coordinates: 60.56083°N 5.02119°E
- Country: Norway
- Region: Western Norway
- County: Vestland
- District: Nordhordland
- Municipality: Alver Municipality
- Elevation: 17 m (56 ft)
- Time zone: UTC+01:00 (CET)
  - Summer (DST): UTC+02:00 (CEST)
- Post Code: 5917 Rossland

Io is a village in Alver Municipality in Vestland county, Norway. The village sits on the shore of the Herdlefjorden along the northern coast of the island of Holsnøy, about 3 kilometres (1.9 mi) southwest of the village of Rossland.

== See also ==
- List of short place names
