= Nyborg Tunnel =

Proposed tunnel in Norway

The Nyborg Tunnel is a proposed 8-kilometre (5.0 mi) long road tunnel between Åsane and Klauvaneset in Bergen Municipality in Vestland county, Norway. If built, it would extend the four-lane motorway section of European route E39 (E39) from Åsane northwards to the Nordhordland Bridge. The tunnel is presumed financed with a five-year toll collection at the bridge while the tunnel is being built, and then with a toll on the tunnel for 15 years. It is estimated to cost 1,900 million kr. Construction has not started on this project. The tunnel would branch off the current E39 highway at Åsane, just west of the IKEA store, and it would head northwards. It would exit the tunnel just south of the Nordhordland Bridge.
