= Knarvik Upper Secondary School =

School in Vestland, Norway

Coordinates: 60°33′01″N 5°16′57″E

Knarvik Upper Secondary School (Knarvik vidaregåande skule) is a high school located on Knarvik in Alver Municipality in Vestland county, Norway. The school is located about 30 kilometres (19 mi) north of the city of Bergen. The school is one of the largest in Hordaland, with over 950 pupils and about 150 employees. The school has a close connection to local industry; students can attend a program called TAF that eventually leads to both craftmanship certification and a high school degree in four years.
