= Nordhordland Bridge =

Bridge in Vestland county, Norway

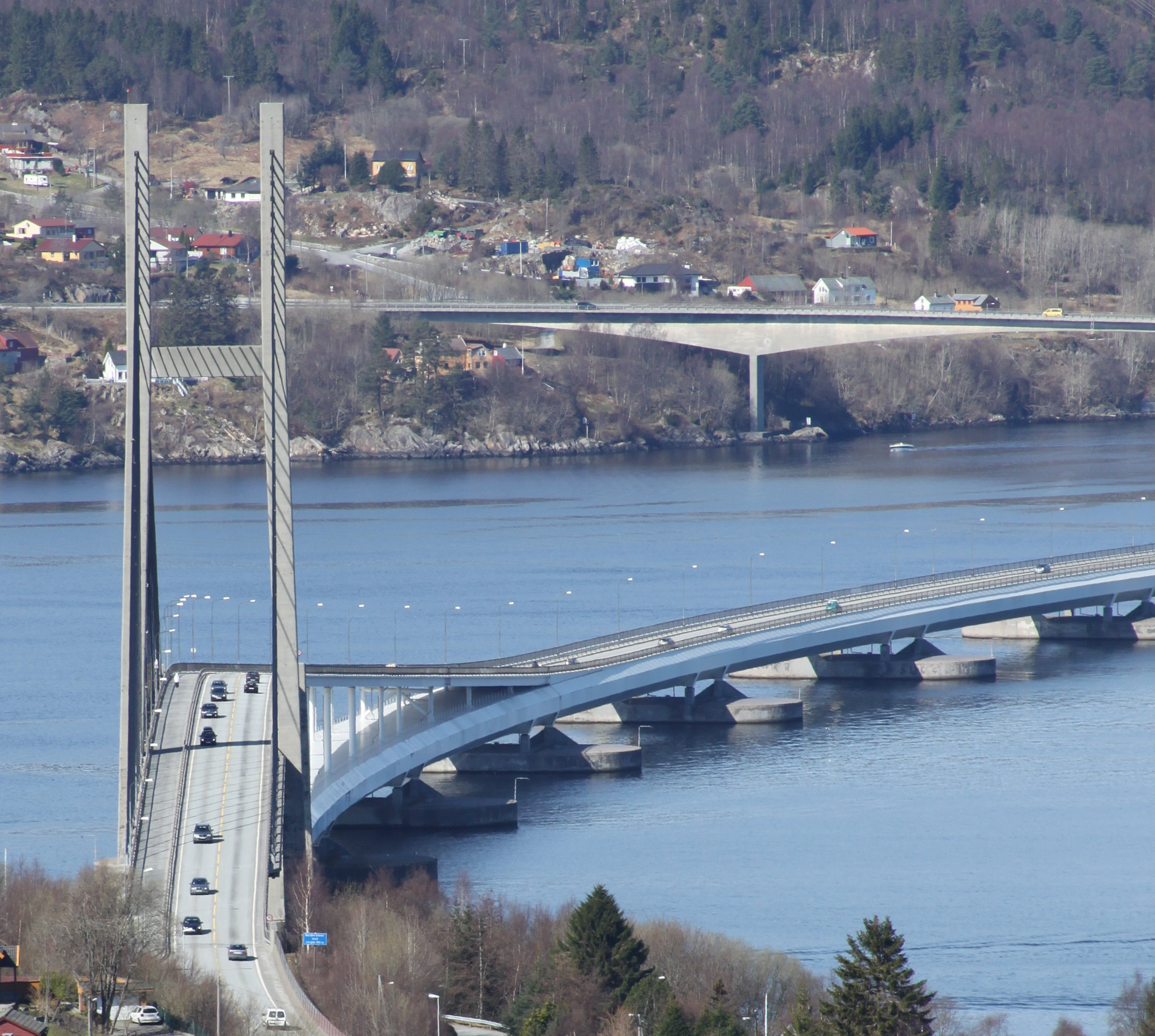
- Coordinates: 60°31′26″N 05°15′52″E
- Carries: Two lanes of E39; One pedestrian/bicycle path
- Crosses: Salhusfjorden
- Locale: Bergen and Alver, Norway
- Official name: Nordhordlandsbrua
- Maintained by: Norwegian Public Roads Administration

Characteristics
- Material: Concrete
- Total length: 1,614 m (5,295 ft)
- Height: 99 m (325 ft)
- Longest span: 172 m (564 ft)
- Clearance below: 32 m (105 ft)

History
- Designer: Aas-Jakobsen
- Opened: 22 September 1994

Statistics
- Daily traffic: 17,487 (2016)
- Toll: Yes, since 2019. Also 1994–2005.

Location
- Interactive map of Nordhordland Bridge

The Nordhordland Bridge (Norwegian: Nordhordlandsbrua) is a combined cable-stayed and pontoon bridge which crosses Salhusfjorden between Klauvaneset (in Bergen Municipality) and the island of Flatøy (in Alver Municipality) in Vestland county, Norway. It is 1,614 meters (5,295 ft) long, of which the pontoon section is 1,246 meters (4,088 ft) long. The cable-stayed section consists of a single 99-meter (325 ft) tall H-pylon which has a length of 368 meters (1,207 ft) and a main span of 172 meters (564 ft). This allows for a clearance of 32 meters (105 ft).

The floating section is a steel box girder bridge with ten pontoons, which because of the fjord's depth are not laterally anchored. The roadway sits on an orthotropic deck. The pontoons and the cable-stayed bridge are built in concrete, with the main span being supported with 48 cables. The fjord end of the main span is supported by a 30-meter (98 ft) deep foundation, where the two bridges meet. From there and for 414 meters (1,358 ft), the roadwall has a 5.7 percent gradient on a viaduct anchored to the pontoon bridge.

The bridge carries two lanes of European Route E39, also called the Coastal Highway, and one pedestrian and bicycle path, and connects the district of Nordhordland to Bergen. Plans for a bridge had existed since the 1960s, and after the decision to construct the bridge was passed by the Parliament of Norway in 1989, construction started in 1991. Total costs, including auxiliary roads, was NOK 910 million. Part of the contract payment was subject to a court case which the contractors lost. The bridge opened on 22 September 1994, and remained a toll road until 31 December 2005. In 2014, it had an average daily traffic of 16,580 vehicles. Tolls were reinstated on the bridge in 2019 to finance other road projects in the area. The bridge is the second-longest in Norway, and the second pontoon bridge in Norway.

== Specifications ==
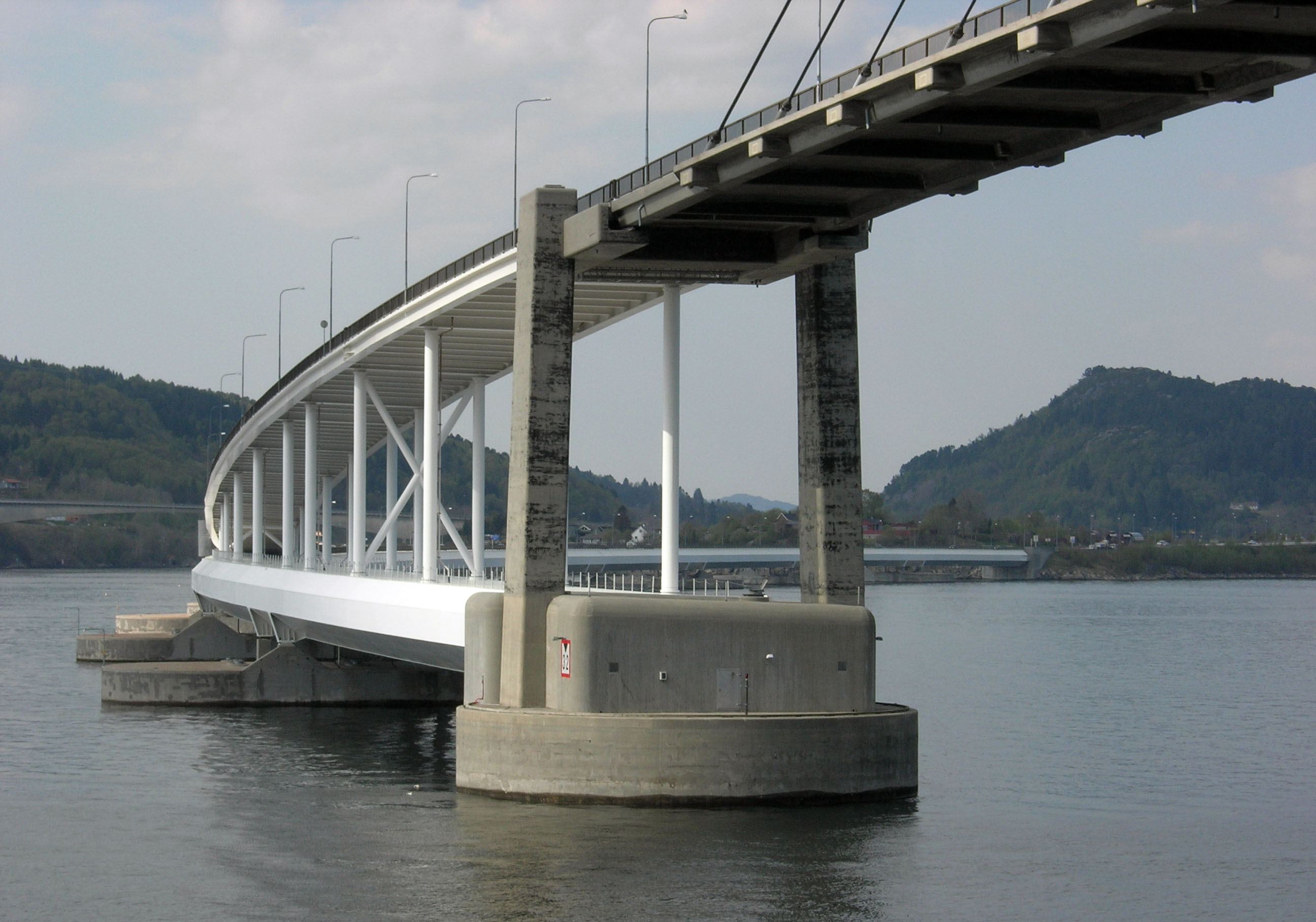
The point where the pontoon and cable-stayed bridges are connected

The bridge consists of three sections, a cable-stayed bridge, a pontoon bridge and a viaduct which connects the two. The cable-stayed bridge consists of a 99.3-meter (326 ft) tall H-pylon with a foundation at Klauvaneset on the mainland of Bergen. It supports a 172-meter (564 ft) main span, with the other end being fixed in a foundation 30-meter (98 ft) below mean sea level, which is anchored in the ridge Klauvaskallen. The whole cable-stayed bridge is 369 meters (1,211 ft) long, with a 190-meter (620 ft) long viaduct, supported by six pairs of pillars. The cable-stayed bridge allows for a sailing channel which is 32 meters (105 ft) tall and 50 meters (160 ft) wide. The main span is built in lightweight LC55 concrete, while the viaduct and pylon is built with conventional C45 concrete. Inside the pylons is a 1.6-by-2.0-meter (5 ft 3 in by 6 ft 7 in) hollow area.

The bridge has 48 cables, 12 on each side of the pylon on each side of the roadway. The distance between the cables is 12.00 meters (39.37 ft) on the main span, and 9.33 meters (30.6 ft) on the viaduct. Combined, the cables are 4,432 meters (14,541 ft) long; each cable consists of 67 to 230 twined cables, each with a 7-millimeter (0.28 in) diameter. The cables have a weight of between 1.5 and 14.5 tonnes (1.5 and 14.3 long tons; 1.7 and 16.0 short tons) each, and they have a capacity of between 1,960 and 7,910 kilonewtons (440,000 and 1,780,000 lb_{f}). They can be tightened at the connection with the roadwall.

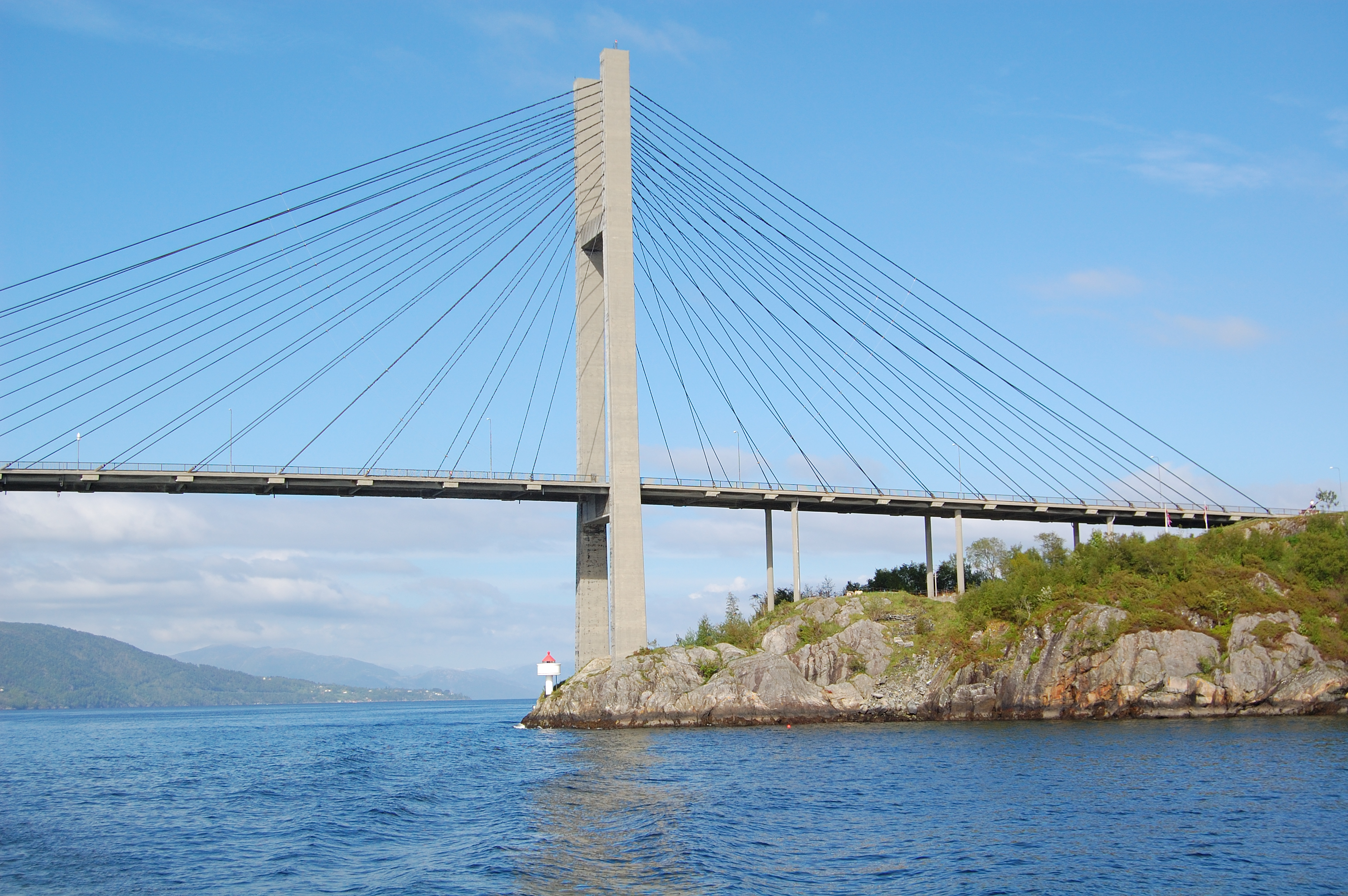
The cable-stayed section

The floating section consists of a steel box girder placed on top of ten floating pontoons. The pontoon section is anchored only at both ends, on the underwater foundation at Kauvaskallen and on Flatøy. It is fastened using flexible plate connections fastened by bolts and cables under tension. These are flexible around the horizontal axis at right angles towards the axis of the bridge, allowing for deformation caused by the tide. The fastening on Flatøy consists of a massive concrete block 22 by 20 meters (72 by 66 ft) long and 14.5 meters (48 ft) tall which was poured into a blast-out foundation pit in bedrock. Vertical pretension rock anchors have also been installed, with 12 at Klauvaskallen and 14 at Flatøy, giving 42 and 44 meganewtons (9,400,000 and 9,900,000 lb_{f}) of support, although they were only built to increase the safety factor.

There are ten lightweight concrete pontoons, with 113.25-meter (371.6 ft) spans between them. The pontoons are between 7.0 and 8.6 meters (23.0 and 28.2 ft) in height. The draught varies between 4.3 to 5.6 meters (14 to 18 ft). Each pontoon consists of nine watertight cells which are partially filled with ballast for trim. The cells are dimensioned so two adjacent cells can fill with water without endangering the bridge.

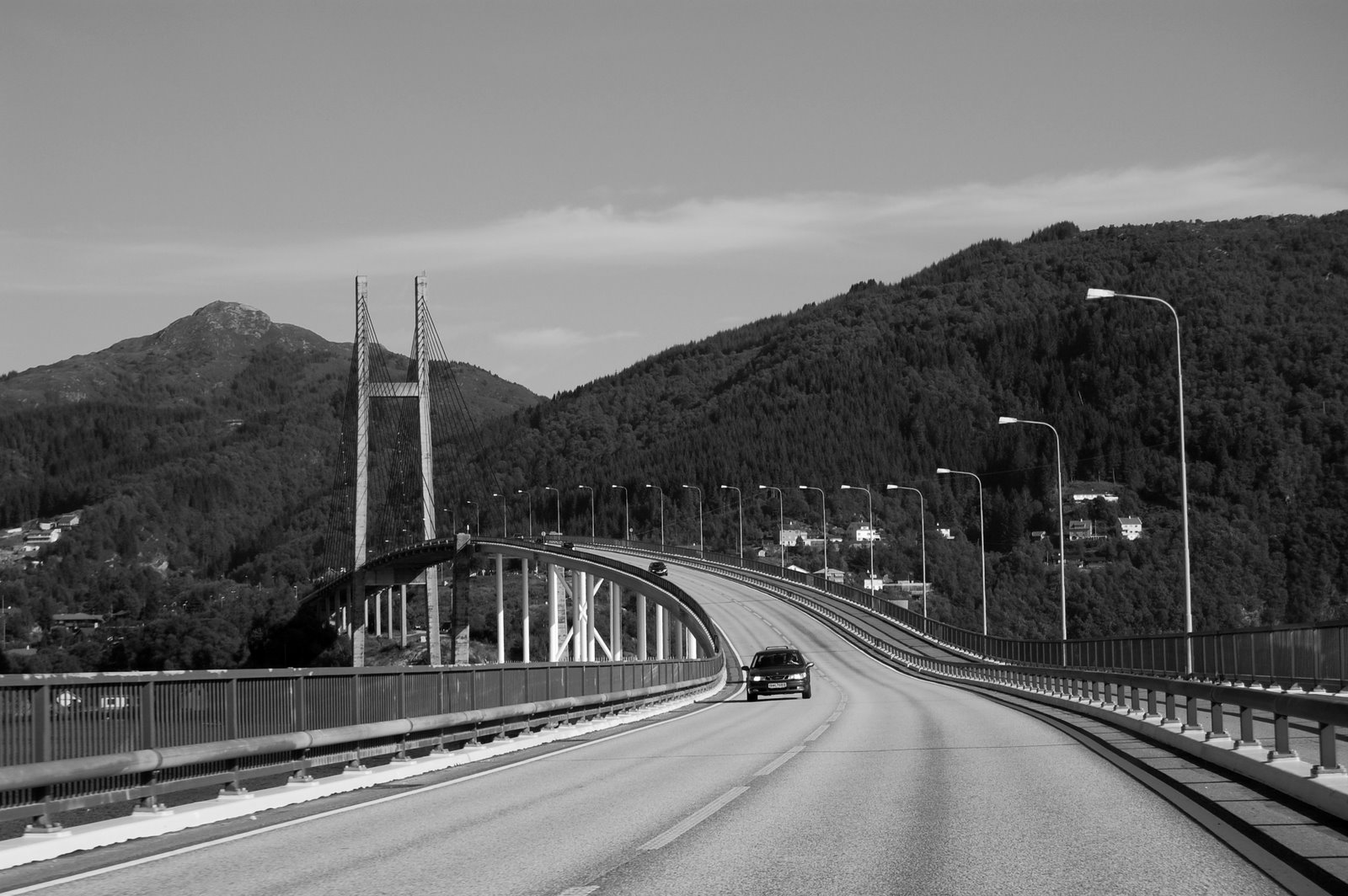
The deck

The roadway lies on top of an orthotropic deck on a steel box girder, which is 15.9 meters (52 ft) wide, 5.50 meters (18.0 ft) tall and 1,246 meters (4,088 ft) long. The steel box girder weighs 14,150 tonnes (13,930 long tons; 15,600 short tons), of which 3,000 tonnes (3,000 long tons; 3,300 short tons) is high-strength low-alloy steel. The girder has an octagonal shape and is made with 14-to-20-millimeter (0.55 to 0.79 in) thick steel plates. They are longitudinally stiffened by trapezoidal stiffeners supported by cross frames at most every 4.5 meters (15 ft). Two full bulkheads have been used for every pontoon pilaster, made from welded steel plates 8 to 50 millimeters (0.31 to 1.97 in) thick. External brackets built into the bulkheads transfer the support forces to the pontoons. The girder was built in sections of 21, 36, and 42 meters (69, 118, and 138 ft), which were subsequently welded together into 11 modules with a skew angle of 1.2 to 1.3 degrees. The girder has a constant cross-section throughout the length, except at the anchoring points to the pontoons. The section from the land anchoring to the first pontoon is subject to the most stress, and is made with steel with a higher yield point. The inside of the girder has two dehumidifiers which ensure that it does not rust. The clearance under the girder is 5.5 meters (18 ft).

The two bridges are connected with a 414.5-meter (1,360 ft) long steel viaduct, which runs on top of the floating bridge, bringing the road from 11.0 to 34.4 meters (36.1 to 112.9 ft) above mean sea level. The viaduct weighs 1,600 tonnes (1,600 long tons; 1,800 short tons) and has a gradient of 5.7 degrees. It consists of spans between 18 and 33 meters (59 and 108 ft), with the roadway also built as an orthotropic deck with 12-millimeter (0.47 in) thick plates. Overall, the construction of the bridge used 24,000 tonnes (24,000 long tons; 26,000 short tons) of concrete, of which 10,000 tonnes (9,800 long tons; 11,000 short tons) in the pontoons. The bridge was coated with 40,000 litres (8,800 imp gal; 11,000 US gal) of paint.

The bridge is monitored by 132 sensors, including sensors on hatches to the pontoons, on doors to the steel box girder, for corrosion, strain gauges on the girder and on flexible elements, and weather information. On the cable-stayed section, the bridge is marked with navigation lights, as well as the center of the sailing area having a racon. The bridge is the second-longest bridge in Norway, behind the Drammen Bridge.

== History ==
=== Planning ===
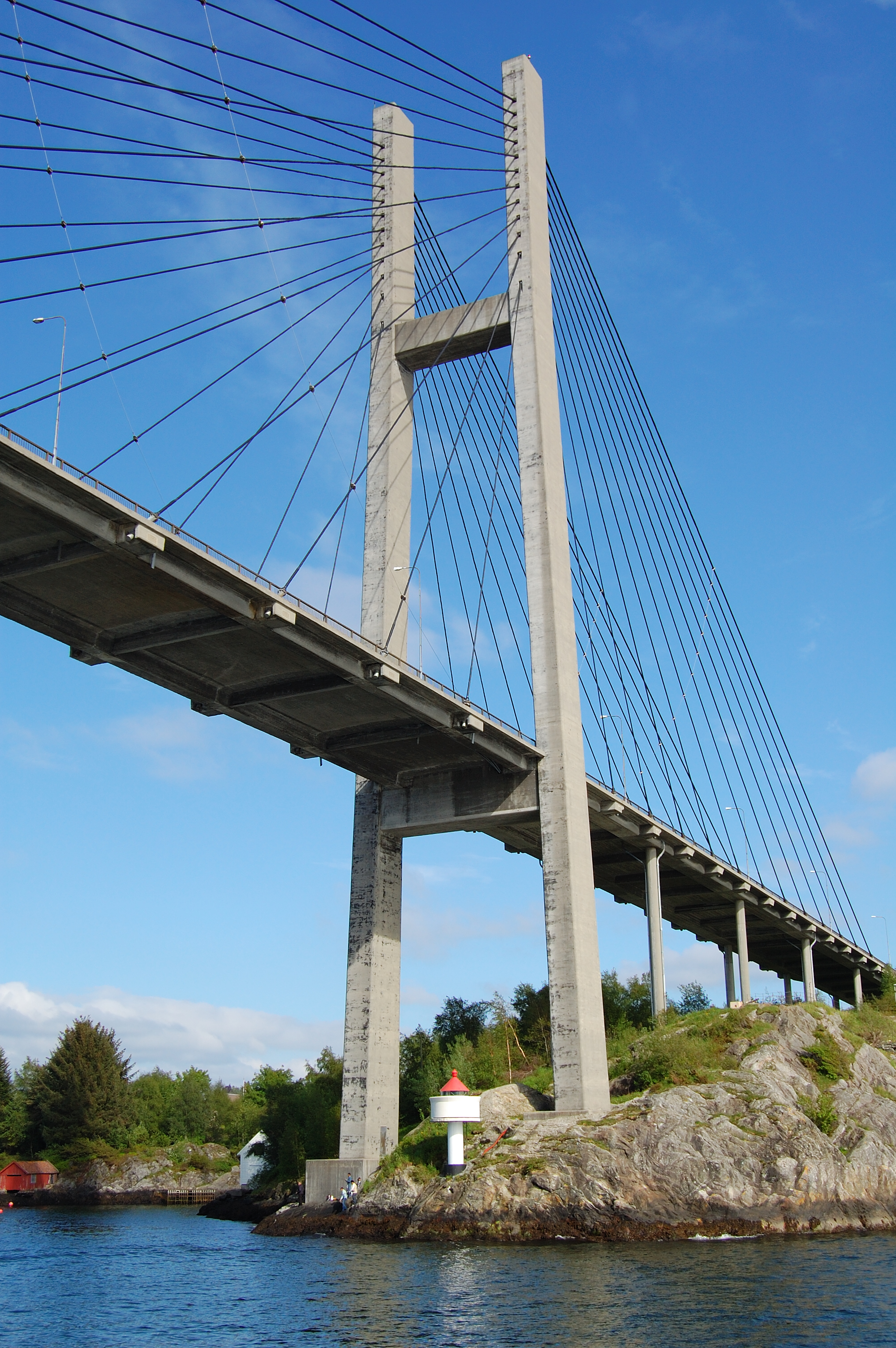
The single pylon

Ship services in Nordhordland started in 1866, and in 1923 the first car was purchased. A car ferry service between Isdalstø in Lindås and Steinestø in Åsane on the mainland was established on 7 July 1936. A plan was launched whereby all traffic from Nordhordland would be collected in one place and transported across Salhusfjorden to Åsane. By moving the ferry quay from Isdalstø to Knarvik, the length of the ferry service could be reduced. However, the fares would be kept the same and the extra revenue used to finance a bridge from Flatøy to Lindås. This allowed the Alversund Bridge to open in 1958, and the ferry service from Flatøy and Meland to move to Knarvik. The proposal to cross Salhusfjorden was launched during the planning of the Alversund Bridge. Cost estimates were made based on the Golden Gate Bridge in the United States, but it proved too expensive for a suspension bridge crossing between Frekhaug and Salhus.

In 1962, the issue was brought up again, this time as a pontoon bridge. The depth and steepness of the fjord would make it impossible to fasten the bridge to the sea bottom. However, a method without lateral anchorage had been developed for the Hobart Bridge in Australia. Another alternative was launched in 1963, involving a submerged floating tunnel through the fjord. It was estimated to cost between NOK 19.5 and 26 million. Norwegian expatriate Leif J. Sverdrup, co-founder of Sverdrup & Parcel of the United States, inspected the fjord in 1965 and was later hired to plan the bridge in cooperation with Oslo-based civil engineering consultants Prosjektering. Municipal engineers started measuring currents in 1966. Prosjektering and Sverdrup & Parcel recommended a pontoon bridge with a movable section to allow passage of ship traffic. In 1967, a new proposal was launched, in which a seaway tunnel would be blasted out in the rock on the Bergen side.

The Alversund Bridge was a toll bridge which was paying for the debt accumulated in its construction. By 1968, the debt would be paid off, but the Norwegian Public Roads Administration launched a plan whereby the tolls would continue to be collected and used to finance a bridge across Salhusfjorden. This was opposed by a group of locals, who brought the issue to the courts, claiming it to be illegal, as a bridge would never be built. Both Oslo District Court and Eidsivating Court of Appeal concluded that the tolls were legal, and the issue was rejected by the Supreme Court. Protests were also raised against the use of a pontoon bridge, as it would limit the vessel size and thus the commercial development in the inner parts of the fjord.

In the 1970s, National Road 1 (today part of E39) was established through Knarvik towards Sognefjorden, resulting in upgrades to the roads in Nordhordland, and making the crossing one of the main routes from the north. At the same time, it was decided to establish a refinery at Mongstad in Lindås. In 1971, details about the suspension bridge were again discussed, with three different proposals with the main span of between 1,090 and 1,210 meters (3,580 and 3,970 ft) with 160-meter (520 ft) tall pylons. There were protests from the Salhus area, as the suspension bridge would have resulted in the demolishing of part of the residential area.

In 1972, discussion started with the plans to connect Meland, Flatøy and Lindøy with bridges. This was passed by the Parliament of Norway in May 1975, and consisted of the Krossnessundet Bridge between Flatøy and Meland, which opened in November 1978. The Hagelsund Bridge opened on 1 April 1982 and connected Flatøy to Lindås and Knarvik, thus also connecting Meland and Lindås. Both bridges were partially financed with tolls. The plans for a pontoon bridge were presented to the Standing Committee on Transport and Communications on 31 March 1981. They supported the choice of a pontoon bridge. The decision to construct the bridge was taken by parliament on 9 December 1987, but they demanded that a larger ship channel be constructed.

Detailed planning started in March 1990, and at first two technical methods for constructing the pontoon bridge were considered: a continuous concrete floating caisson between the abutments, and a steel version incorporating a truss bridge carrying concrete pontoons. However, they were both rejected in favor of a concrete or steel box section borne on concrete pontoons.

=== Construction ===
Design of the bridge was awarded to Aas-Jakobsen and Det Norske Veritas, the former who also performed dynamic analysis and structural engineering. Architects were Hindhammer–Sundt–Thomassen, Lund & Løvseth, and Lund & Slaatto. An H pylon was chosen instead of an A pylon both because it was more functional, and would be more aesthetic in conjunction with the other bridges in the area, particularly three suspension bridges.

The technology for the bridge was based on recent technology for pontoon bridges combined with Norwegian offshore technology. Among the technologies initially considered, but later ruled out, was that used in the Homer M. Hadley Memorial Bridge and the Hood Canal Bridge in the United States. Instead, an orthotropic deck was chosen, such as the Bergsøysund Bridge had used. The choice of a box girder bridge and the orthotropic deck were chosen because it gave the lower material use. Conventional pontoon bridges have lateral anchorage systems which fasten the bridge to the seabed. The technique had previously been used down to 140 meters (460 ft), but Salhusfjorden is 500 meters (1,600 ft) deep, making the method prohibitively expensive. The choice of a cable-stayed section allowed reduced traffic hazards in storms, a reduction in corrosion on the bridge deck, and improved passage of water beneath the bridge in support of wildlife.

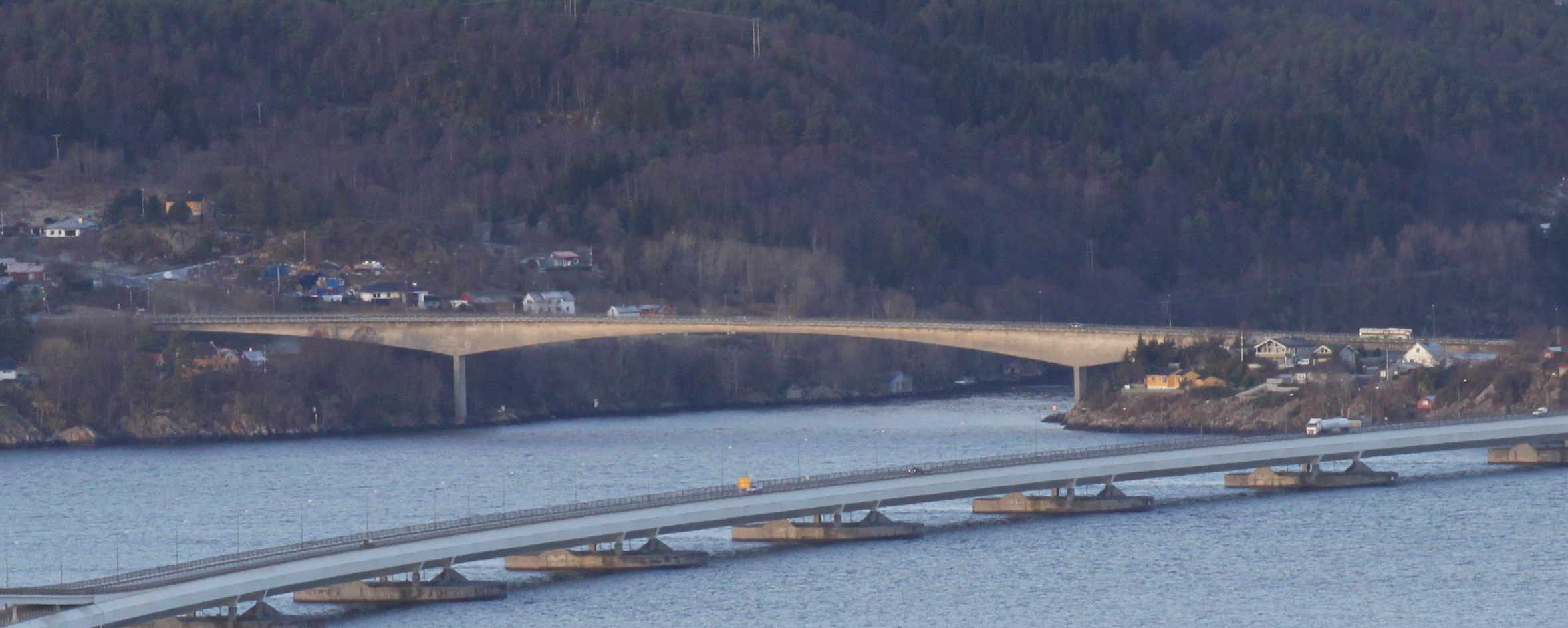
The pontoon bridge with the Krossnessundet Bridge in the background

The contract for construction of the pontoon bridge was awarded in August 1991 to a consortium, Arbeidsfellesskapet Salhus Bru, which consisted of Norwegian Contractors, Aker Entreprenør, Veidekke and Kværner Eureka. The components were built in Moss and Fredrikstad and then shipped to Lonevågen, a branch of Osterfjorden which was suitable to connect the parts. There were problems welding the high-strength low-alloy steel, which resulted in the work being halted for several days before an agreement was reached between the contractor and the Public Roads Administration. On 26 January 1994, the steel frame which would be used to fasten the pontoon bridge to the cable-stayed bridge, came adrift during transport in Skagerrak, and was severely damaged, causing a delay in the project. As the bridge had the longest laterally unsupported span in the world, the construction was watched by many international delegations.

The construction of the bridge also involved other investments in road infrastructure. This included 5.7 kilometers (3.5 mi) of new highways, 4.2 kilometers (2.6 mi) of local roads, and the 785-meter (2,575 ft) long Hordvik Tunnel just south of the bridge. A grade-separated crossing was built on both sides of the bridge. The intersection on Flatøy was also built as a bus interchange, and became the terminus of many bus routes in Nordhordland. Express buses would from there run directly to the city center of Bergen.

The bridge project cost NOK 910 million, of which NOK 513 was for the pontoon bridge, NOK 81 million was for the cable-stayed bridge, NOK 25 million was used for the waterway, NOK 115 million was used on planning, and NOK 176 million was used on auxiliary roads and the tunnel. The bridge was financed with NOK 41 million in state grants, NOK 139 million from tolls paid in advance, and NOK 730 million in debt which would be repaid by the tolls. Interest during construction cost NOK 138 million. The construction involved 1,150,000 man-hours.

=== Aftermath ===
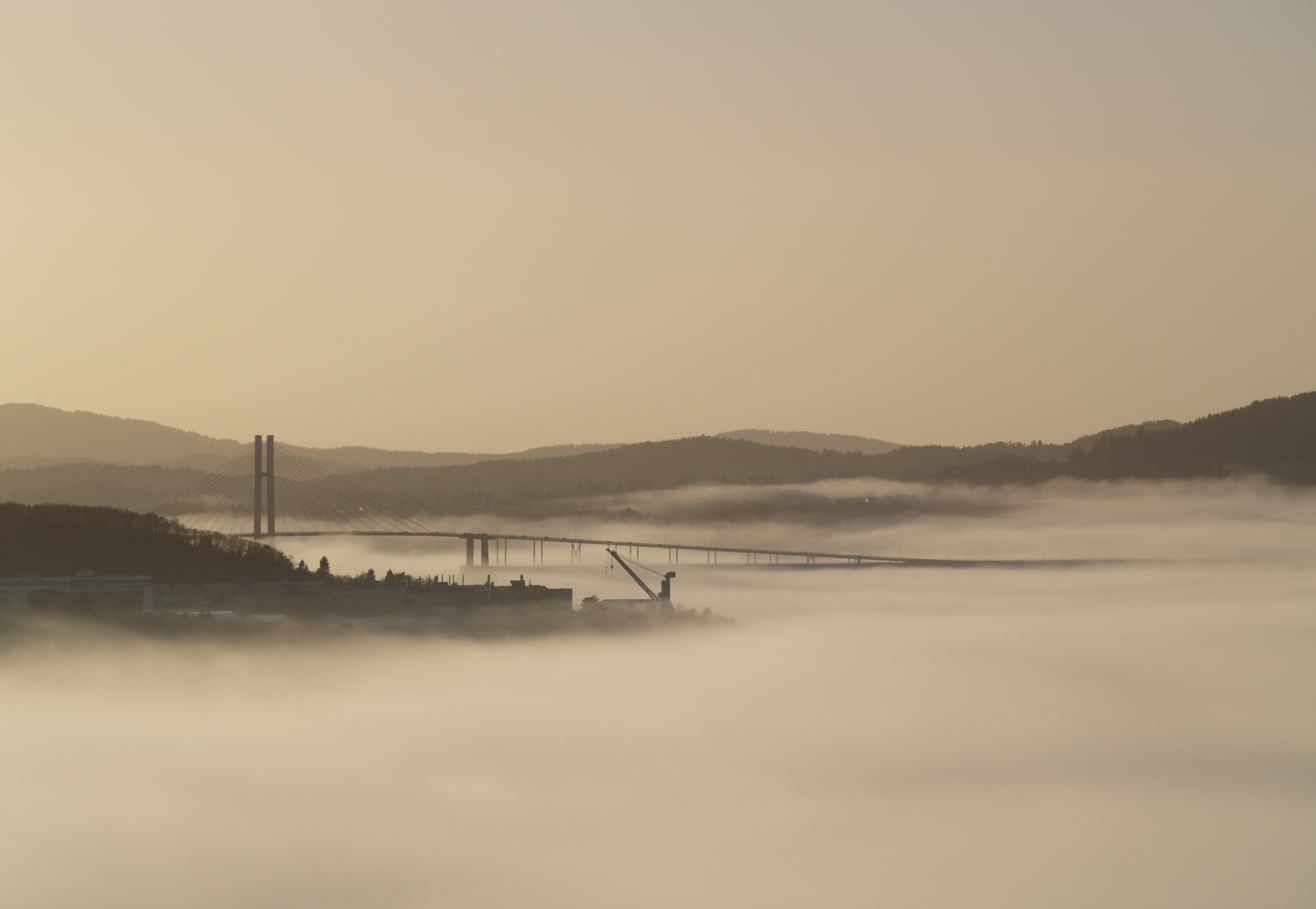
The bridge during fog

The use of high-strength steel caused problems as it was necessary to heat the steel to 150 °C (302 °F) before and after welding, and Kværner had problems finding an adequate process during late 1992. In January 1993, an appropriate process had been found, although experimentation with various methods continued for another six months. Kværner felt that the Public Roads Administration should bear the extra costs, demanding NOK 108 million in compensation, but the administration denied this, resulting in a lawsuit. On 26 January 1996, Nordhordland District Court supported the administration, but gave the plaintiff partial support, claiming the administration should take part of the costs through improper choice of material. The Public Roads Administration was sentenced to pay NOK 34 million to Kværner. Both sides appealed to Gulating Court of Appeal, which on 18 February 1998 refuted all of Kværner's claim regarding the steel boxes, and sentenced the administration to pay NOK 7.5 million. In addition, Kværner had to pay the administration NOK 19.5 million in penalties for overrunning the contract date. However, the court's decision was not unanimous. The plaintiff appealed to case to the Supreme Court, who unanimously confirmed the ruling of Gulating Court of Appeal. In addition, the plaintiff was sentenced to pay the defendants legal costs of NOK 910,000.

The bridge was officially opened by King Harald V on 22 September 1994. It was the second pontoon bridge in Norway, after the Bergsøysund Bridge which opened in 1992. The last tolls were collected on 31 December 2005. In 2008, there were 19,700 travelers on the bridge each day, 14 percent of which used public transport. In 2009, the bridge had an average daily traffic (ADT) of 14,698 vehicles, up from 7975 in 2000. Following the removal of the tolls, the ADT increased from 9912 in 2005 to 12,249 in 2006. In 2010, the bridge was one of twelve finalists in Teknisk Ukeblad's competition for the most beautiful bridge in Norway. In December 2010, Bergen City Council approved the Nordhordland Package, which would result in NOK 3.8 billion being used on road investments in Åsane and Nordhordland. Two-thirds of the financing is to come from tolls, which will involve reinstalling a toll plaza on the bridge. The tolls will first be set to NOK 20 for five years, and then after the completion of the first stage, the toll will be NOK 40 for fifteen years. The toll plaza was scheduled to reopen in 2013. As of 2026, the toll plaza has not been reinstated. Among the projects is a new four-lane Nyborg Tunnel which will shorten the distance of E39 from the bridge with the motorway at Nyborg in Bergen.
