= Rossland, Norway =

Village in Alver Municipality, Norway

Rossland Vikebø
- Village
- Interactive map of Rossland; Vikebø
- Coordinates: 60.56238°N 5.05097°E
- Country: Norway
- Region: Western Norway
- County: Vestland
- District: Nordhordland
- Municipality: Alver Municipality

Area
  - Total: 0.4 km^{2} (0.15 sq mi)
- Elevation: 10 m (33 ft)

Population (2025)
  - Total: 321
  - Density: 803/km^{2} (2,080/sq mi)
- Time zone: UTC+01:00 (CET)
  - Summer (DST): UTC+02:00 (CEST)
- Post Code: 5917 Rossland

Rossland or Vikebø is a village area in Alver Municipality in Vestland county, Norway. The village sits on the northern part of the island of Holsnøy, about 3 kilometres (1.9 mi) northeast of the coastal village of Io. The village lies along the shores of the Rosslandspollen bay, and it is the largest village area on the northern part of the island of Holsnøy.

The 0.4-square-kilometre (99-acre) village has a population (2025) of 321 and a population density of 803 inhabitants per square kilometre (2,080/sq mi).
