= Isdalstø =

Village in Alver Municipality, Norway

Isdalstø Isdalsstø
- Village
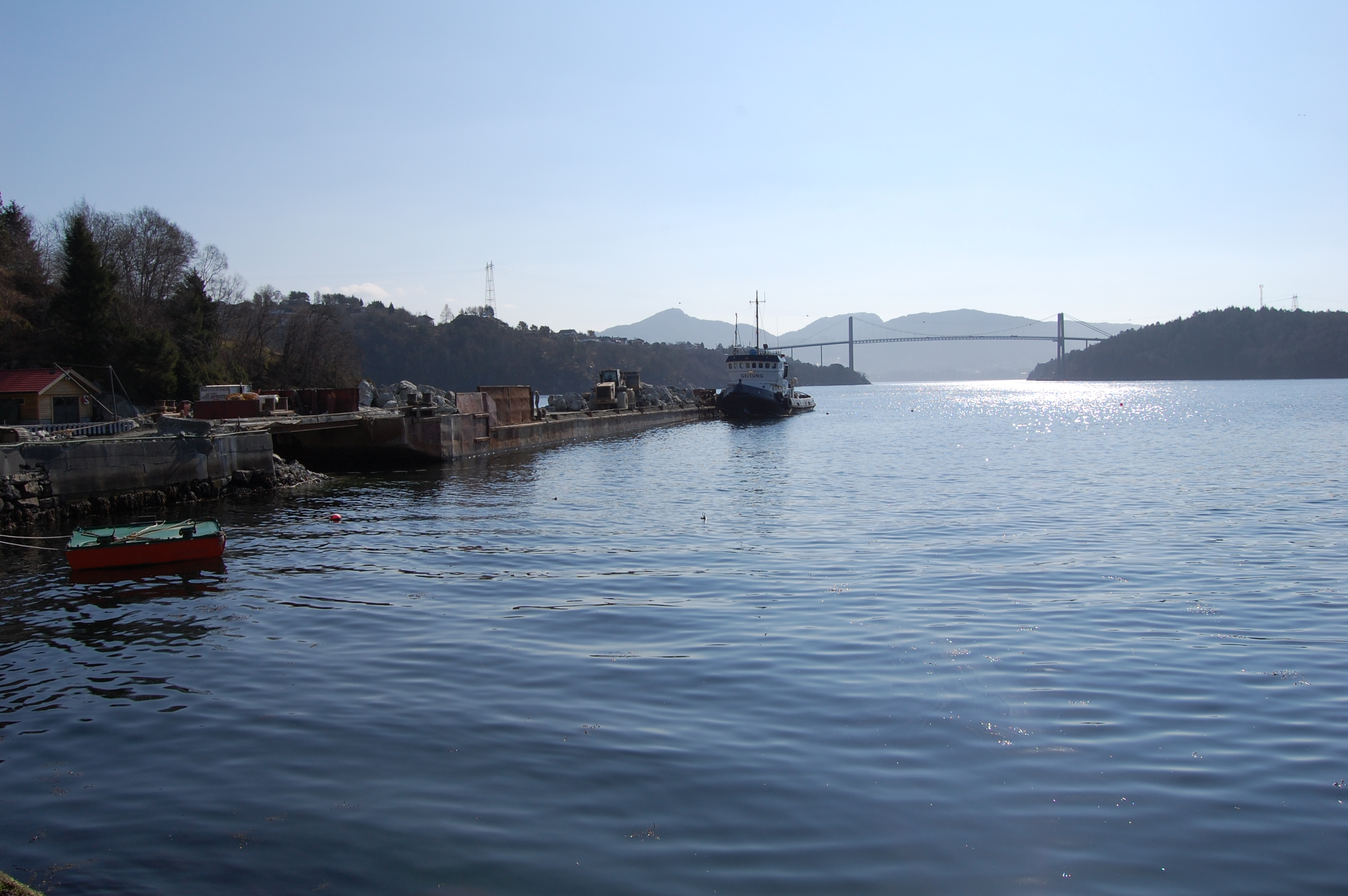
- View of the village
- Interactive map of Isdalstø
- Coordinates: 60.55533°N 5.26937°E
- Country: Norway
- Region: Western Norway
- County: Vestland
- District: Nordhordland
- Municipality: Alver Municipality
- Elevation: 9 m (30 ft)
- Time zone: UTC+01:00 (CET)
  - Summer (DST): UTC+02:00 (CEST)
- Post Code: 5916 Isdalstø

Isdalstø is a village in Alver Municipality in Vestland county, Norway. The village lies along the southern end of the Radfjorden between the villages of Alversund and Knarvik. It was a central hub for ferry traffic until the 1970s.
