= Krossnessundet Bridge =

Krossnessundet Bridge Krossnessundetbrua
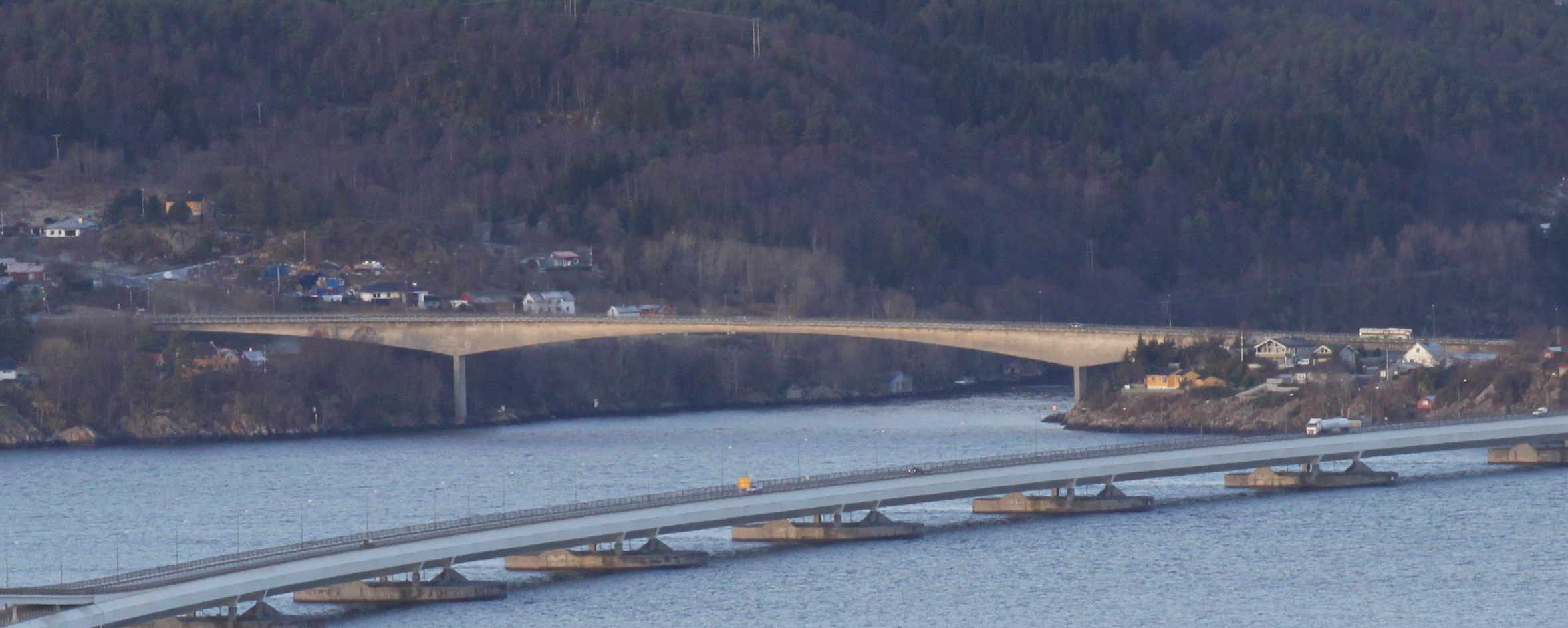
- View of the Krossnessundet Bridge in the background (behind the Nordhordland Bridge)
- Coordinates: 60.5310°N 5.2545°E
- Carries: Fv564
- Crosses: Krossnessundet strait
- Locale: Alver Municipality, Norway

Characteristics
- Total length: 392 metres (1,286 ft)
- Longest span: 175 metres (574 ft)

Location
- Interactive map of Krossnessundet Bridge

The Krossnessundet Bridge (Norwegian: Krossnessundet bru) is a cantilever bridge in Alver Municipality in Vestland county, Norway. The bridge connects the islands of Holsnøy and Flatøy on the north side of the Salhusfjorden. The village of Krossneset is located at the eastern end of the bridge. Opened in 1978, it is part of County Road 564. It is 391 metres (1,283 ft) long and has a main span of 175 metres (574 ft).
