= Radfjorden =

Fjord in Vestland, Norway

- Interactive map of Radfjorden
- Location: Vestland county, Norway
- Coordinates: 60.59681°N 5.14726°E
- Type: Fjord
- Basin countries: Norway
- Max. length: 10 kilometres (6.2 mi)

Radfjorden is a fjord in Alver Municipality in Vestland county, Norway. The 10-kilometre (6.2 mi) long fjord runs between the islands of Radøy and Holsnøy. The northwestern end of the fjord is called the Mangerfjorden and it flows out into the Hjeltefjorden. The southeastern end of the fjord is also known as Kvernafjord, and it flows out into the confluence of three other fjords: Salhusfjorden, Osterfjorden, and Sørfjorden. The fjord is a good fishing area, and it is also good for catching crab and shrimp.

== See also ==
- List of Norwegian fjords
