= Hagelsund Bridge =

Hagelsund Bridge Hagelsundbrua
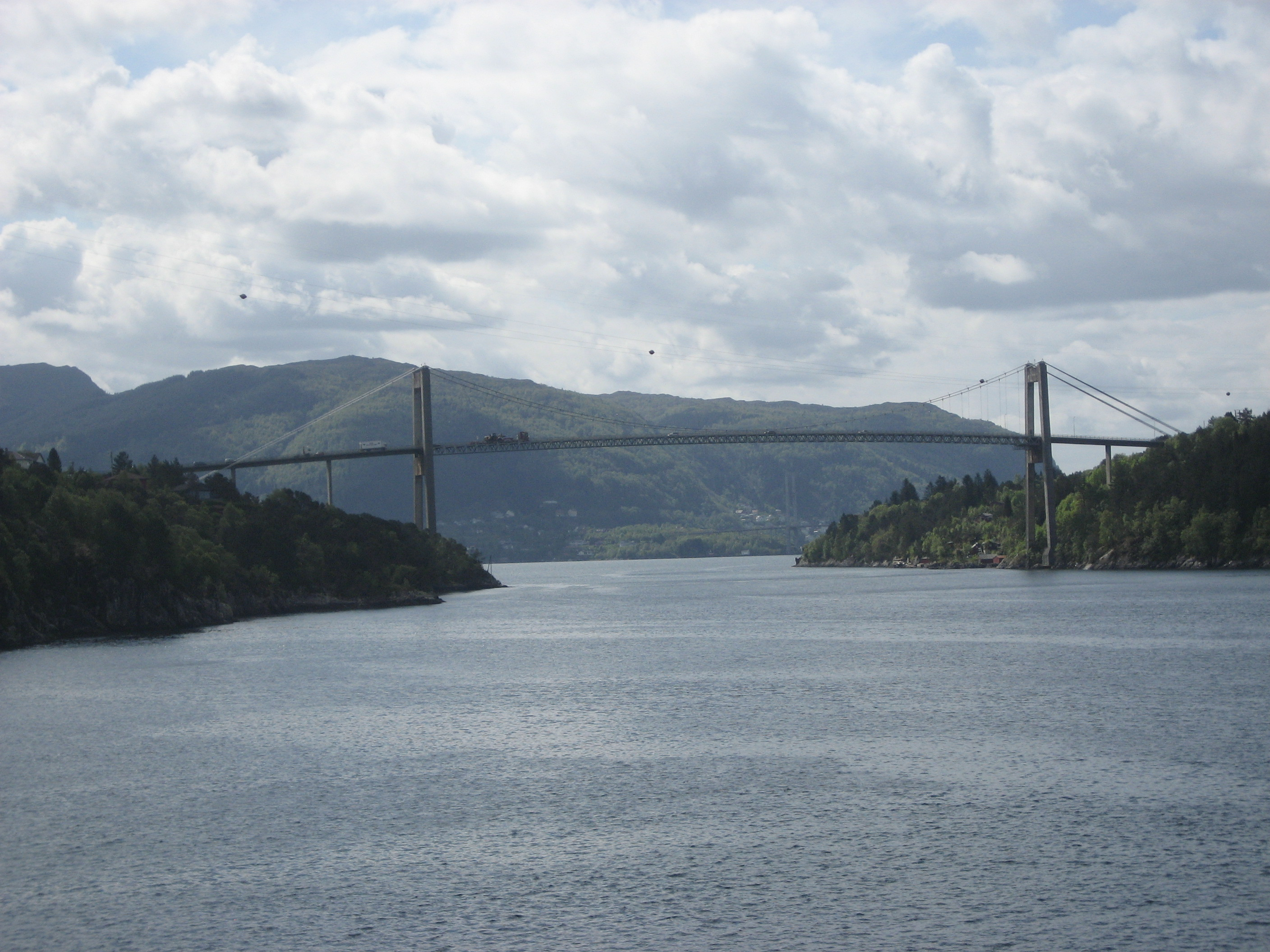
- View of the bridge
- Coordinates: 60°32′36″N 5°16′18″E
- Carries: E39
- Crosses: Hagelsundet strait
- Locale: Alver Municipality, Norway

Characteristics
- Total length: 623 metres (2,044 ft)
- Longest span: 250 metres (820 ft)
- No. of spans: 9
- Clearance below: 50 metres (160 ft)

History
- Opened: 1982

Location
- Interactive map of Hagelsund Bridge

The Hagelsund Bridge (Norwegian: Hagelsundbrua) is a suspension bridge in Alver Municipality in Vestland county, Norway. The bridge connects the island of Flatøy with the village of Knarvik on the mainland. The length of the bridge is 623 metres (2,044 ft). The length of the main span, i.e. the suspended roadway between the bridge's towers, is 250 metres (820 ft).

The bridge consists of 2 lanes with car traffic heading in opposite directions, and a walkway for pedestrians and bicycles. The bridge has a 50-metre (160 ft) clearance above the ocean for boats to pass beneath the bridge.

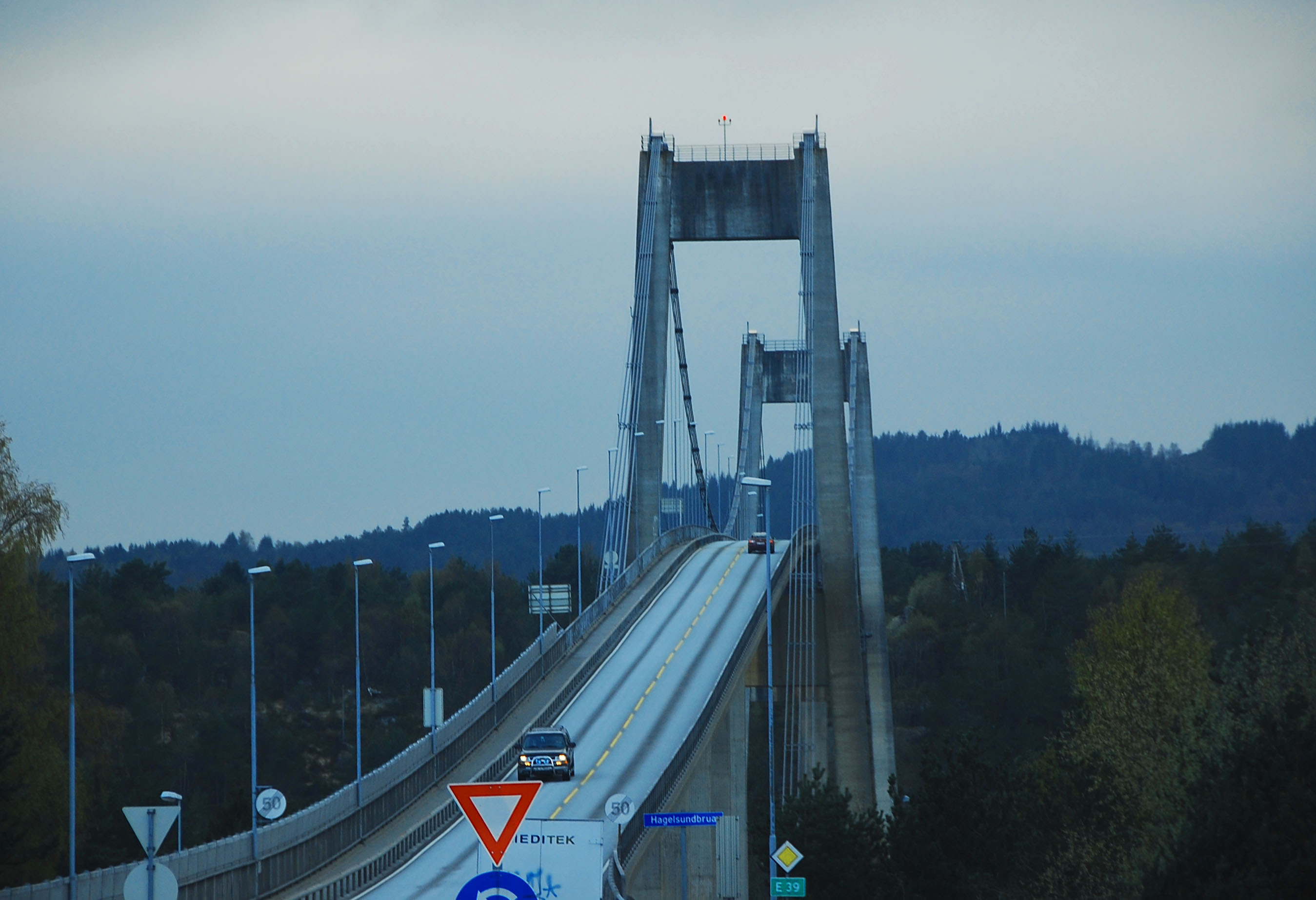
The Hagelsund Bridge at dusk

The bridge was opened in 1982 and together with the Nordhordland Bridge and the Krossnessundet Bridge, it is a part of the triangular bridge network connecting Flatøy with the island of Holsnøy to the west, the city of Bergen to the south, and Alver Municipality to the east.

== See also ==
- List of bridges in Norway
- List of bridges in Norway by length
