= Frekhaug =

Village in Alver Municipality, Norway

- Village
- Interactive map of Frekhaug
- Coordinates: 60.51321°N 5.24252°E
- Country: Norway
- Region: Western Norway
- County: Vestland
- District: Nordhordland
- Municipality: Alver Municipality

Area
  - Total: 1.78 km^{2} (0.69 sq mi)
- Elevation: 18 m (59 ft)

Population (2025)
  - Total: 3,683
  - Density: 2,069/km^{2} (5,360/sq mi)
- Time zone: UTC+01:00 (CET)
  - Summer (DST): UTC+02:00 (CEST)
- Post Code: 5918 Frekhaug

Frekhaug is a village in Alver Municipality, located in Vestland county, Norway. The village sits at the southern tip of the island of Holsnøy, along the Salhusfjorden.

The 1.78-square-kilometre (440-acre) village has a population (2025) of 3,683 and a population density of 2,064 inhabitants per square kilometre (5,350/sq mi).

== History ==
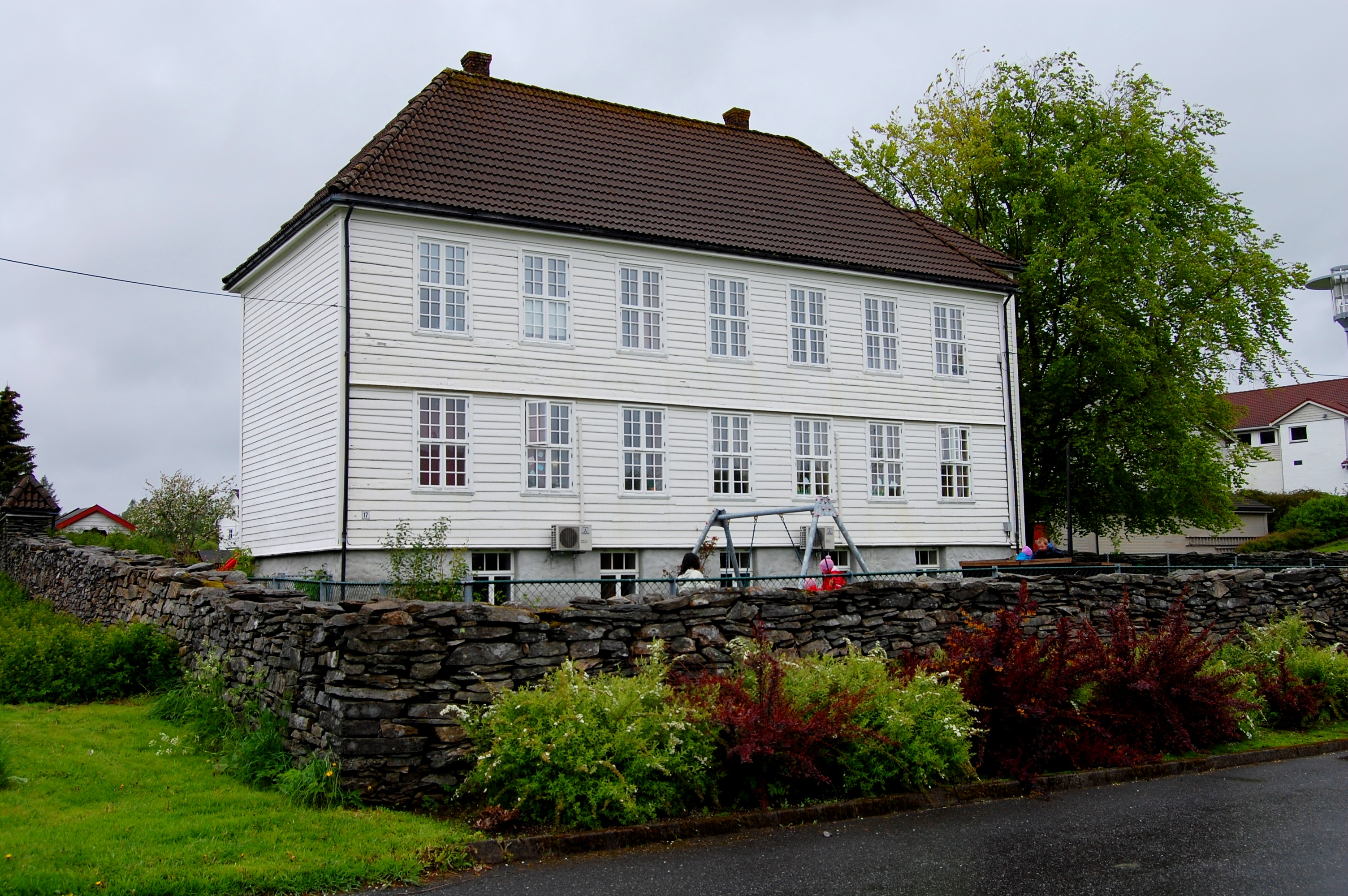
Frekhaug hovedgård

Prior to 2020, the village was the administrative centre of the old Meland Municipality.

=== Frekhaug Manor ===
Frekhaug Manor (Frekhaug hovedgård) is a manor house and farm located on the southeast side of Holsnøy. The main house is a notched, two-story log house of painted white panel with a hipped roof. The building has a portal in rococo style. The building was probably built in the 1780s and is surrounded by granite walls. In 1780, the farm was bought by skipper Cort Abrahamsen Holtermann (1730-1813). Since 1914, the manor house has been owned by the Nordhordland home mission (Nordhordland indremisjon), a missions group of the Church of Norway.

== Notable people ==
- Trond Bjørndal, a football coach and former player
