= Knarvik =

Village in Alver Municipality, Norway

Knarvik Knarrviki / Knarrevik (unofficial)
- Village
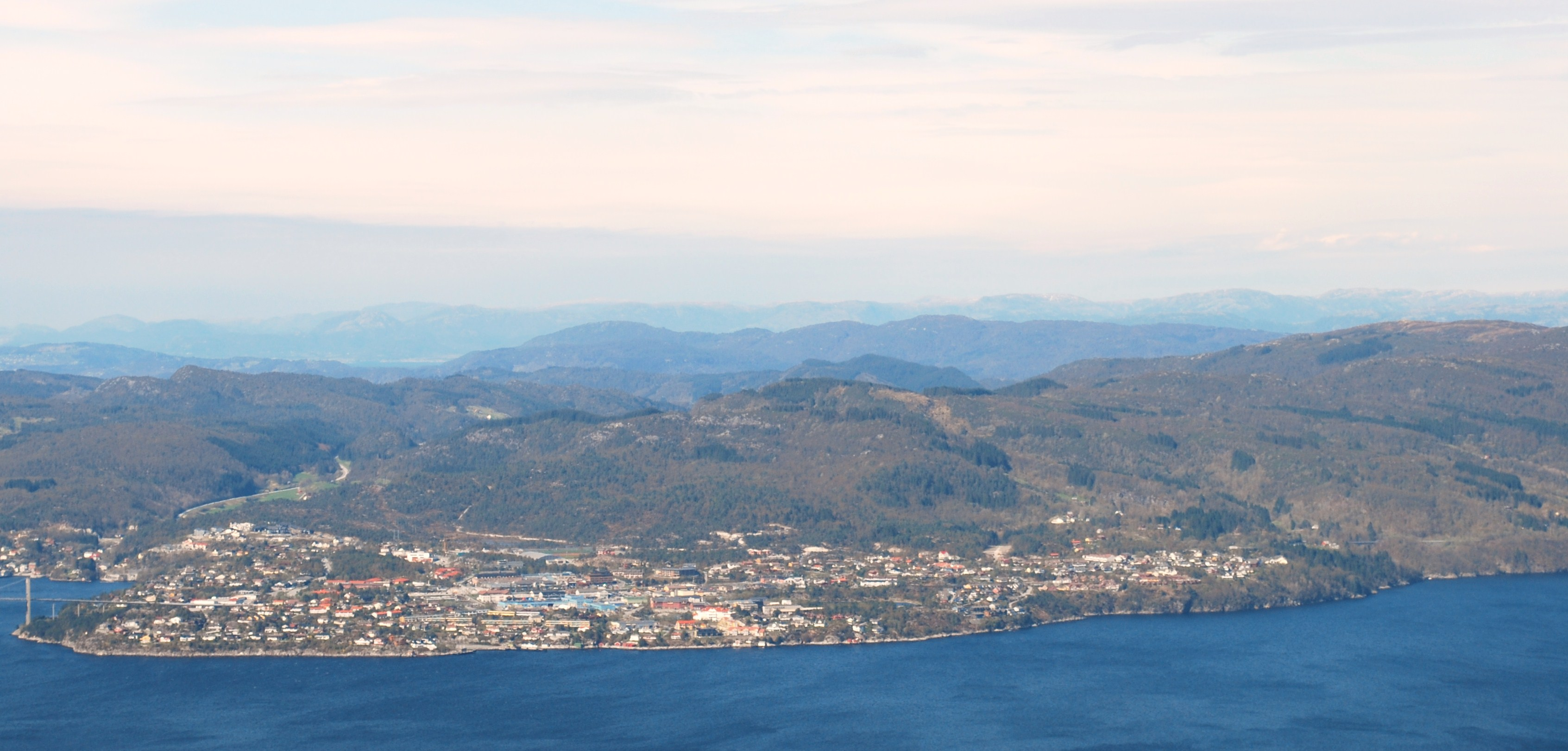
- View of the village (looking north)
- Interactive map of Knarvik
- Coordinates: 60.54591°N 5.28509°E
- Country: Norway
- Region: Western Norway
- County: Vestland
- District: Nordhordland
- Municipality: Alver Municipality

Area
  - Total: 3.67 km^{2} (1.42 sq mi)
- Elevation: 36 m (118 ft)

Population (2025)
  - Total: 6,594
  - Density: 1,797/km^{2} (4,650/sq mi)
- Time zone: UTC+01:00 (CET)
  - Summer (DST): UTC+02:00 (CEST)
- Post Code: 5914 Isdalstø

Knarvik is the administrative centre of Alver Municipality in Vestland county, Norway. The village is located on the mainland, about 20 km (12 mi) straight north of Bergen at the confluence of four fjords: Osterfjorden (heading east), Sørfjorden (heading southeast), Salhusfjorden (heading southwest), and the Radfjorden (heading northwest). The village of Isdalstø lies immediately north of Knarvik.

The 3.67-square-kilometre (910-acre) village has a population (2025) of 6,594 and a population density of 1,797 inhabitants per square kilometre (4,650/sq mi). This makes it the largest settlement in the Nordhordland district of Vestland county.

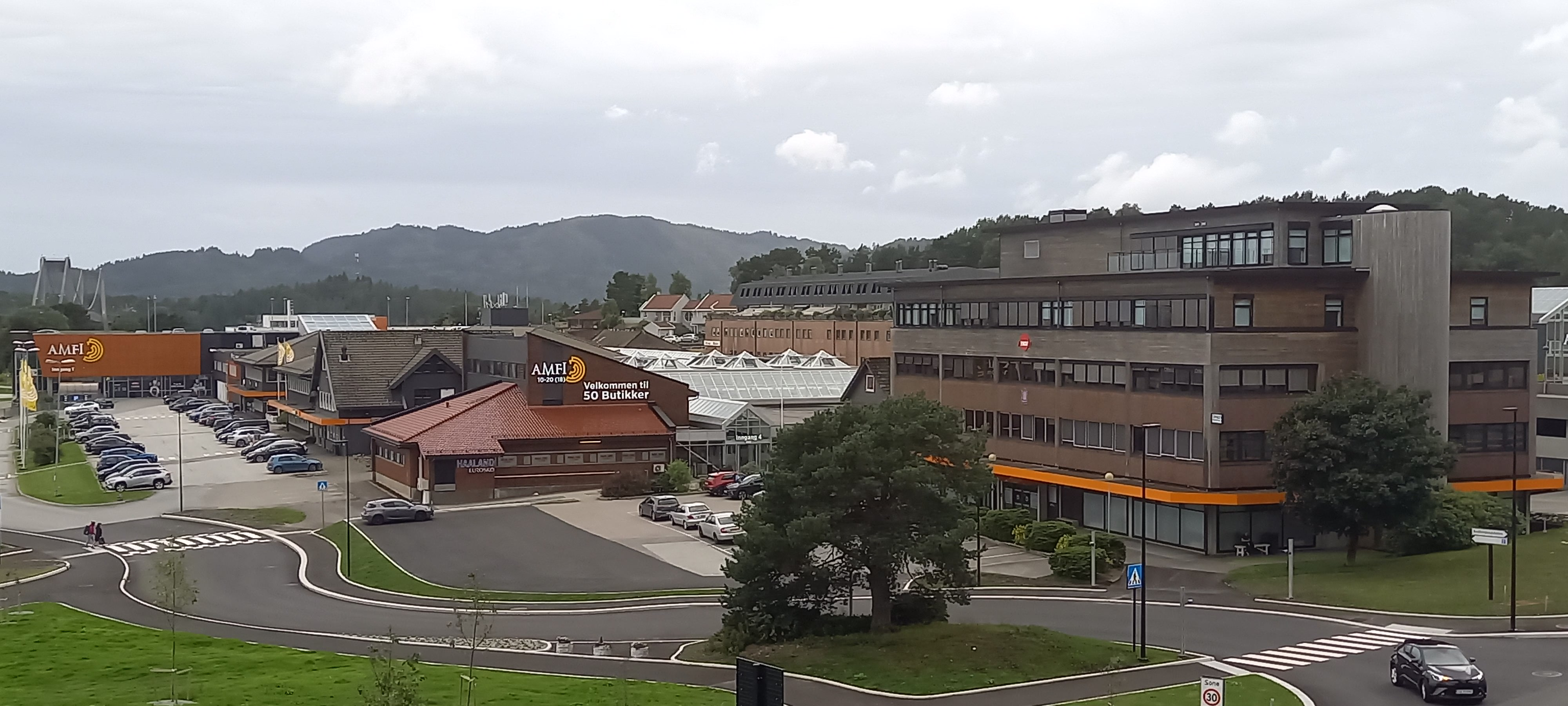
Amfi Knarvik shopping mall

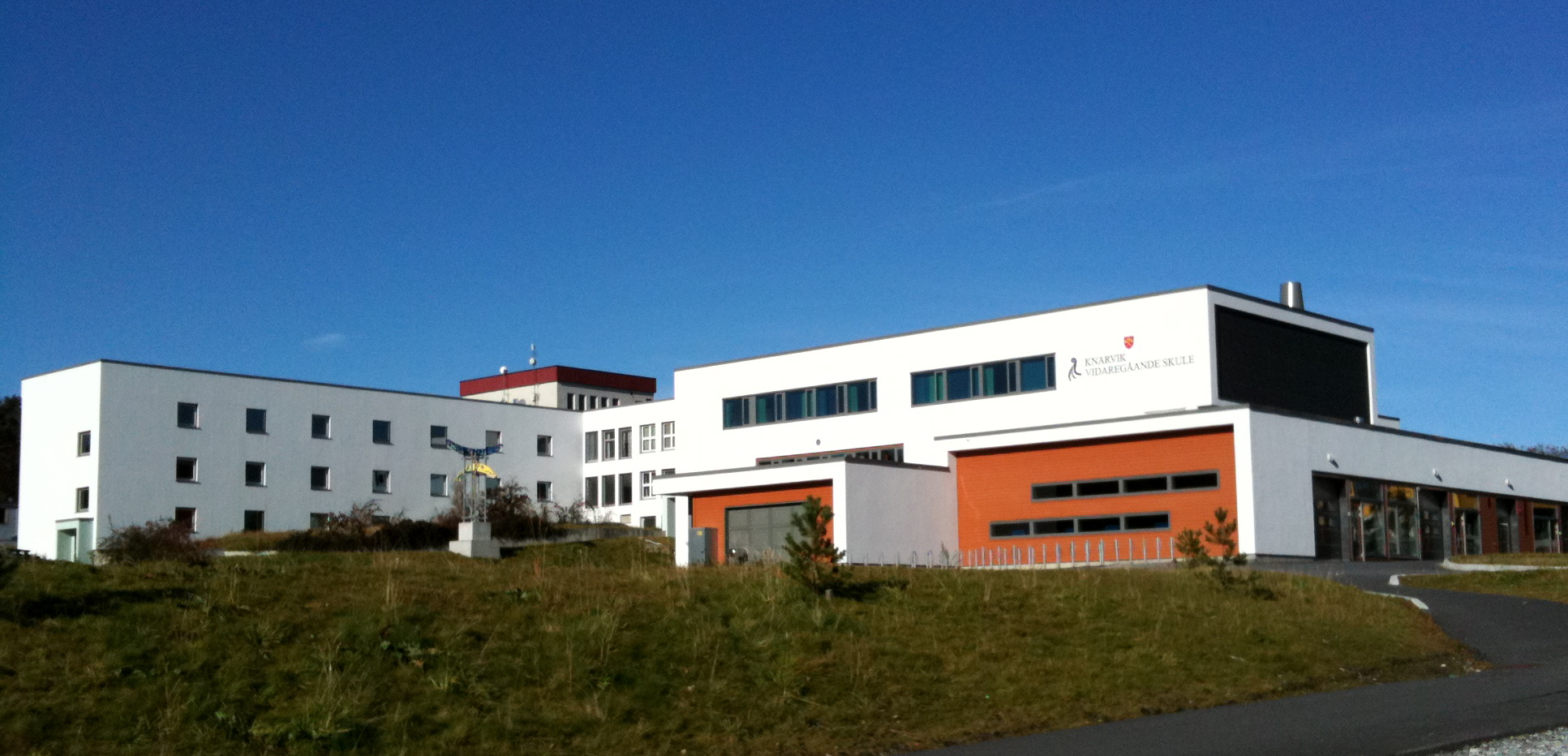
Knarvik videregåande skule

The centre of the village is the site of the Knarvik Senter, the largest shopping centre in Nordhordland with 61 stores. The European route E39 highway runs straight through the village dividing it into two major parts. The northern part is where the large shopping mall is located while the southern part is still in its original state with scattered buildings and shops.

Knarvik has several kindergartens, a junior high school, and a regional high school (Knarvik vidaregåande skule) with more than 1,000 students. The newly built Knarvik Church was completed in 2014 to serve the growing community. Before its completion, residents had to travel up to Alversund Church in the village of Alversund, located about 4 km (2.5 mi) to the north.

== Transportation ==
In recent years population and traffic have increased creating demand for an upgrade of the infrastructure. Rush hour traffic is an increasingly common sight.

Today, Knarvik is connected with Bergen Municipality to the south via the Hagelsund Bridge (finished 1982) and the Nordhordland Bridge (finished 1994). The car ferry connection between Knarvik and Bergen (Knarvik – Steinestø), which historically transported cars and people between the two places was in use up until the completion of the Nordhordland Bridge. That ferry connection was at one time carrying more vehicles than any other car ferry connection in Norway.
