= Holsnøy =

Island in Vestland county, Norway

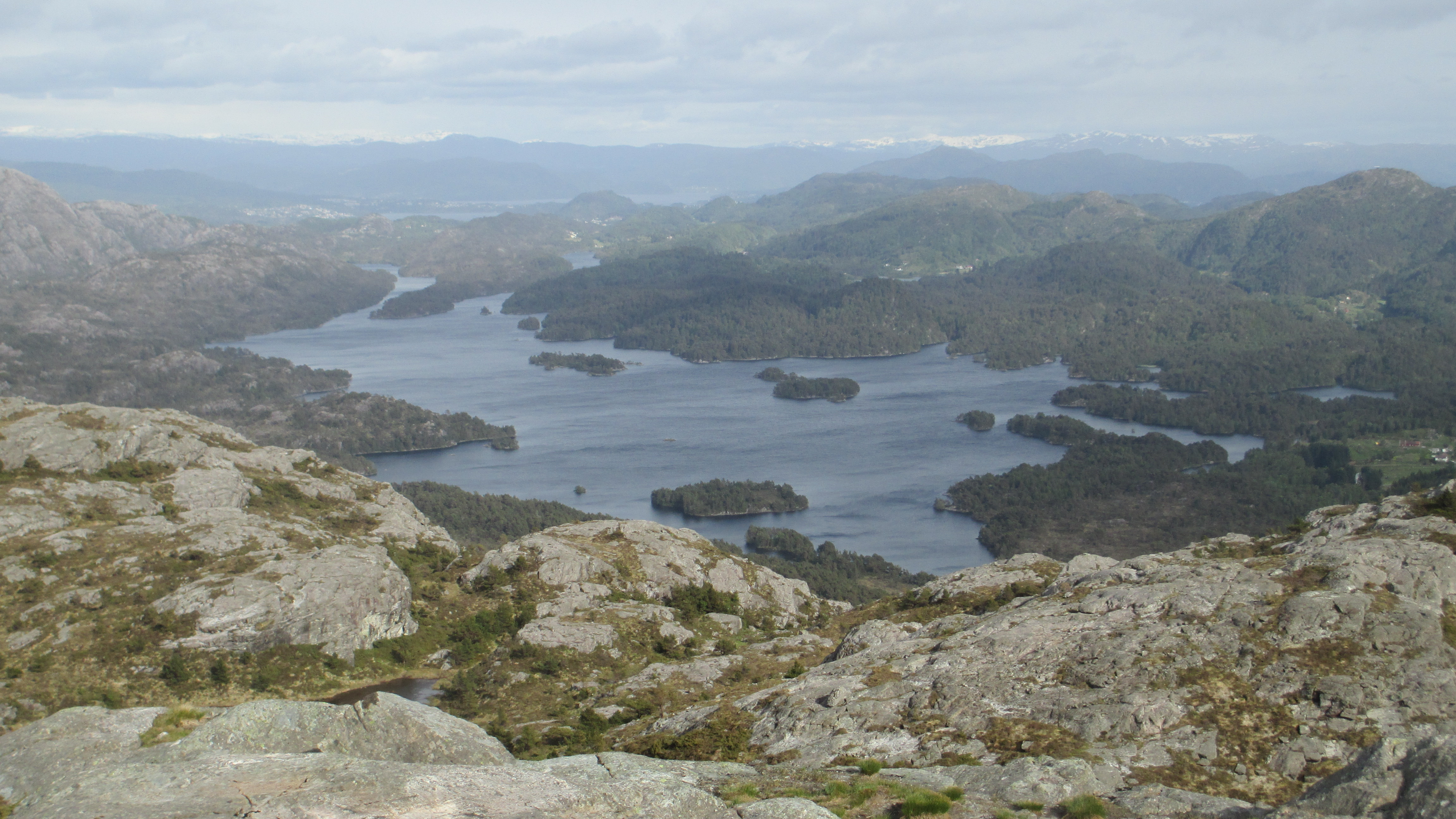
- The lake Storavatnet in the rural inner part of the island.
- Interactive map of Holsnøy

Geography
- Location: Vestland, Norway
- Coordinates: 60.5323°N 5.2177°E
- Area: 88.8 km^{2} (34.3 sq mi)
- Length: 20 km (12 mi)
- Width: 7.5 km (4.66 mi)
- Highest elevation: 324 m (1063 ft)
- Highest point: Eldsfjellet

Administration
- Norway
- County: Vestland
- Municipality: Alver Municipality

Holsnøy is an island in Alver Municipality in Vestland county, Norway. The 88.8-square-kilometre (34.3 sq mi) island lies to the north/west of the mainland, between the islands of Radøy to the north and Askøy to the south. The highest point on the island is the 324-metre (1,063 ft) tall Eldsfjellet, a mountain located about 2 kilometres (1.2 mi) north of the village of Rossland. The island is hilly and marshy, with the majority of the residents living along the southern shore. The largest settlement on the island is the village of Frekhaug on the southern shore.

The island is connected to the mainland road network by a series of bridges. The Krossnessundet Bridge connects the southern tip of the island to the small island of Flatøy, just to the east. The island of Flatøy is connected to the village of Knarvik (to the east on the mainland Lindås peninsula) by the Hagelsund Bridge and Flatøy is also connected to Bergen Municipality to the south on the Åsane peninsula by the Nordhordland Bridge.

== History ==
Holsnøy was part of the old Meland Municipality until 2020 when it joined Alver Municipality. Holsnøy island made up 96% of the land area of Meland Municipality.

=== Frekhaug Manor ===
Frekhaug Manor (Frekhaug hovedgård) is a manor house located on the southeast side of Holsnøy. The main house is a notched, two-story log house of painted white panel with a hipped roof. The building has a portal in rococo style. The building was probably built in the 1780s and is surrounded by granite walls. In 1780, the farm was bought by skipper Cort Abrahamsen Holtermann (1730–1813). Since 1914 the farm and manor house have been owned by the Nordhordland home mission (Nordhordland indremisjon), a missions group that is part of the Church of Norway.

== See also ==
- List of islands of Norway
