= Nordhordland =

- District
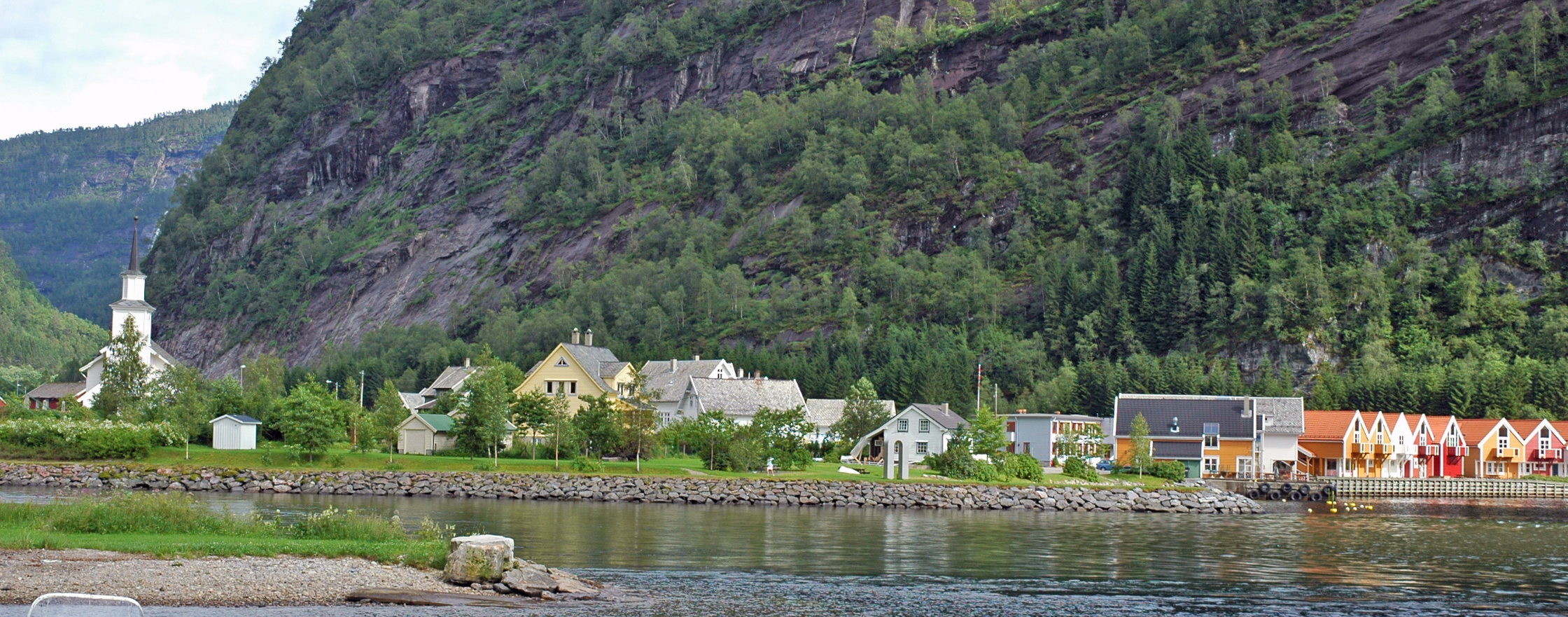
- View of Mo in Modalen
- Interactive map of Nordhordland
- Coordinates: 60°39′N 05°16′E
- Country: Norway
- County: Vestland
- Region: Vestlandet
- Commercial Center: Knarvik

Area
  - Total: 2,686 km^{2} (1,037 sq mi)

Population (2025)
  - Total: 47,731
  - Density: 17.77/km^{2} (46.02/sq mi)

Nordhordland is a traditional district in the western part of Norway. The district consists of the northern portion of the old Hordaland county (now part of Vestland county), north of the city of Bergen. It includes the municipalities of Alver, Austrheim, Fedje, Masfjorden, Modalen, Osterøy, and Vaksdal. The district roughly corresponds to the Nordhordland prosti, a Church of Norway deanery. Historically, Gulen Municipality to the north was included in the district.

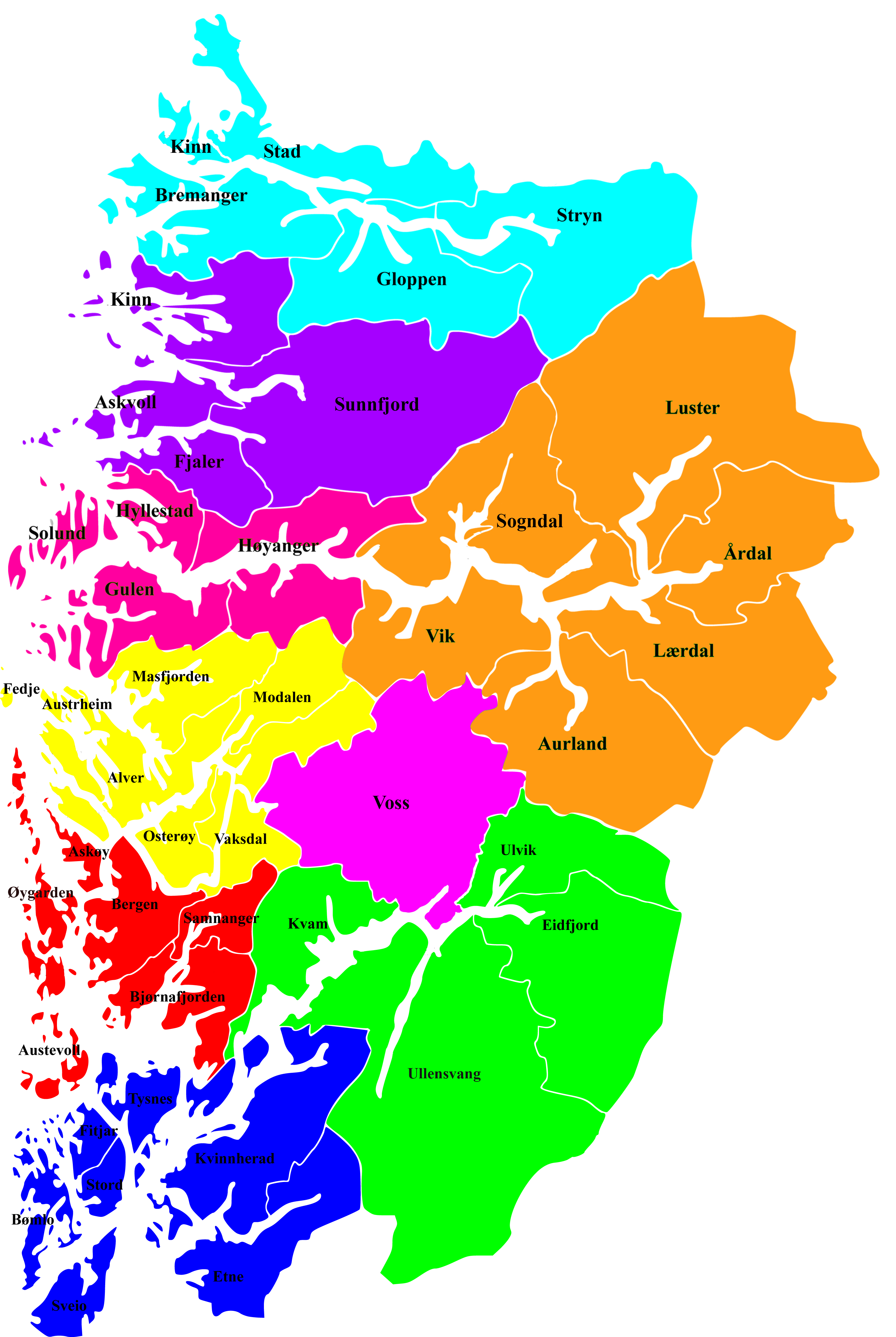
Districts of Vestland: Nordfjord Sunnfjord Indre Sogn Ytre Sogn Nordhordland Midthordland Sunnhordland Hardanger Voss

== Name ==
The meaning of the name is "the northern part of Hordaland".

== Geography ==
The landscape of Nordhordland is mountainous, but the mountains are not as high as in other areas. The only areas with mountains over 1,000-metre (3,300 ft) tall are in Vaksdal Municipality, Modalen Municipality, and Masfjorden Municipality. The highest peak in the district is in Modalen Municipality: the mountain Runderabben, reaching a height of 1,292 metres (4,239 ft) above sea level.

The fjords in the outer regions generally run in a northwesterly-southeasterly run. The main fjords in the district are the Hjeltefjorden in the outermost part and the Fensfjorden and Masfjorden in the north. The Osterfjorden-Romarheimsfjorden runs through the central part of the district.

Some of the largest islands in the district include Osterøy, Holsnøy, Radøy, Fosnøyna, and Fedje.

== Economy ==
Nordhordland has many well-developed islands, with much more undeveloped, rural inland areas. The largest urban areas are Knarvik (6594 inhabitants), Frekhaug (3683 inhabitants), Lindås (1448 inhabitants), Valestrandfossen (1380 inhabitants), Dale (1159 inhabitants), and Manger (1142 inhabitants). The largest industry in the district is the large oil refinery at Mongstad in Alver and Austrheim. Manufacturing is the largest industry as a whole, but farming and fishing are most common in the more rural areas both inland and along the coast. There are several large fish farming operations in the coastal areas. Considerable hydro-electric power is produced in the inner parts of the district, especially in Vaksdal, Modalen, and Masfjorden.
