= Lindås =

Lindås or Lindaas may refer to:

== Places ==
- Lindås (village), a village in Alver Municipality in Vestland county, Norway
- Lindås Municipality, a former municipality in the old Hordaland county, Norway
- Lindås Church, a church in Alver Municipality in Vestland county, Norway

== People ==
- Arne Lindaas (1924-2011), a Norwegian painter, printmaker, sculptor, and glassmaker
