= Ludvig Daae (priest) =

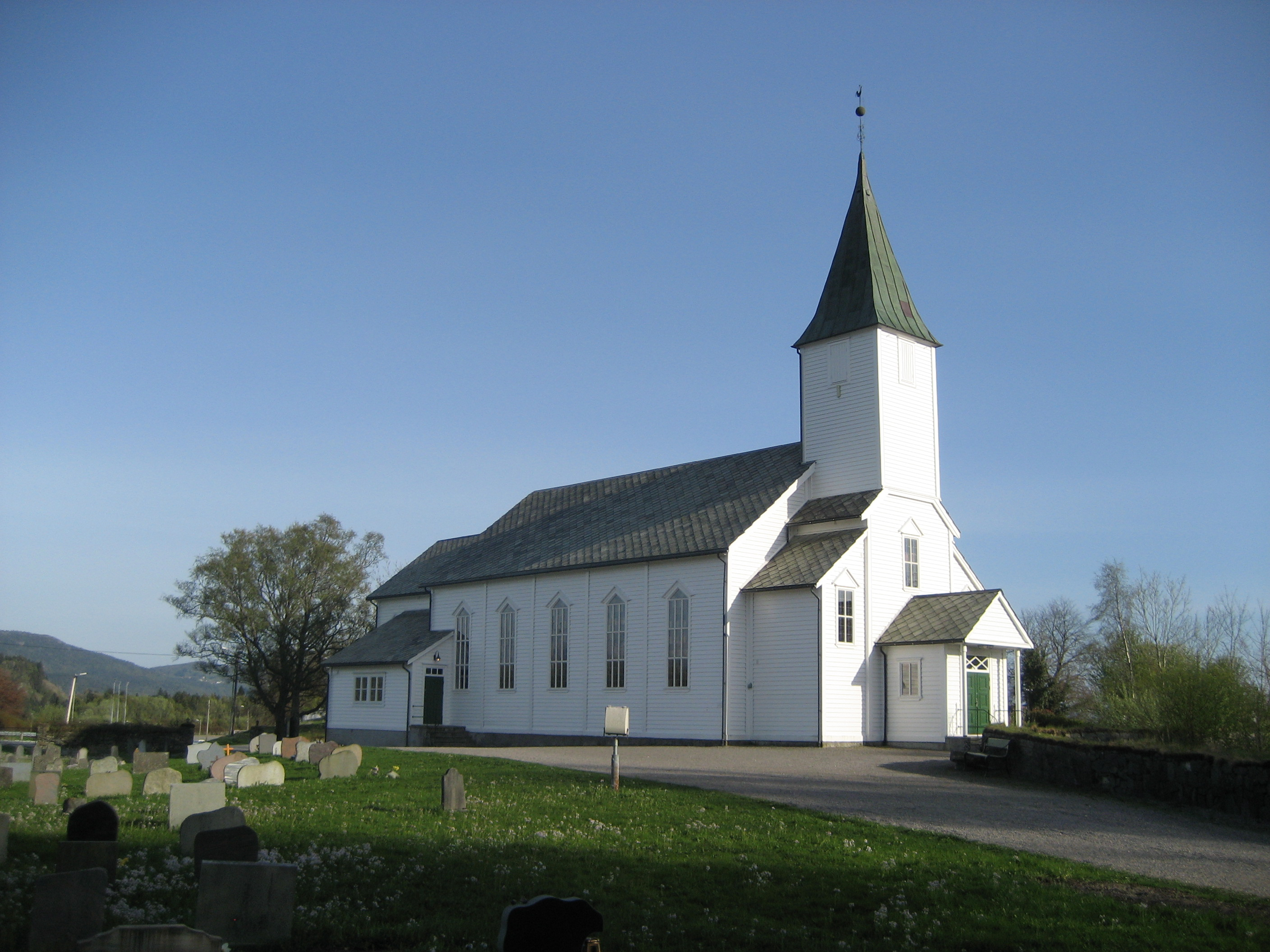
The current Lindås Church

Ludvig Daae (May 9, 1723 – February 18, 1786) was a Norwegian priest and landowner.

Daae was born in the parish of Vik in Nordre Bergenhus county, the son of Anders Daae (1680–1763) and Birgitte Munthe. He received a master's degree in philosophy in 1746, after which he used the title Mag. or Magister 'master'. Daae served as the parish priest at Lindås Church from 1759 onward. Daae married Drude Cathrine Haar (1739–1787) when she was 15 years old on June 8, 1754. He had 15 children with her, and several of his children and grandchildren served as priests and officers in Western Norway. Daae was the grandfather of the historian Ludvig Kristensen Daa and the priest Claus Daae, and the great-grandfather of the politician Ludvig Daae, the historian Ludvig Ludvigsen Daae, and Suzannah Daae Thoresen, the wife of Henrik Ibsen. Daae died and was buried on the island of Lygra in Hordaland county.

Daae left an estate that included 23 farms in Sogn and 31 parts of farms in Lindås. He also owned many churches with tithes: churches in the parish of Lindås (Lindås, Myking, Sandnes, and Lygra churches), Arnafjord Church and Hove Church in the parish of Vik, and Hamre Church in Osterøy. The churches and land in the estate amounted to a sales value of over 12,000 rixdollars.

== Descendants ==
Daae had several notable descendants:

- Ludvig Daae (1723–1786)
  - Anders Daae (1758–1816), priest
    - Hans Daae (1808–1865), priest
      - Anders Daae, physician, prison director
      - Iver Munthe Daae, customs officer in China, art collector
  - Johan Christopher Haar Daae, priest
    - Sara Margrethe Daae, wife of the priest and politician Hans Conrad Thoresen
  - Iver Munthe Daae, priest
    - Claus Daae priest, politician
    - Jens Kobro Daae, priest
  - Christen Daae, priest
    - Ludvig Kristensen Daa, history professor
    - Nicoline Friis Daae (born 1820), wife of Jens Kobro Daae
