= Lindås Municipality =

Former municipality in Hordaland, Norway

Lindås Municipality Lindås kommune
- Former municipality
- Lindaas herred (historic name)
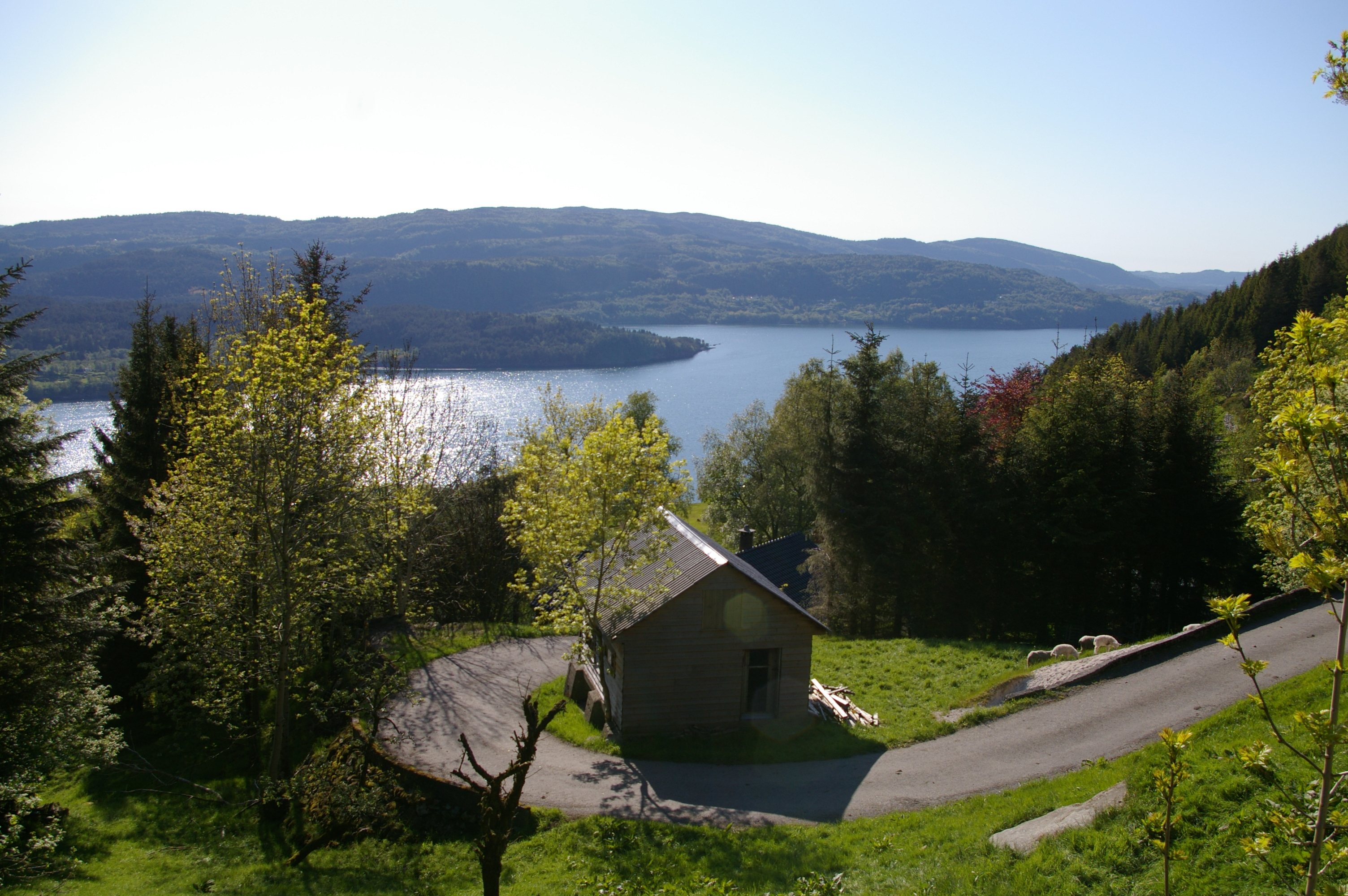
- View of Veland along the Hindnesfjorden

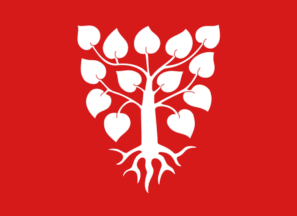
- Flag Coat of arms

- Hordaland within Norway

- Lindås within Hordaland
- Coordinates: 60°37′29″N 05°19′42″E
- Country: Norway
- County: Hordaland
- District: Nordhordland
- Established: 1 Jan 1838
  - Created as: Formannskapsdistrikt
- Disestablished: 1 Jan 2020
  - Succeeded by: Alver Municipality
- Administrative centre: Knarvik

Government
  - Mayor (2007–2019): Astrid Aarhus Byrknes (KrF)

Area (upon dissolution)
  - Total: 474.99 km^{2} (183.39 sq mi)
  - Land: 456.14 km^{2} (176.12 sq mi)
  - Water: 18.85 km^{2} (7.28 sq mi) 4%
  - Rank: #213 in Norway
- Highest elevation: 957 m (3,140 ft)

Population (2019)
  - Total: 15,812
  - Rank: #75 in Norway
  - Density: 33.3/km^{2} (86/sq mi)
  - Change (10 years): ▲ +12.7%
- Demonym: Lindåsing

Official language
  - Norwegian form: Nynorsk
- Time zone: UTC+01:00 (CET)
  - Summer (DST): UTC+02:00 (CEST)
- ISO 3166 code: NO-1263

Lindås is a former municipality in the old Hordaland county, Norway. The 475-square-kilometre (183 sq mi) municipality existed from 1838 until its dissolution in 2020. The area is now part of Alver Municipality in the traditional district of Nordhordland in Vestland county. The administrative centre was the village of Knarvik. Other villages in the municipality included Alversund, Isdalstø, Lindås, Ostereidet, and Seim. The Mongstad industrial area in the extreme northern part of Lindås Municipality had one of the largest oil refineries and largest seaports in Norway. The oil refinery at Mongstad was by far the largest employer in the municipality.

Prior to its dissolution in 2020, the 474.99-square-kilometre (183.39 sq mi) municipality was the 213th largest by area out of the 422 municipalities in Norway. Lindås Municipality was the 75th most populous municipality in Norway with a population of about 15,812. The municipality's population density was 33.3 inhabitants per square kilometre (86/sq mi) and its population had increased by 12.7% over the previous 10-year period.

== General information ==
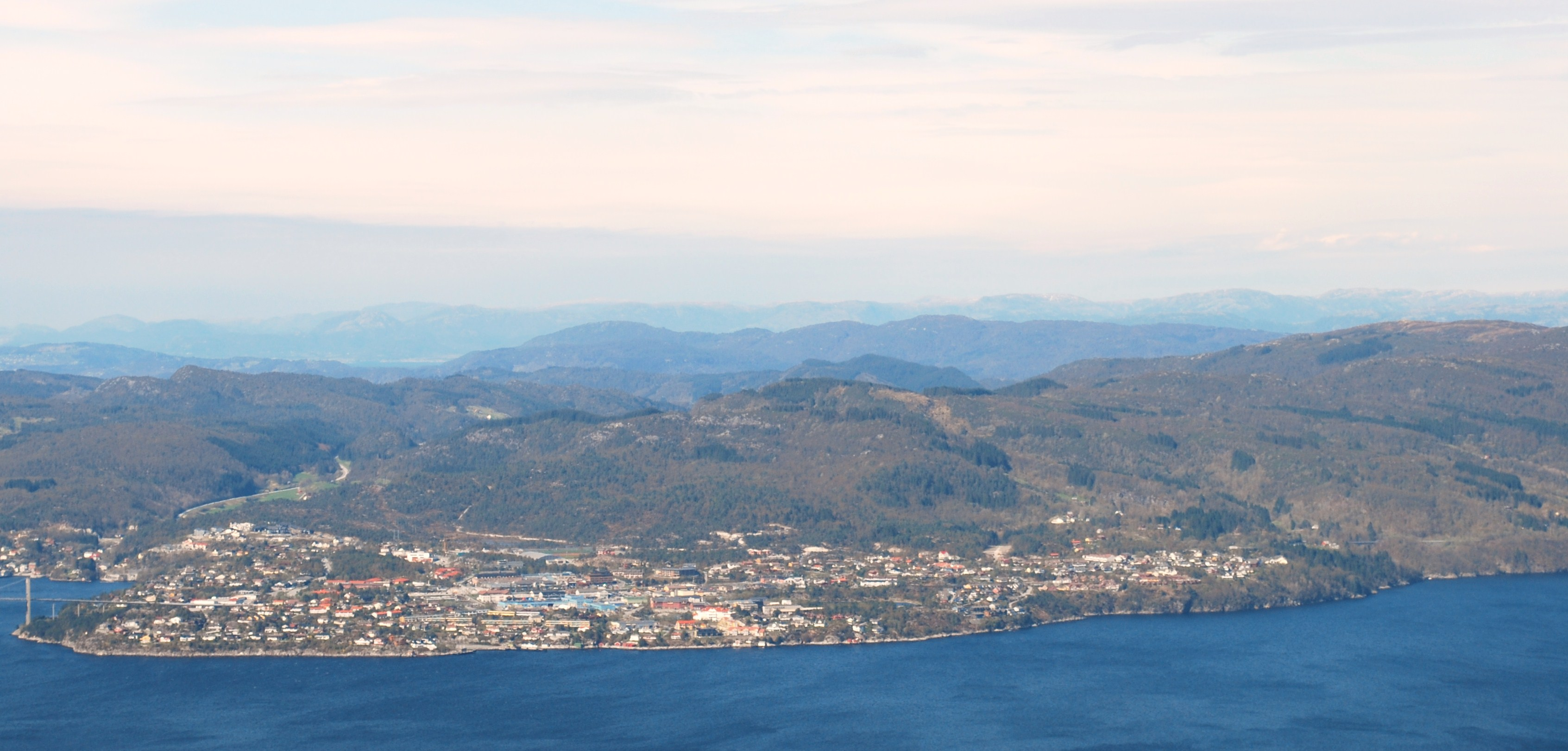
View of Knarvik

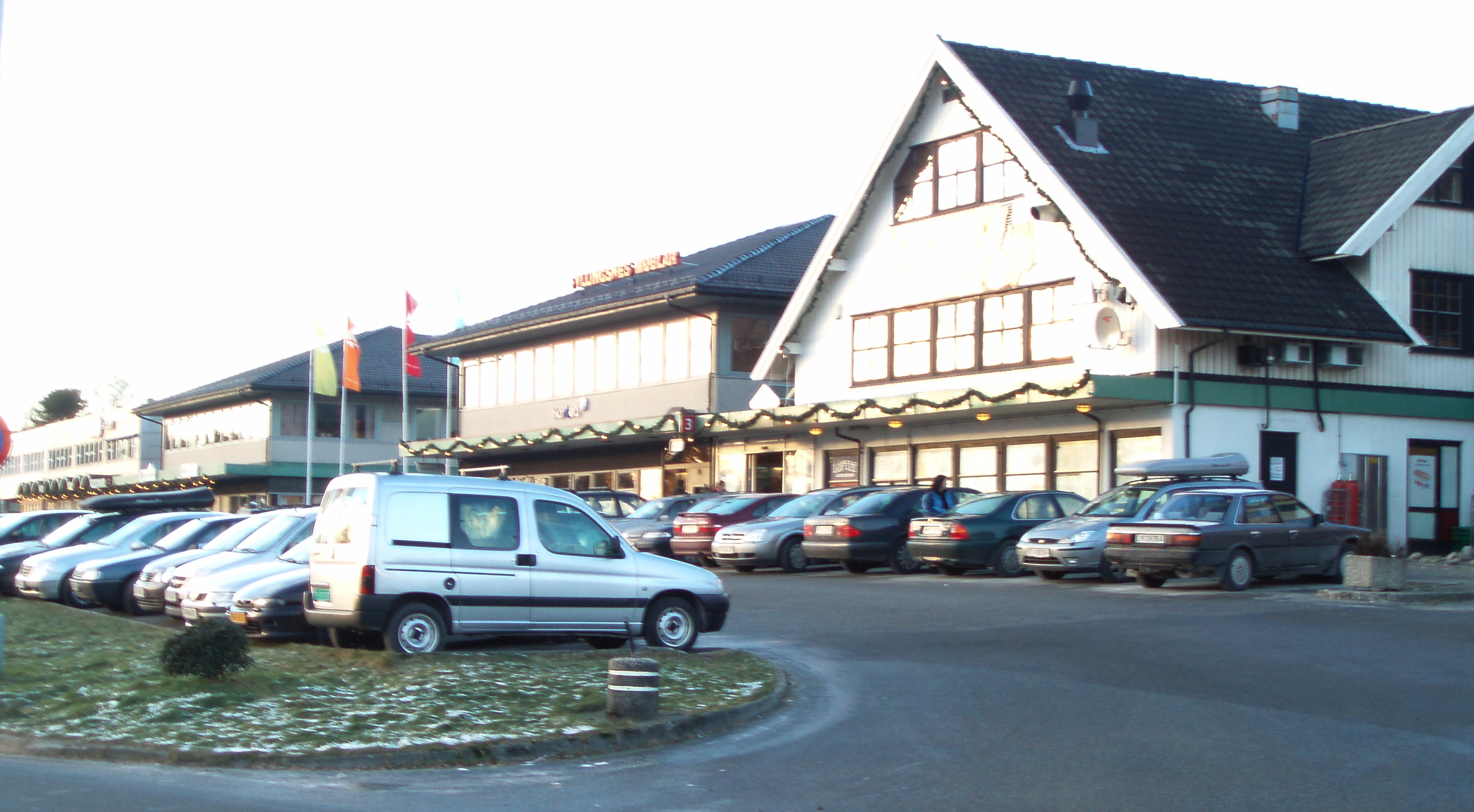
Knarvik Senter, the largest mall in the region

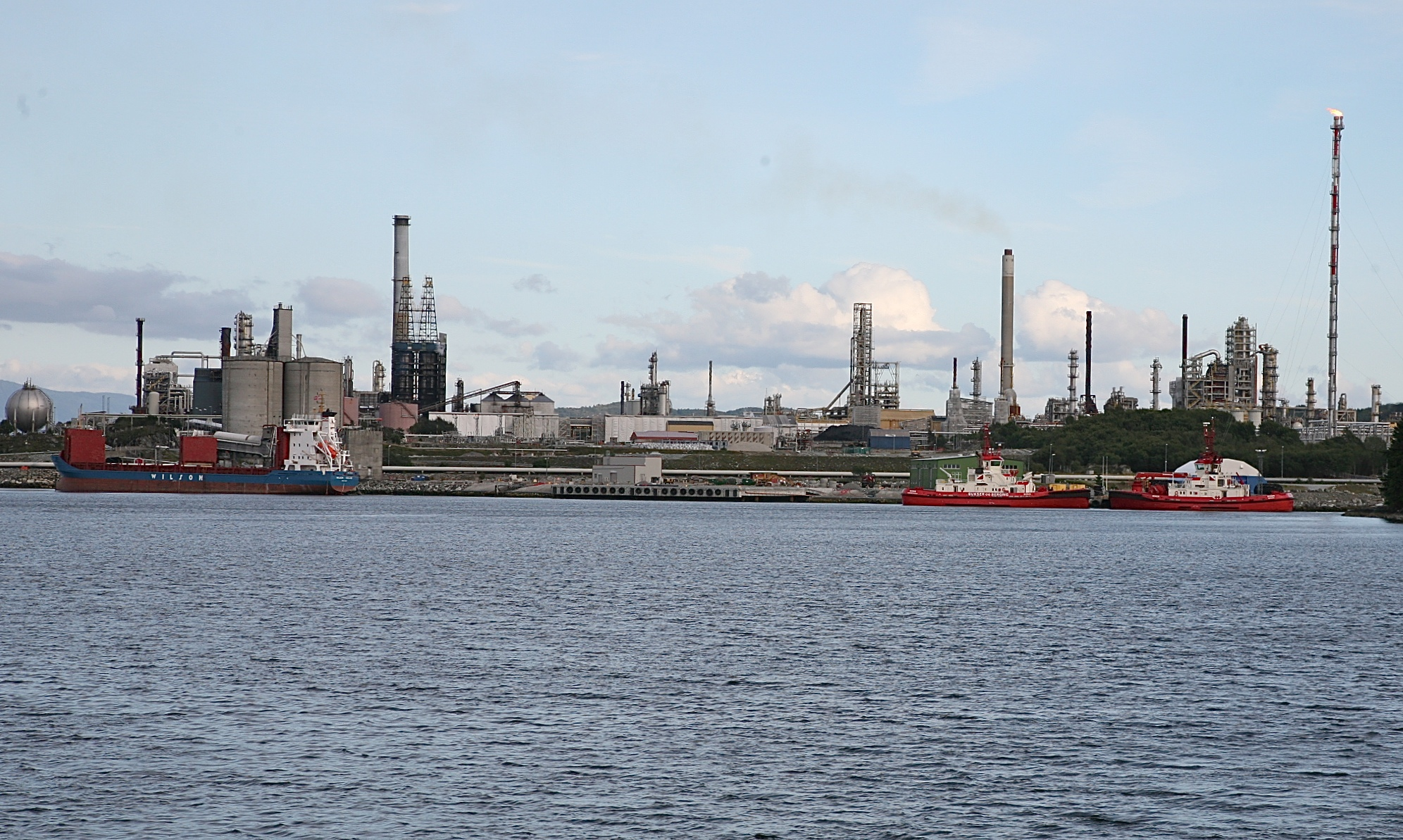
View of the Mongstad industrial area

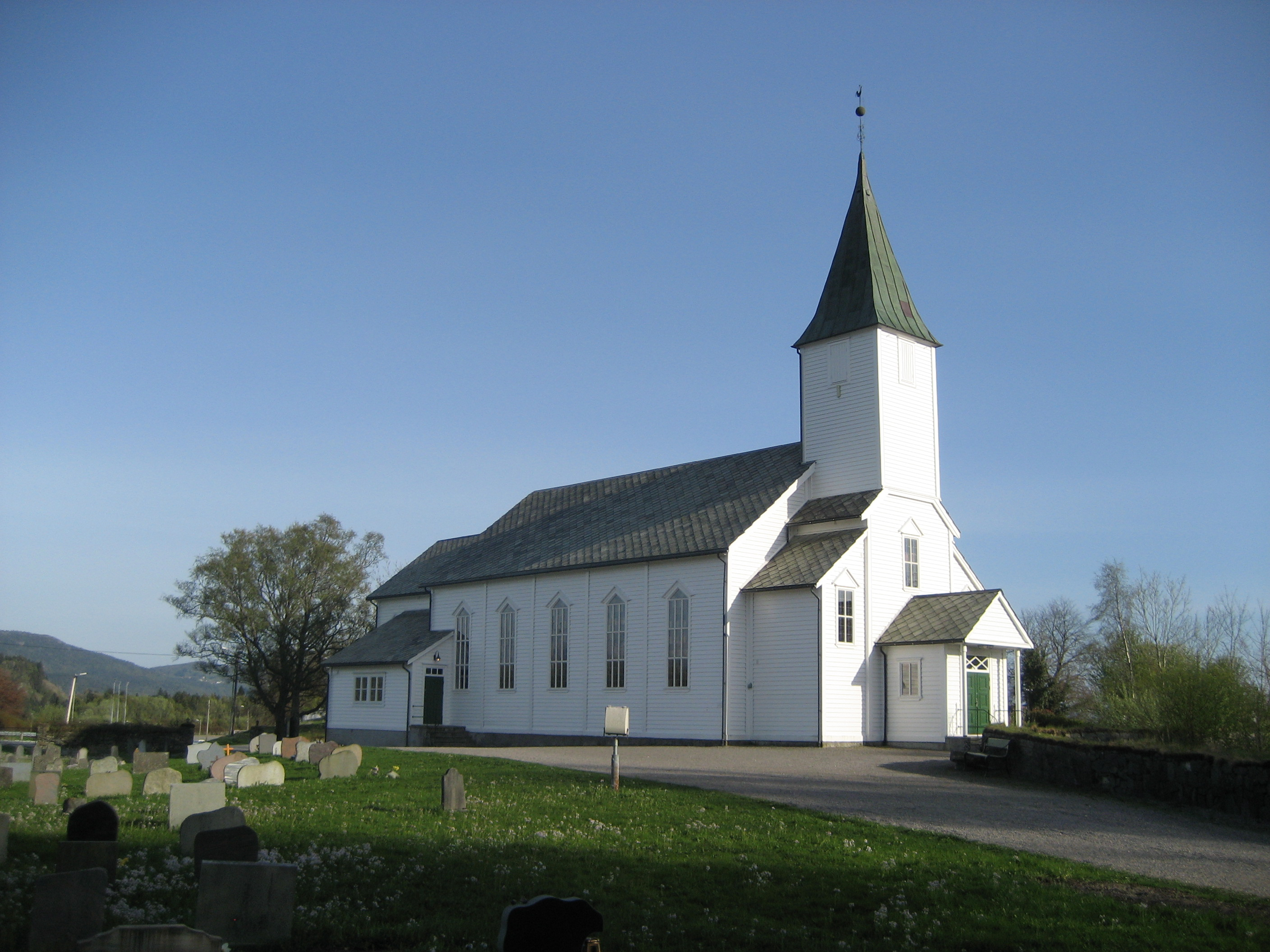
Lindås Church

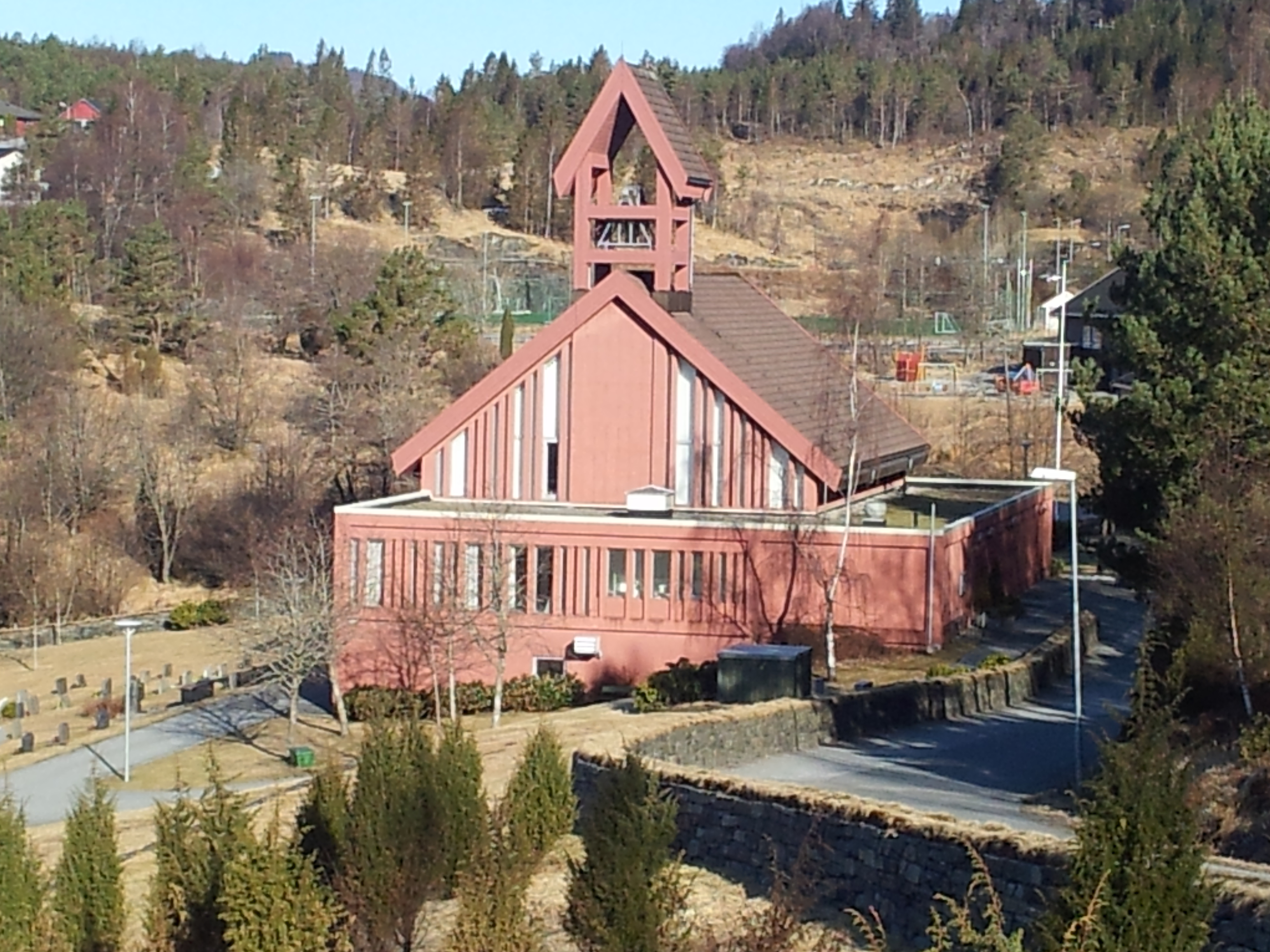
Ostereidet Church

The parish of Lindaas (later spelled Lindås) was established as a municipality on 1 January 1838 (see formannskapsdistrikt law). On 1 March 1879, Lindaas Municipality was divided: the northeastern district (population: 2,336) became the new Masfjorden Municipality and the rest (population: 6,374) remained as a smaller Lindaas Municipality. On 1 January 1910, Lindaas Municipality was divided again: the northwestern island district (population: 2,518) was separated to form the new Austrheim Municipality and the rest remained as a smaller Lindaas Municipality with 4,433 residents.

During the 1960s, there were many municipal mergers across Norway due to the work of the Schei Committee. On 1 January 1964, the following places were merged into one large Lindås Municipality:

- The Nipo, Dyrkelbotn, and Eitrdalen farms (population: 12) in extreme western Modalen Municipality
- All of Hosanger Municipality located north of the Osterfjorden (population: 791)
- All of Hamre Municipality located north of the Osterfjorden (population: 1,240)
- The whole Alversund Municipality (population: 2,099)
- The Titland area (population: 40) from Sæbø Municipality, northwest of the village of Seim
- All of Lindås Municipality (population: 3,651)

Also on this date, there were two other changes. The Sletta area (population: 305) on the island of Radøy was switched from Lindås Municipality to the new Radøy Municipality. The other change was the Einestrand, Eikebotn, and Kikallen areas (population: 25) were transferred from Lindås Municipality to Masfjorden Municipality.

On 1 January 2020, the neighboring Meland Municipality, Radøy Municipality, and Lindås Municipality were merged to form the new Alver Municipality. Historically, this municipality was part of the old Hordaland county. On 1 January 2020, the new Alver Municipality became a part of the newly-formed Vestland county (after Hordaland and Sogn og Fjordane counties were merged).

=== Name ===
The municipality (originally the parish) is named after the old Lindås farm (Old Norse: Lindiáss) since the first Lindås Church was built there. The first element is lindi which means "linden (Tilia) wood" or "place overgrown with linden". The last element is áss which means "mountain ridge" or "rocky ridge". On 21 December 1917, a royal resolution enacted the 1917 Norwegian language reforms. Prior to this change, the name was spelled Lindaas with the digraph "Aa", and after this reform, the name was spelled Lindås, using the letter Å instead.

=== Coat of arms ===
The coat of arms was granted on 4 May 1979 and it was in use until 1 January 2020 when the municipality was dissolved. The blazon is "Gules, a linden tree eradicated argent" (Norwegian: På raud grunn eit kvitt lindetre). This means the arms have a red field (background) and the charge is a leaf-covered linden tree (Tilia × europaea) with its bare roots showing. The charge has a tincture of argent which means it is commonly colored white, but if it is made out of metal, then silver is used. The design is a canting arms since the name of the municipality refers to a linden tree. The arms were designed by Magnus Hardeland. The municipal flag has the same design as the coat of arms.

=== Churches ===
The Church of Norway had eight parishes (sokn) within Lindås Municipality. It is part of the Nordhordland prosti (deanery) in the Diocese of Bjørgvin.

Churches in Lindås Municipality
Parish (sokn)	Church name	Location of the church	Year built
Alversund	Alversund Church	Alversund	1879
Alversund	Knarvik Church	Knarvik	2014
Hundvin	Hundvin Church	Hundvin	1936
Lindås	Lindås Church	Lindås	1865
Lygra	Lygra Church	Luro	1892
Myking	Myking Church	Myking	1861
Ostereidet	Ostereidet Church	Ostereidet	1988
Seim	Seim Church	Seim	1878
Vike	Vike Church	Vikanes	1891

== Government ==
While it existed, Lindås Municipality was responsible for primary education (through 10th grade), outpatient health services, senior citizen services, welfare and other social services, zoning, economic development, and municipal roads and utilities. The municipality was governed by a municipal council of directly elected representatives. The mayor was indirectly elected by a vote of the municipal council. The municipality was under the jurisdiction of the Bergen District Court and the Gulating Court of Appeal.

=== Municipal council ===
The municipal council (Kommunestyre) of Lindås Municipality was made up of representatives that were elected to four year terms. The tables below show the historical composition of the council by political party.

Lindås kommunestyre 2015–2019
Party name (in Nynorsk)	Number of representatives
Labour Party (Arbeidarpartiet)	6
Progress Party (Framstegspartiet)	5
Conservative Party (Høgre)	4
Christian Democratic Party (Kristeleg Folkeparti)	9
Centre Party (Senterpartiet)	4
Socialist Left Party (Sosialistisk Venstreparti)	1
Liberal Party (Venstre)	1
Total number of members:	31
Note: On 1 January 2020, Lindås Municipality became part of Alver Municipality.

Lindås kommunestyre 2011–2015
Party name (in Nynorsk)	Number of representatives
Labour Party (Arbeidarpartiet)	6
Progress Party (Framstegspartiet)	5
Conservative Party (Høgre)	7
Christian Democratic Party (Kristeleg Folkeparti)	8
Centre Party (Senterpartiet)	3
Liberal Party (Venstre)	2
Total number of members:	31

Lindås kommunestyre 2007–2011
Party name (in Nynorsk)	Number of representatives
Labour Party (Arbeidarpartiet)	6
Progress Party (Framstegspartiet)	9
Conservative Party (Høgre)	5
Christian Democratic Party (Kristeleg Folkeparti)	4
Centre Party (Senterpartiet)	5
Socialist Left Party (Sosialistisk Venstreparti)	1
Liberal Party (Venstre)	1
Total number of members:	31

Lindås kommunestyre 2003–2007
Party name (in Nynorsk)	Number of representatives
Labour Party (Arbeidarpartiet)	7
Progress Party (Framstegspartiet)	7
Conservative Party (Høgre)	4
Christian Democratic Party (Kristeleg Folkeparti)	5
Centre Party (Senterpartiet)	5
Socialist Left Party (Sosialistisk Venstreparti)	2
Liberal Party (Venstre)	1
Total number of members:	31

Lindås kommunestyre 1999–2003
Party name (in Nynorsk)	Number of representatives
Labour Party (Arbeidarpartiet)	8
Progress Party (Framstegspartiet)	6
Conservative Party (Høgre)	7
Christian Democratic Party (Kristeleg Folkeparti)	9
Centre Party (Senterpartiet)	6
Socialist Left Party (Sosialistisk Venstreparti)	3
Liberal Party (Venstre)	2
Total number of members:	41

Lindås kommunestyre 1995–1999
Party name (in Nynorsk)	Number of representatives
Labour Party (Arbeidarpartiet)	8
Progress Party (Framstegspartiet)	4
Conservative Party (Høgre)	6
Christian Democratic Party (Kristeleg Folkeparti)	7
Centre Party (Senterpartiet)	11
Socialist Left Party (Sosialistisk Venstreparti)	2
Liberal Party (Venstre)	3
Total number of members:	41

Lindås kommunestyre 1991–1995
Party name (in Nynorsk)	Number of representatives
Labour Party (Arbeidarpartiet)	6
Progress Party (Framstegspartiet)	3
Conservative Party (Høgre)	7
Christian Democratic Party (Kristeleg Folkeparti)	9
Centre Party (Senterpartiet)	10
Socialist Left Party (Sosialistisk Venstreparti)	4
Liberal Party (Venstre)	2
Total number of members:	41

Lindås kommunestyre 1987–1991
Party name (in Nynorsk)	Number of representatives
Labour Party (Arbeidarpartiet)	9
Progress Party (Framstegspartiet)	4
Conservative Party (Høgre)	9
Christian Democratic Party (Kristeleg Folkeparti)	8
Centre Party (Senterpartiet)	7
Socialist Left Party (Sosialistisk Venstreparti)	1
Liberal Party (Venstre)	3
Total number of members:	41

Lindås kommunestyre 1983–1987
Party name (in Nynorsk)	Number of representatives
Labour Party (Arbeidarpartiet)	9
Progress Party (Framstegspartiet)	2
Conservative Party (Høgre)	9
Christian Democratic Party (Kristeleg Folkeparti)	10
Centre Party (Senterpartiet)	7
Socialist Left Party (Sosialistisk Venstreparti)	1
Liberal Party (Venstre)	3
Total number of members:	41

Lindås kommunestyre 1979–1983
Party name (in Nynorsk)	Number of representatives
Labour Party (Arbeidarpartiet)	8
Conservative Party (Høgre)	11
Christian Democratic Party (Kristeleg Folkeparti)	9
New People's Party (Nye Folkepartiet)	1
Centre Party (Senterpartiet)	8
Liberal Party (Venstre)	4
Total number of members:	41

Lindås kommunestyre 1975–1979
Party name (in Nynorsk)	Number of representatives
Labour Party (Arbeidarpartiet)	8
Conservative Party (Høgre)	7
Christian Democratic Party (Kristeleg Folkeparti)	12
Centre Party (Senterpartiet)	12
Liberal Party (Venstre)	2
Total number of members:	41

Lindås kommunestyre 1971–1975
Party name (in Nynorsk)	Number of representatives
Labour Party (Arbeidarpartiet)	8
Conservative Party (Høgre)	3
Christian Democratic Party (Kristeleg Folkeparti)	10
Centre Party (Senterpartiet)	10
Liberal Party (Venstre)	8
Local List(s) (Lokale lister)	2
Total number of members:	41

Lindås kommunestyre 1967–1971
Party name (in Nynorsk)	Number of representatives
Labour Party (Arbeidarpartiet)	8
Conservative Party (Høgre)	3
Christian Democratic Party (Kristeleg Folkeparti)	11
Centre Party (Senterpartiet)	9
Liberal Party (Venstre)	10
Total number of members:	41

Lindås kommunestyre 1963–1967
Party name (in Nynorsk)	Number of representatives
Labour Party (Arbeidarpartiet)	8
Conservative Party (Høgre)	2
Christian Democratic Party (Kristeleg Folkeparti)	10
Centre Party (Senterpartiet)	11
Liberal Party (Venstre)	10
Total number of members:	41

Lindås heradsstyre 1959–1963
Party name (in Nynorsk)	Number of representatives
Local List(s) (Lokale lister)	25
Total number of members:	25

Lindås heradsstyre 1955–1959
Party name (in Nynorsk)	Number of representatives
Local List(s) (Lokale lister)	25
Total number of members:	25

Lindås heradsstyre 1951–1955
Party name (in Nynorsk)	Number of representatives
Local List(s) (Lokale lister)	24
Total number of members:	24

Lindås heradsstyre 1947–1951
Party name (in Nynorsk)	Number of representatives
Local List(s) (Lokale lister)	24
Total number of members:	24

Lindås heradsstyre 1945–1947
Party name (in Nynorsk)	Number of representatives
List of workers, fishermen, and small farmholders (Arbeidarar, fiskarar, småbrukarar liste)	1
Local List(s) (Lokale lister)	23
Total number of members:	24

Lindås heradsstyre 1937–1941*
Party name (in Nynorsk)	Number of representatives
Labour Party (Arbeidarpartiet)	2
Joint List(s) of Non-Socialist Parties (Borgarlege Felleslister)	5
Local List(s) (Lokale lister)	17
Total number of members:	24
Note: Due to the German occupation of Norway during World War II, no elections were held for new municipal councils until after the war ended in 1945.

=== Mayors ===
The mayor (Nynorsk: ordførar) of Lindås Municipality was the political leader of the municipality and the chairperson of the municipal council. The following people held this position:

- 1838–1843: Niels Landmark
- 1844–1847: Peter Andreas Jensen
- 1848–1871: Erik Riisnæs
- 1872–1875: Ananias Skauge
- 1876–1877: Erik Riisnæs
- 1878–1883: Thomas Collett (H)
- 1884–1891: Martinus Hodneland (H)
- 1892–1895: Martinus Onæs (MV)
- 1896–1904: Andreas Haraldsen (V)
- 1905–1907: Jakob Vabø (V)
- 1908–1912: Lauritz Havnsund (FV)
- 1912–1917: Baste Fanebust (V)
- 1917–1919: Mons Takle
- 1919–1923: Nils Hundvin
- 1923–1937: Lars Kolås (Bp)
- 1938–1942: Ludvig Hodne (Ap)
- 1942–1942: Jacob Bakke (NS)
- 1942–1944: Asgeir Fjellanger (NS)
- 1945–1945: Eilif Stene (NS)
- 1945–1951: Ludvig Hodne (Ap)
- 1952–1963: Lars Amandus Aasgard (KrF)
- 1964–1967: Nils Herland (Sp)
- 1968–1969: Sverre Helland (Sp)
- 1970–1975: Olav J. Grov (V)
- 1975–1983: Åsmund Skår (KrF)
- 1983–1991: Jostein Vike (Sp)
- 1991–1995: Arnvald Risøy (KrF)
- 1995–1999: Atle Kålås(H)
- 1999–2003: Odd Tøsdal (Ap)
- 2003–2007: Tove Linnea Brandvik (Ap)
- 2007–2019: Astrid Aarhus Byrknes (KrF)

== History ==
Ancient settlements of Vikings are found in several places. At Lindås there are stories of monks coming from England and living with the Viking population.

Håkonshaugen (from the Old Norse word haugr meaning mound) at the village of Seim is the burial mound of King Haakon the Good, the third king of Norway. King Haakon was mortally wounded in 961 at the Battle of Fitjar at nearby Stord. Håkonshaugen is the millennium site in the municipality of Lindås.

The historical play Håkonarspelet ("King with the golden helmet") is performed here every year. The play is one of several plays written by author Johannes Heggland. The play was written in five parts between 1995 and 1996. It centers on events in the life of King Haakon the Good and the king's only daughter, Thora.

== Population ==
Historical population

Year	Pop.	±% p.a.
1865	7,103	—
1875	7,847	+1.00%
1900	6,812	−0.56%
1910	4,583	−3.89%
1920	4,294	−0.65%

Year	Pop.	±% p.a.
1930	4,157	−0.32%
1946	4,216	+0.09%
1951	4,121	−0.45%
1960	4,084	−0.10%
1970	7,776	+6.65%

Year	Pop.	±% p.a.
1980	10,099	+2.65%
1990	11,861	+1.62%
2000	12,492	+0.52%
2010	14,286	+1.35%
2019	15,812	+1.13%

Note: The municipal borders were changed in 1879, 1910, and 1964, causing a significant change in the population.
Source: Statistics Norway and Norwegian Historical Data Centre

== Geography ==
Lindås Municipality was located mostly on the mainland of the Nordhordland region, just north of the city of Bergen. The municipality was north of the Osterfjorden and Romarheimsfjorden. The Lindås peninsula heads north from there. The peninsula juts out west of the Austfjorden, south of the Fensfjorden, and east of the Radfjorden. The municipality included the very southernmost tip of the neighboring island of Radøy as well as the island of Lygra. The Lurefjorden cuts into the middle of the peninsula. On the east side of the municipality was a mountainous area that was sparsely populated. The highest point in the municipality was the 957-metre (3,140 ft) tall mountain Sørdalsnuten, located just west of the border with Modalen Municipality.

The municipality was surrounded by water on three sides, and the fourth side is mountainous, so there were few road connections to Lindås. On the east side, the municipality was accessible by the Eikefet Tunnel, part of the European route E39 highway. On the southwest side, the Hagelsund Bridge crossed the fjord to connect to Bergen Municipality and Meland Municipality to the southwest. The Alversund Bridge on the west side connected Lindås to the islands of Radøy Municipality. Austrheim Municipality was to the north, and it included a small part of the mainland Lindås peninsula, so there was road access there too.

== Attractions ==
=== Lindås Church ===
Lindås Church (Lindås kirke) was consecrated 20 September 1865. The church was built just west of where the old stone church stood. The architect was Ole Syslak who was responsible for the construction of several other churches in western Norway. The church received its first church organ in 1906, which was replaced in 1978 with an organ built by Josef Hilmar Jørgensen. The church has two church bells. The oldest clock was made by Laxevaag Værk in Bergen in 1865, while the other was made by O. Olsen & Son in Tønsberg in 1955.

The first time a church in Lindås mentioned was in 1315. This was a stone altar, which stood under the open sky. Walls were erected later, so that the priest was standing under a roof, while the audience stood on the ground outside and listened. Later walls were raised so that the church was under roof. This church was extended in 1600 and repaired in the 1700s.

=== Heathland Centre at Lygra ===
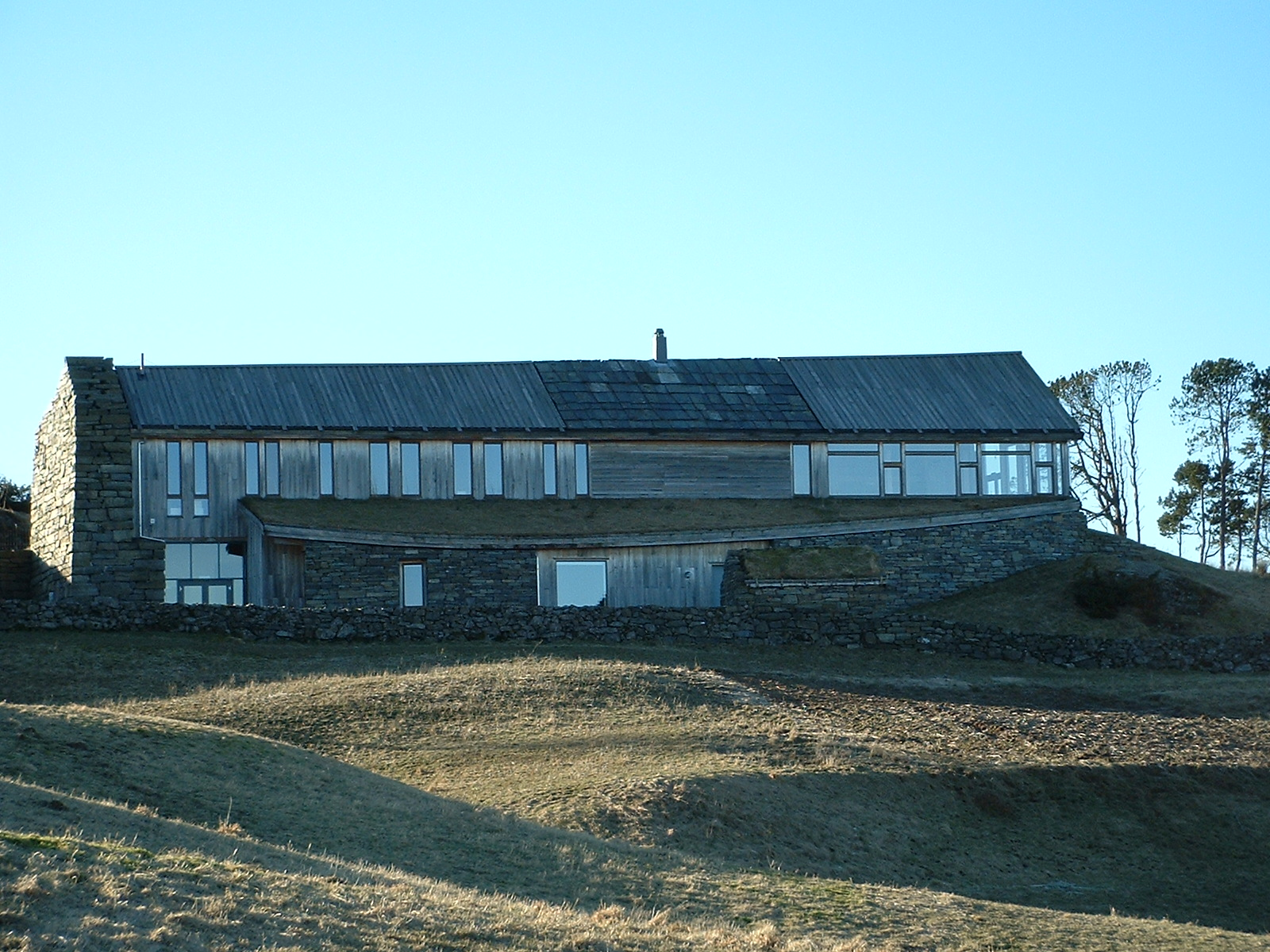
Lyngheisenteret

Heathland Centre at Lygra (Lyngheisenteret på Lygra) is a cultural museum consisting of a conserved heather moorland. It is also an information centre for the coastal heathlands. The center was established in the 1970s. An information center with a restaurant, auditorium, and permanent exhibition was opened in 2000. Heathland was founded by the University of Bergen, Vestland county, Lindås Municipality, the Regional Council in Nordhordland, and Gulen Municipality. It is administrated by the Museum Centre in Hordaland.

== See also ==
- List of former municipalities of Norway
