= Seim, Vestland =

Village in Alver Municipality, Norway

Seim
- Village
- Interactive map of Seim
- Coordinates: 60.62061°N 5.26961°E
- Country: Norway
- Region: Western Norway
- County: Vestland
- District: Nordhordland
- Municipality: Alver Municipality

Area
  - Total: 0.37 km^{2} (0.14 sq mi)
- Elevation: 26 m (85 ft)

Population (2025)
  - Total: 463
  - Density: 1,251/km^{2} (3,240/sq mi)
- Time zone: UTC+01:00 (CET)
  - Summer (DST): UTC+02:00 (CEST)
- Post Code: 5912 Seim

Seim is a village in Alver Municipality in Vestland county, Norway. The village is located at the innermost part of the Lurefjorden, about 10 kilometres (6.2 mi) north of the village of Knarvik and about 12 kilometres (7.5 mi) southeast of the island of Lygra. The village is home to Seim Church (Seim kyrkje) which was built in 1878, and a primary school.

The 0.37-square-kilometre (91-acre) village has a population (2025) of 463 which gives the village a population density of 1,251 inhabitants per square kilometre (3,240/sq mi).

== History ==
Harald Fairhair had his royal estates in and around the village of Seim. According to tradition, his son King Håkon the Good is buried at Håkonhaugen in Seim (Håkonshaugen på Seim). Since 1997, Seim has been a sight of the Håkonarspelet summer festivals which includes performances of the historical drama Kongen med Gullhjelmen. Written by Johannes Heggland, this series of historic plays centers on the reign of King Håkon the Good which ended with the Battle of Fitjar.

The village of Seim and the surrounding areas going out about 2 to 4 kilometres (1.2 to 2.5 mi) around the village in all directions is the area of the old parish of Seim. This area historically belonged to the prestegjeld of Hosanger. Seim was an exclave of Hosanger, since the rest of Hosanger was located further to the south and east and the prestegjeld of Lindås separated the two. In 1885, Seim was transferred to the new Alversund Municipality. In 1964, Alversund Municipality was merged with parts of several other municipalities to form a new, larger Lindås Municipality. Then in 2020, the area was incorporated into the new Alver Municipality.
