= Astrid Aarhus Byrknes =

Norwegian politician

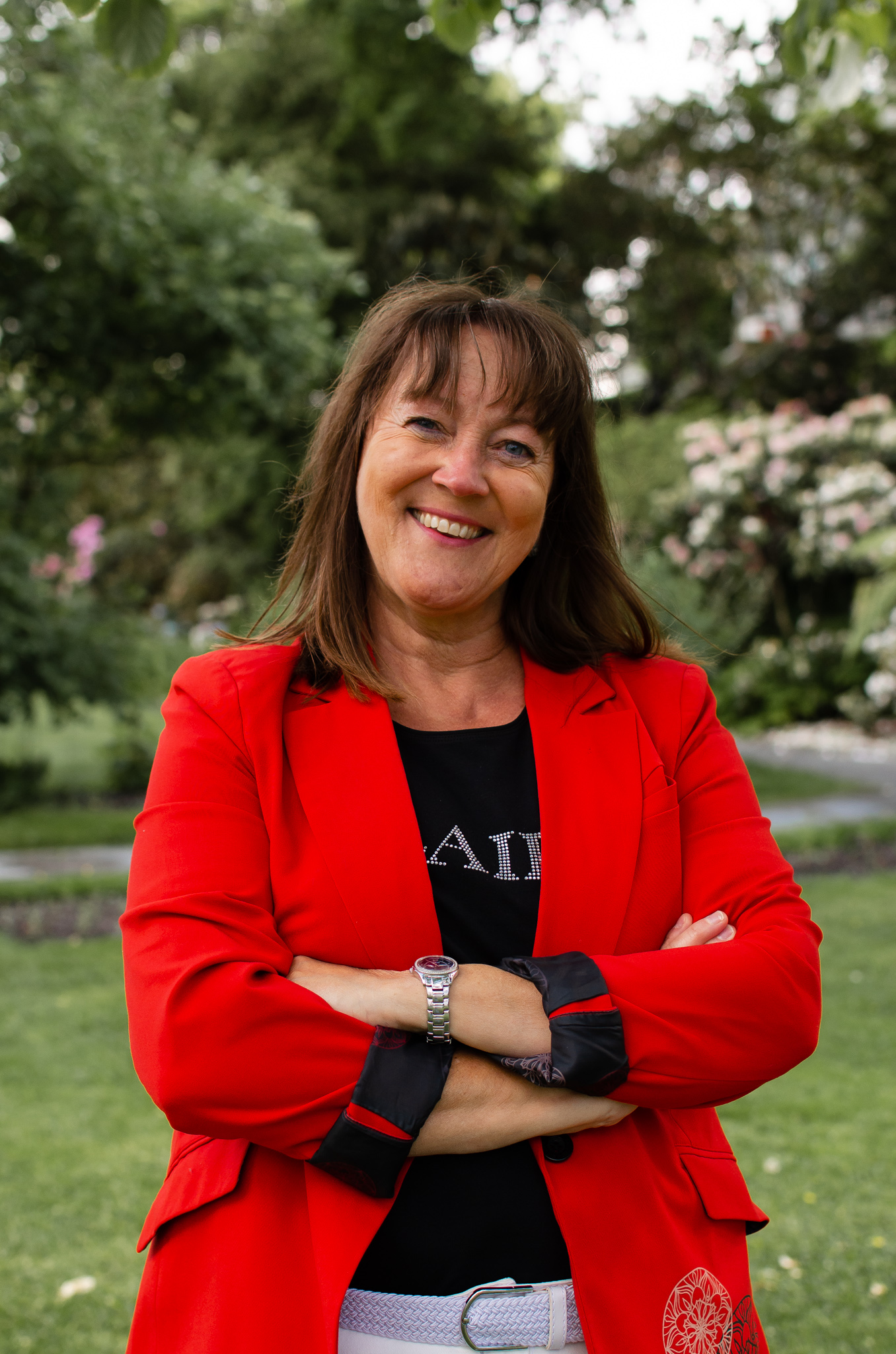

Astrid Aarhus Byrknes (born 9 April 1963) is a Norwegian politician for the Christian Democratic Party.

In 2007 she became mayor of Lindås Municipality, succeeding Tove Linnea Brandvik.

She served as a deputy representative to the Parliament of Norway from Hordaland during the terms 2009–2013 and 2013–2017.
