= Anders Daae (priest) =

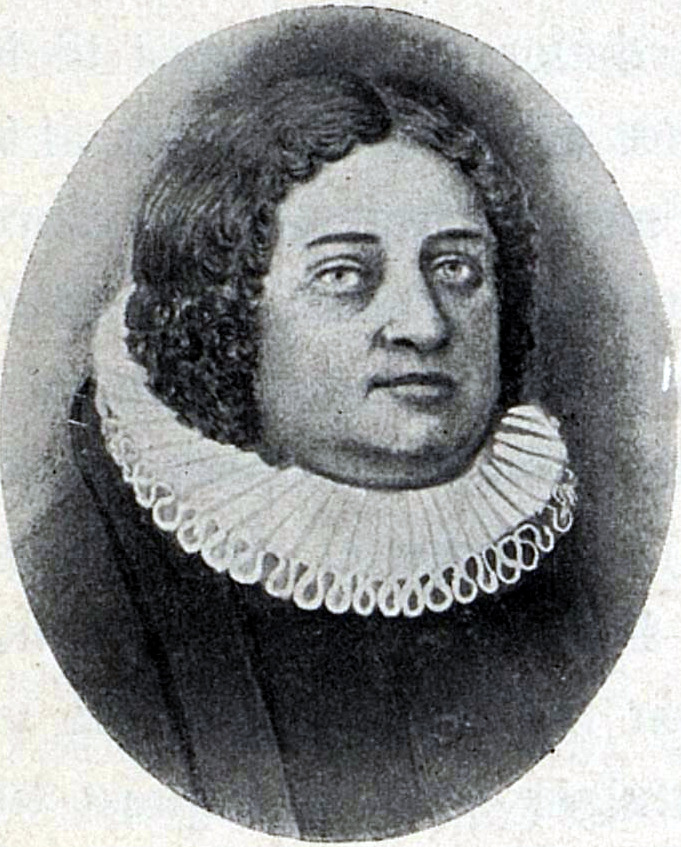
- Born: December 20, 1680; Trondheim
- Died: May 18, 1763 (aged 82); Vik
- Occupation: Priest

Anders Daae (December 20, 1680 – May 18, 1763) was a Norwegian priest and landowner.

== Life ==
Daae was born in Trondheim, the son of Jonas Edvardsen (a.k.a. Jon Effuertsen, died 1683 or 1688), a townsman of Trondheim. Jonas Edvardsen did not use the surname Daae. After Jonas Edvardsen died, Simon Hoff, the chancellor of the cathedral school in Trondheim, served as Daae's guardian. The origin of Daae, the surname he adopted, is unknown or uncertain. Daae's mother was Kiersten Jensdatter (died 1683). Anders Daae is believed to have started using the surname Daae after he was admitted to the University of Copenhagen. Daae was indigent when he graduated. In Copenhagen he lived in Regentzen, a building for poor students. After he took his theology exam, he spent two years as a private tutor for a bailiff in Nordmøre, and then he traveled back to Copenhagen in 1705 with the hope of receiving a clerical position.

Daae served as a provost and the parish priest at Vik in Sogn from 1708 onward, holding the position for nearly 55 years. Daae served under seven different bishops of Bergen. Bishop Erik Pontoppidan was not particularly pleased with Daae. He is said to have received his clerical position in Vik by visiting the royal castle in Copenhagen and with the assistance of Princess Sophia Hedwig. According to Lampe, Daae accumulated a fortune of 40,000 rixdollars. He owned churches along with land and tithes, as well as several other properties in both Outer and Inner Sogn. Daae married Birgitte Ludvigsdatter Munhte (1686–1770) in 1709. It was probably Birgitte that initially expanded the couple's wealth. Bishop Erik Pontoppidan carried out a visitation in 1749 and noted that Daae had accumulated much land and was considered the richest priest in the diocese. He owned both of the churches in Vik and the church in Lærdal, and he also received payment for renting land that was owned by the church or that he himself owned. In the diocese, Anders and Birgitte's sons inherited property worth 6,000 rixdollars each, and their daughters 3,000 rixdollars each.

Daae is said to have been a strict priest that often reproached people for their sins. He is also believed to have been caught up by the Pietism movement, which had started in Germany. Daae established a school for commoners in 1741, and there are many local oral traditions concerning Daae as a priest in Vik. Daae died in Vik.

== Extended family ==
His wife Birgitte was the daughter of Ludvig Christophersen Munthe (1657–1708), the previous priest in Vik, and via her great-grandfather Ludvig Munthe she was also a second cousin of Ludvig Holberg. Birgitte's mother was Karen Leganger (daughter of the priest Iver Leganger), and she lived with her maternal grandmother Anna Finde (Leganger's widow). For a while, he had two of his sons at the same time as "personal curates" in Vik. Several of Birgitte's brothers were priests. Her sister Anna Ludvigsdatter Munthe was married to Anders Daae's curate Jens Garman. Her sister Helene was also married to a priest.

== Descendants ==
Anders Daae and Birgitte Munthe had eleven children (or which seven reached adulthood), giving rise to one of the largest family of civil servants in Western Norway. Around 1800 there were six parish priests from the Daae family in Sogn. By the 20th century, Anders Daae and Birgitte Munthe's descendants included at least 25 priests and many wives of priests. The surname Daae was used by Anders and Birgitte's descendants.

- Anders Daae and Birgitte Ludvigsdatter née Munthe
  - Jonas Daae (1717–1777), parish priest in Vik (after his father)
  - Karen Cahtrine Daae (1718–1796), wife of Major Frederik Wilhelm Tuchsen
  - Christine Daae (1719–1782), wife of her father's curate Hans J. Grøn
  - Ludvig Daae (1723–1786), priest in Lindås and landowner
    - Anders Daae (1758–1816), priest
    - Johan Christopher Haar Daae (1759–1827), priest
    - Ove Christian Leyrdahl Daae (1767–1840), priest
    - Iver Munthe Daae (1771–1849), priest
    - Ludvig Daae (1774–1843), priest
    - Christen Daae (1776–1854), priest
  - Gert (Gerhard) Daae (1728–1784) parish priest in Luster
