= Hundvin Church =

Church in Vestland, Norway

- Hundvin kyrkje
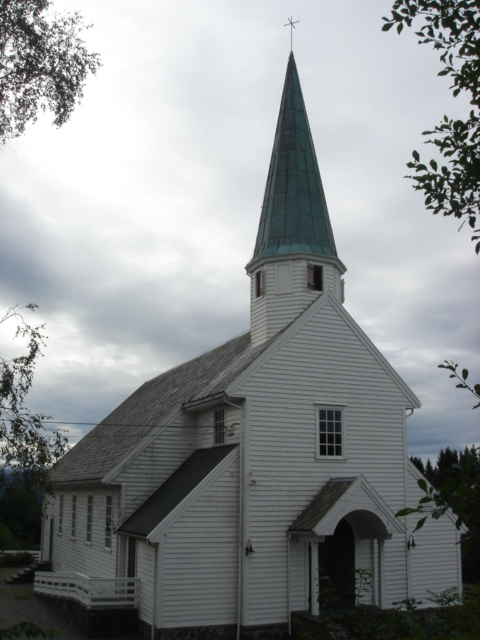
- View of the church
- Hundvin Church
- 60°40′31″N 5°12′57″E
- Location: Alver Municipality, Vestland
- Country: Norway
- Denomination: Church of Norway
- Churchmanship: Evangelical Lutheran

History
- Status: Parish church
- Founded: 1936
- Consecrated: 9 December 1936

Architecture
- Functional status: Active
- Architect: National Architecture Agency
- Architectural type: Long church
- Completed: 1936 (90 years ago)

Specifications
- Capacity: 290
- Materials: Wood

Administration
- Diocese: Bjørgvin bispedømme
- Deanery: Nordhordland prosti
- Parish: Lindås
- Norwegian Cultural Heritage Site
- Type: Church
- Status: Not protected
- ID: 84658

Hundvin Church (Norwegian: Hundvin kyrkje) is a parish church of the Church of Norway in Alver Municipality in Vestland county, Norway. It is located in the village of Hundvin, along the shore of the Lurefjorden. It is one of the three churches for the Lindås parish which is part of the Nordhordland prosti (deanery) in the Diocese of Bjørgvin. The white, wooden church was built in a long church design in 1936 using plans drawn up by the National Architecture Agency. The church seats about 290 people.

== History ==
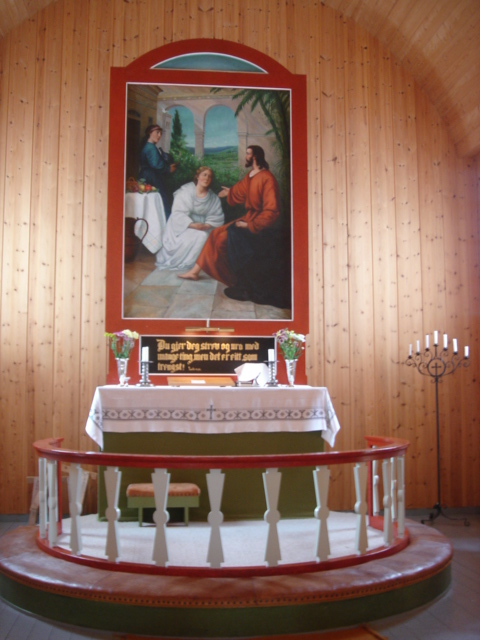
View of the altar

Historically, the people living on the east side of the Lurefjorden had to cross the fjord to get to the Lygra Church. In 1884, a cemetery was built at Hundvin so that parishioners could be buried closer to their homes, without having to transport a body across the fjord by boat. Soon after, the people began asking for a chapel to be built by the cemetery. It wasn't until the mid-1930s that the parish was ready to build the church. The new building was designed by the National Architecture Agency. The church was consecrated on 9 December 1936 by the Bishop Andreas Fleischer. Originally, it was an annex chapel within the Lindås Church parish. In 1990, a bathroom and storage area was built to the north and south sides of the church porch. In 1998, the chapel was upgraded to parish church status.

== See also ==
- List of churches in Bjørgvin
