= Hundvin =

Village in Alver Municipality, Norway

Hundvin Hundven
- Village
- Interactive map of Hundvin
- Coordinates: 60.67612°N 5.21792°E
- Country: Norway
- Region: Western Norway
- County: Vestland
- District: Nordhordland
- Municipality: Alver Municipality
- Elevation: 50 m (160 ft)
- Time zone: UTC+01:00 (CET)
  - Summer (DST): UTC+02:00 (CEST)
- Post Code: 5956 Hundvin

Hundvin is a village in Alver Municipality in Vestland county, Norway. The village is located along the Lurefjorden, about 10 kilometres (6.2 mi) southeast of the village of Lindås and about 5 kilometres (3.1 mi) southeast of the island of Lygra. It is also about 25,5 kilometers from the westmost point in Norway. The village is the site of Hundvin Church.
