= Johan Christopher Haar Daae =

Johan Christopher Haar Daae (August 2, 1759 – September 10, 1827) was a Norwegian priest and politician.

Daae was born in the parish of Lindaas as the son of the priest and landowner Ludvig Daae (1723–1786) and Drude Catrine Daae. He received his theology degree in 1781. Daae initially worked for the geographical land survey in Jutland for four years before he was appointed a curate in Lindås, where his father served. Daae was the parish priest at Norddal Church from 1804 to 1820, and then in Veøy Church, where he succeeded Jens Stub. Daae was married to Susanne Grythen (1760–1808).

Together with the churchwarden Ole A. Dahle, Daae was selected to represent the parish of Norddal (including Sunnylven and Geiranger) at the meeting on 25 March 1814, where representatives from Romsdal county were chosen for the Norwegian Constituent Assembly. Daae died in Veøya.

== Descendants ==
Daae had several notable descendants:

- Johan Christopher Haar Daae
  - Ludvig Daae (1792–1879), officer, purchased the Solnør farm in Skodje
    - Margrethe Giørwel Daae (1825–1887), wife of Peter Gustav Zwilgmeyer
    - Ludvig Daae, jurist, landowner, and politician
      - Aagaat Gerhardine Skavlan Daae (1864–1946), librarian and historian
  - Anders Daae (1802–1866), parish priest at Kvernes Church and provost for Nordmøre
  - Sara Margrethe Daae (1806–1841), wife of Hans Conrad Thoresen
    - Suzannah Daae Thoresen (1836–1914), wife of Henrik Ibsen
