= Seim Church =

Church in Vestland, Norway

- Seim kyrkje
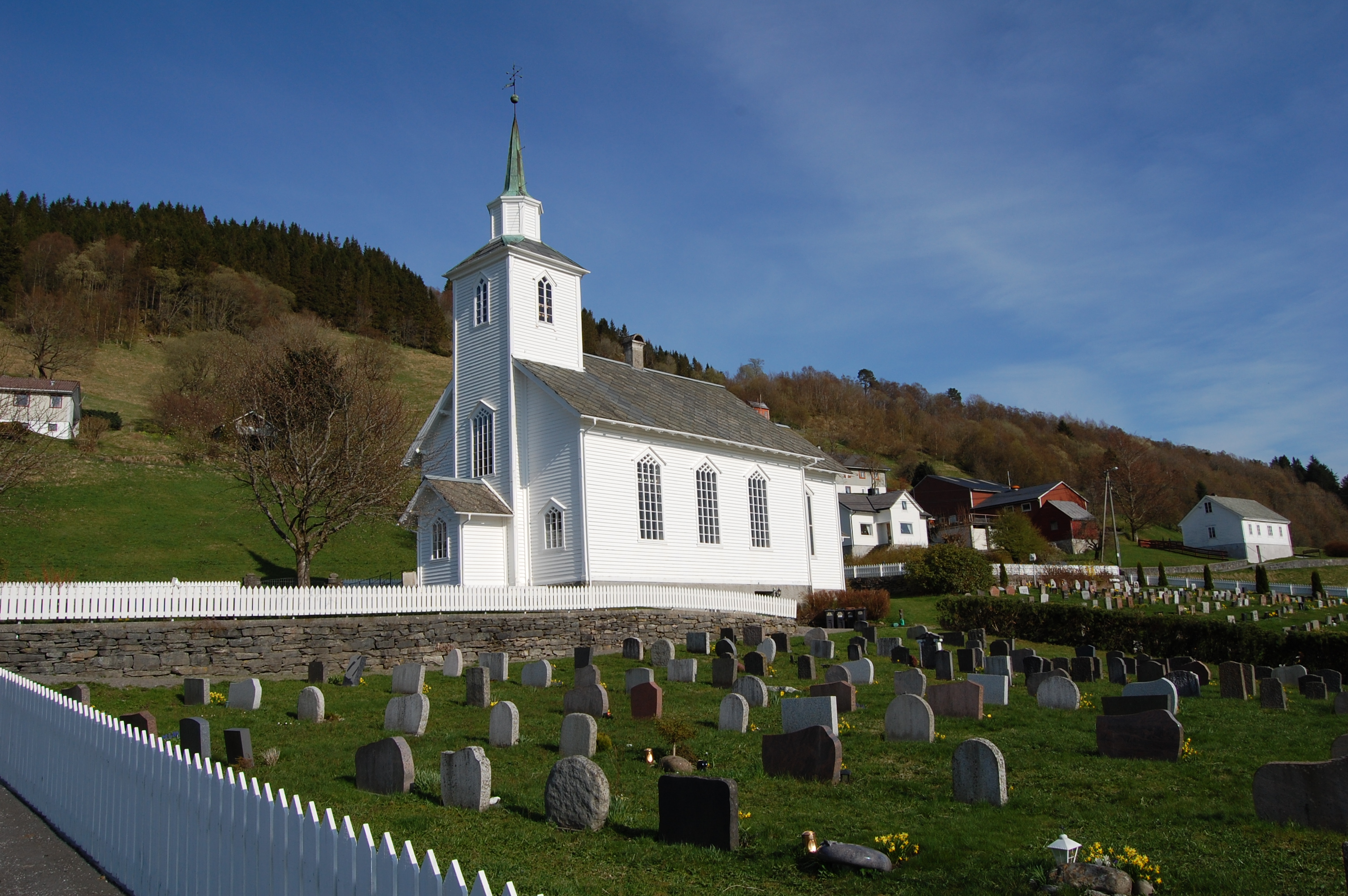
- View of the church
- Seim Church
- 60°37′01″N 5°16′37″E
- Location: Alver Municipality, Vestland
- Country: Norway
- Denomination: Church of Norway
- Previous denomination: Catholic Church
- Churchmanship: Evangelical Lutheran

History
- Status: Parish church
- Founded: 13th century
- Consecrated: 16 July 1878

Architecture
- Functional status: Active
- Architect: Johannes Øvsthus
- Architectural type: Long church
- Completed: 1878 (148 years ago)

Specifications
- Capacity: 180
- Materials: Wood

Administration
- Diocese: Bjørgvin bispedømme
- Deanery: Nordhordland prosti
- Parish: Knarvik
- Norwegian Cultural Heritage Site
- Type: Church
- Status: Not protected
- ID: 85410

Seim Church (Norwegian: Seim kyrkje) is a parish church of the Church of Norway in Alver Municipality in Vestland county, Norway. It is located in the village of Seim. It is one of the four churches for the Knarvik parish which is part of the Nordhordland prosti (deanery) in the Diocese of Bjørgvin. The white, wooden church was built in a long church design in 1878 using plans drawn up by the architect Johannes Øvsthus from Hosanger. The church seats about 180 people.

== History ==
The earliest existing historical records of the church date back to the year 1360, but it was likely built before that time. The first church was likely a wooden stave church and it was located about 500 metres (1,600 ft) southeast of the present location of the church. This medieval building was probably built during the 13th century and it was torn down around the year 1610. After tearing down the old church, a new timber-framed building on the same location was built. (An alternate theory is that in 1610, the old stave church was renovated and enlarged that year, since the new building was about twice as large as the old one. If that is the case, the old church may have been turned into the choir and sacristy with the addition becoming the new nave.)

In 1839, the church building was damaged in a storm. It was repaired. By the 1860s, the church was in poor condition and could no longer be used during the winters so it was decided to build a new, larger church. The new church would be built a little closer to the village of Seim, about 500 metres (1,600 ft) to the northwest. The new church was the third building to hold the name Seim church and it was completed in 1878. The construction work was led by Mons N. Skare and Ole Knudsen Lilleokse. The new building was consecrated on 16 July 1878. Sometime after the new church was completed, the old church was torn down.

Historically, Seim Church belonged to the parish of Hammer before 1749. In that year, it was separated from Hammer and transferred to Hosanger parish (as an exclave). In 1885, Seim was transferred from Hosanger Municipality to Alversund parish. In 1964, the church was transferred to the parish of Lindås Municipality.

== Media gallery ==
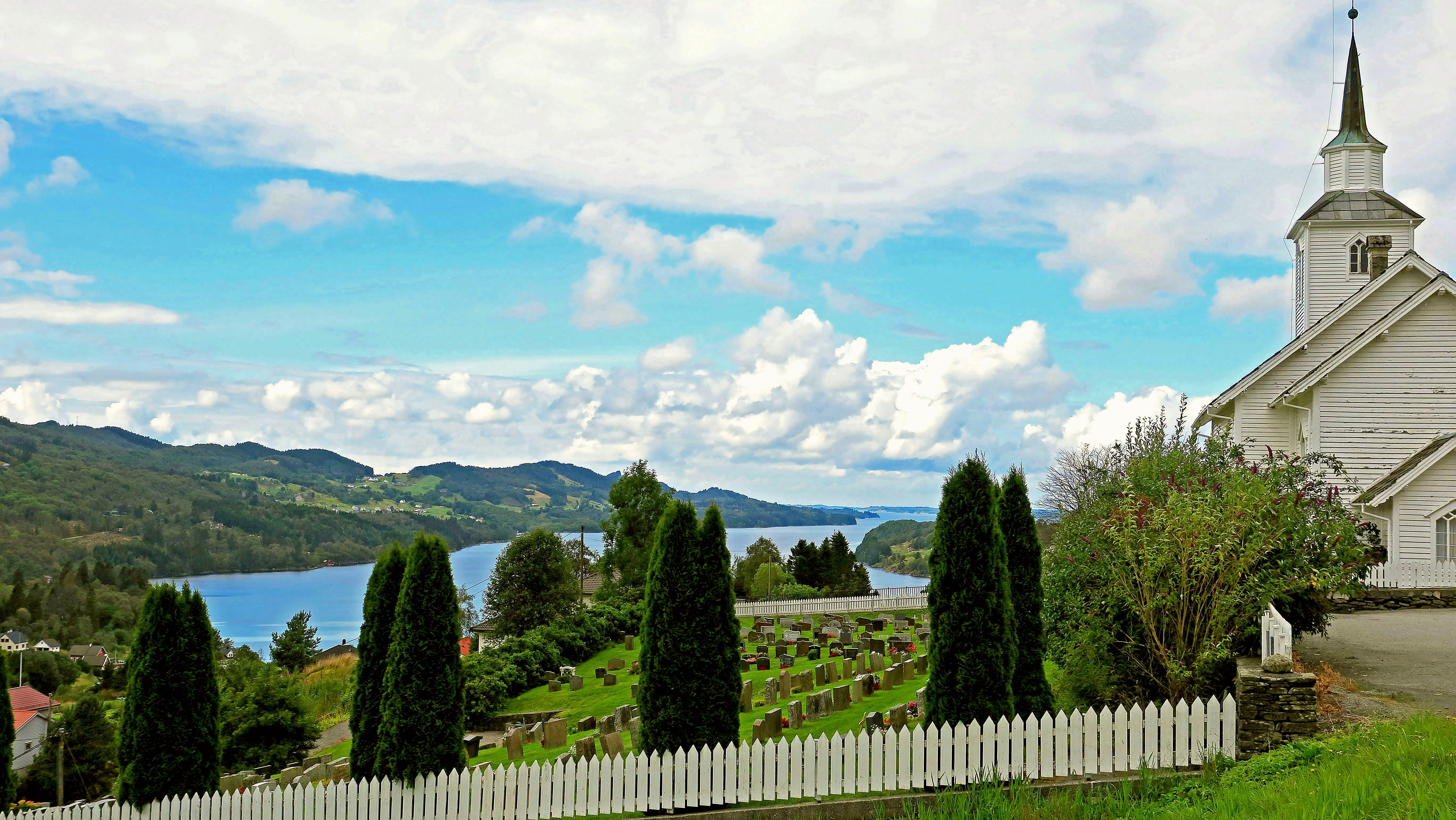

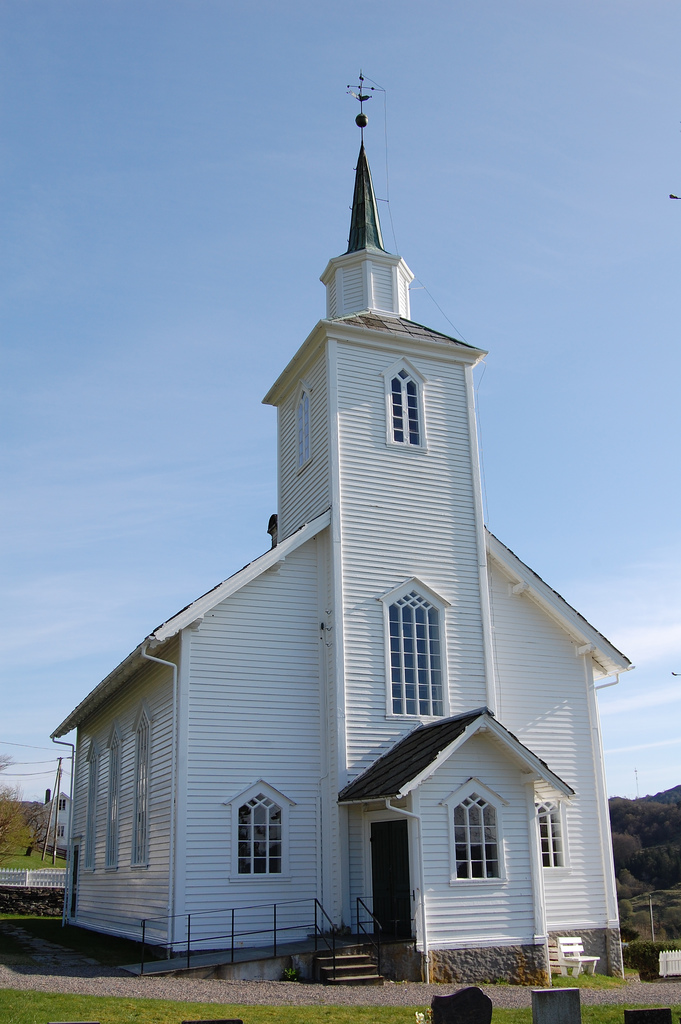

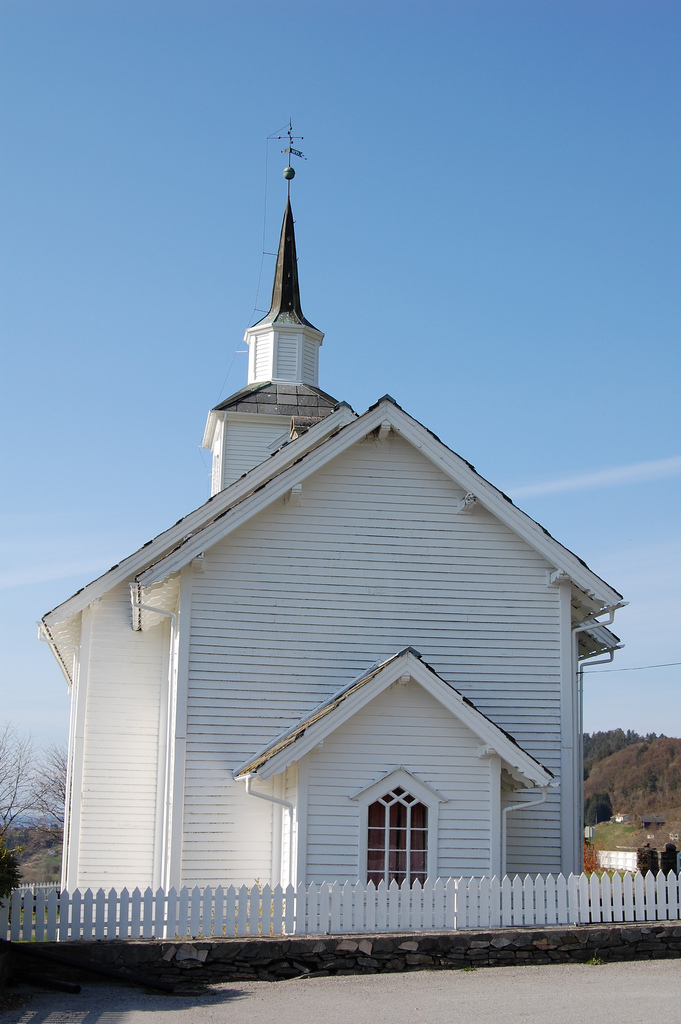

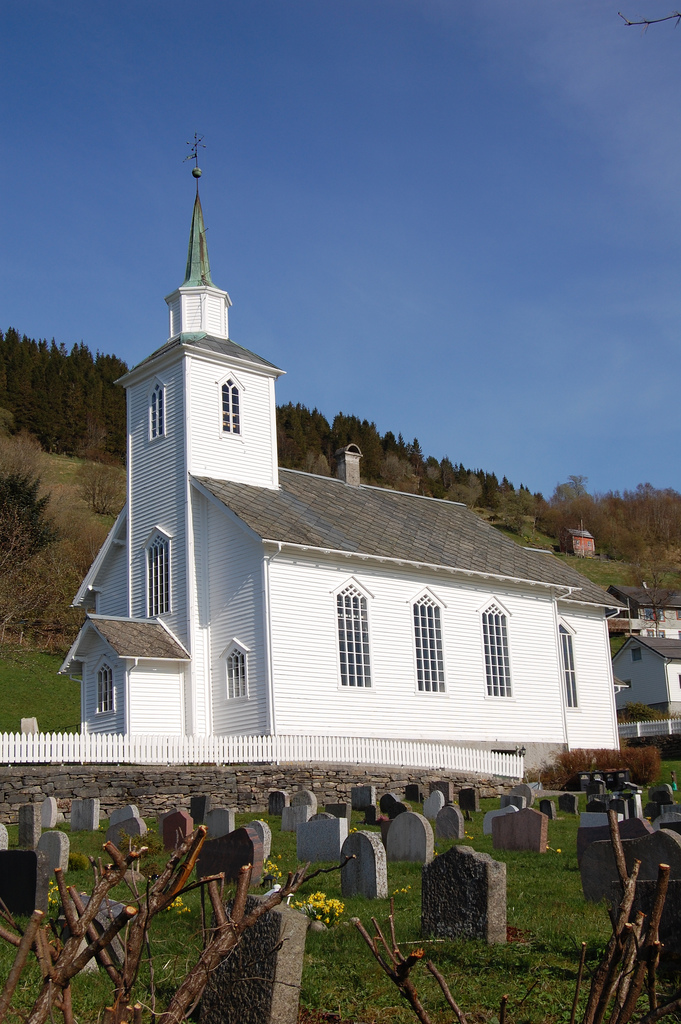

== See also ==
- List of churches in Bjørgvin
