= Tove Linnea Brandvik =

Norwegian politician (born 1968)

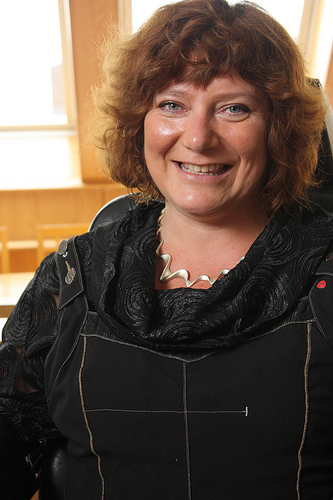
Tove Linnea Brandvik

Tove Linnea Brandvik (born 15 November 1968) is a Norwegian politician for the Labour Party.

She was born in Levanger Municipality as a daughter of joiner Birger Bach and teacher Olaug Langdal. She took lower secondary education in Leirfjord Municipality from 1981 to 1984, and upper secondary education in Sandnessjøen from 1984 to 1987. She then attended the Norwegian School of Management in Bergen and Trondheim from 1987 to 1990 and 1994 to 1997.

She chaired her local party chapter from 2002 to 2004, and is a member of the Labour Party central committee from 2007. She was mayor of Lindås Municipality from 2003 to 2007, and then a municipal council member in the executive committee from 2007 to 2011. She served as a deputy representative to the Parliament of Norway from Hordaland during the terms 2005–2009 and 2009–2013. During the second term she held a regular seat since Anne-Grete Strøm-Erichsen was a member of Stoltenberg's Second Cabinet. She was a member of the Standing Committee on Labour and Social Affairs.

Brandvik has been a board member of Hordaland Olje og Gass from 2003 to 2007, chaired the Regional Council for Nordhordaland and Gulen since 2007 and been a member of many municipal boards. She has also been a judge in Nordhordland District Court. She is the first member of parliament in Norway to utilise a wheelchair.
