= Lindås (village) =

Village in Alver Municipality, Norway

- Village
- Interactive map of Lindås
- Coordinates: 60.73639°N 5.16102°E
- Country: Norway
- Region: Western Norway
- County: Vestland
- District: Nordhordland
- Municipality: Alver Municipality

Area
  - Total: 1.07 km^{2} (0.41 sq mi)
- Elevation: 70 m (230 ft)

Population (2025)
  - Total: 1,448
  - Density: 1,353/km^{2} (3,500/sq mi)
- Time zone: UTC+01:00 (CET)
  - Summer (DST): UTC+02:00 (CEST)
- Post Code: 5955 Lindås

Lindås is a village in Alver Municipality in Vestland county, Norway. The village is located on the Lindås peninsula, about 25 kilometres (16 mi) north of the village of Knarvik and about 10 kilometres (6.2 mi) southeast of the Mongstad industrial area. The village of Hundvin lies about 8 kilometres (5.0 mi) southeast of Lindås. Lindås Church is located in the village.

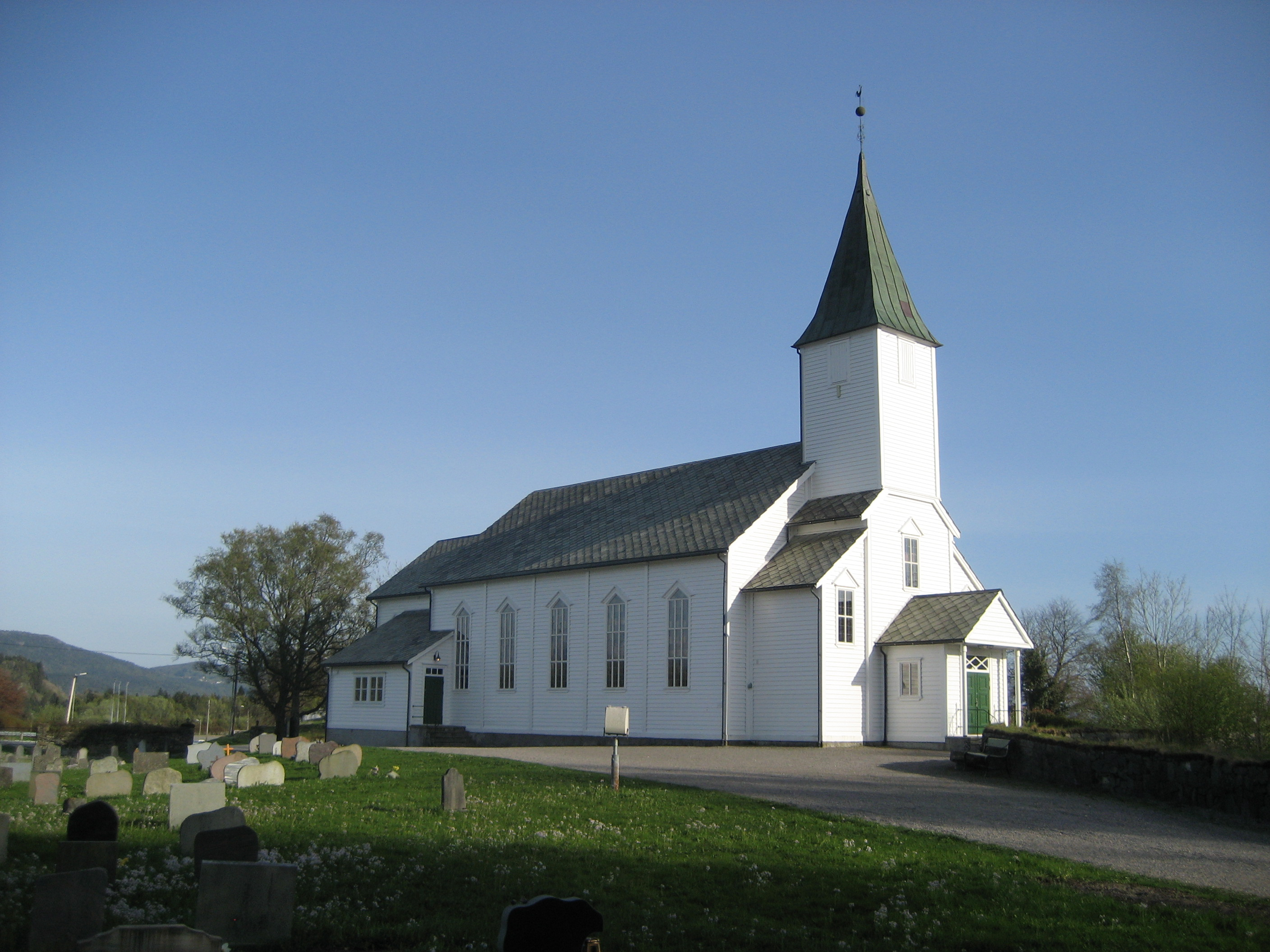
View of Lindås Church

The 1.07-square-kilometre (260-acre) village has a population (2025) of 1,448 and a population density of 1,353 inhabitants per square kilometre (3,500/sq mi).

== History ==
Prior to 1964, the village was the original administrative centre of the old Lindås Municipality. In 1964, Lindås Municipality was greatly expanded and the administrative centre was moved to Knarvik.
