= Arnafjord Church =

Church in Vestland, Norway

- Arnafjord kyrkje
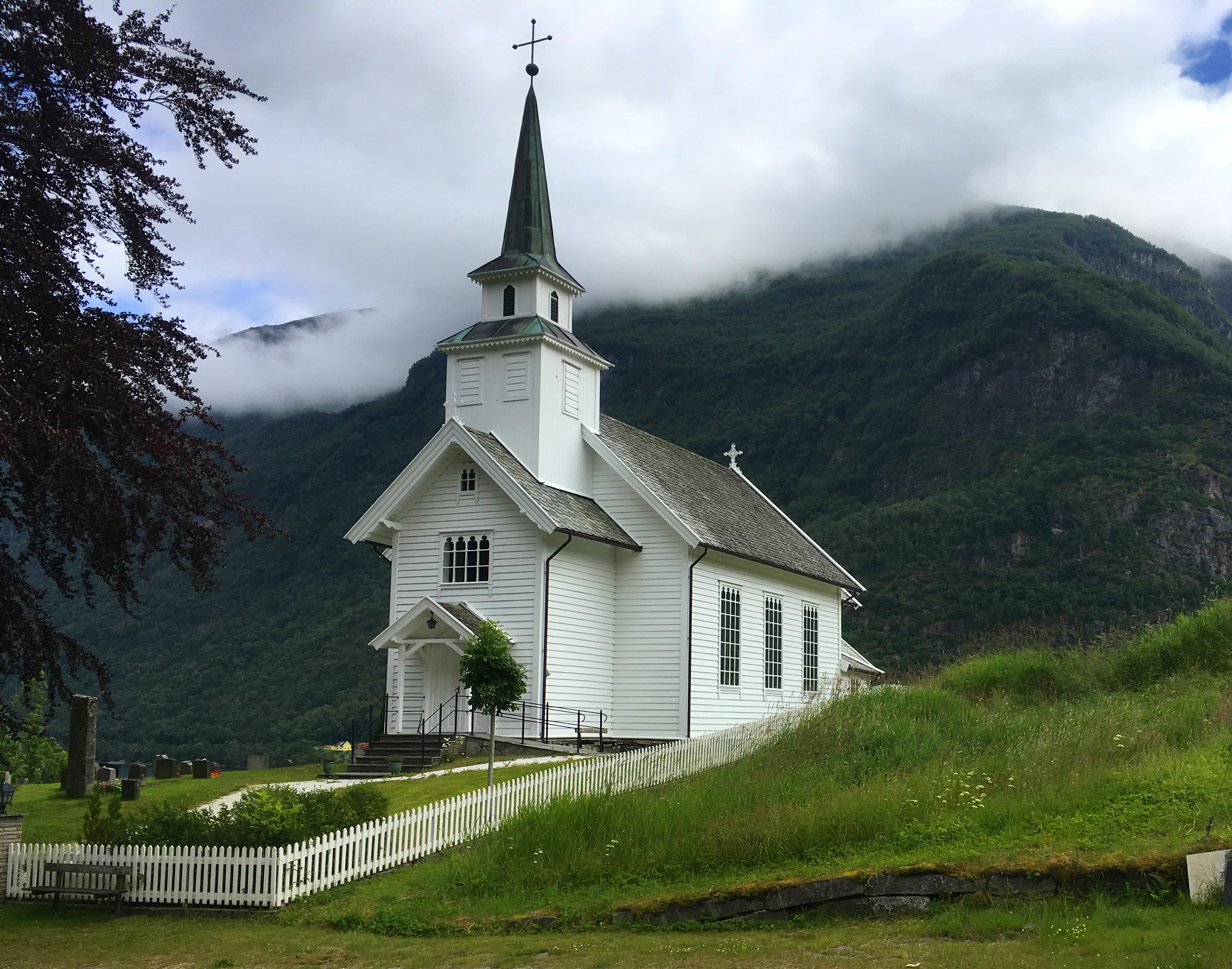
- View of the church
- Arnafjord Church
- 61°01′21″N 6°23′05″E
- Location: Vik Municipality, Vestland
- Country: Norway
- Denomination: Church of Norway
- Previous denomination: Catholic Church
- Churchmanship: Evangelical Lutheran

History
- Former name: Flete kyrkje
- Status: Parish church
- Founded: 12th century
- Consecrated: 21 October 1880

Architecture
- Functional status: Active
- Architect: Johannes Gjertsen
- Architectural type: Long church
- Completed: 1880 (146 years ago)

Specifications
- Capacity: 180
- Materials: Wood

Administration
- Diocese: Bjørgvin bispedømme
- Deanery: Sogn prosti
- Parish: Arnafjord
- Norwegian Cultural Heritage Site
- Type: Church
- Status: Listed
- ID: 83793

Arnafjord Church (Norwegian: Arnafjord kyrkje) is a parish church of the Church of Norway in Vik Municipality in Vestland county, Norway. It is located in the village of Nese, along the Arnafjorden. It is the church for the Arnafjord parish which is part of the Sogn prosti (deanery) in the Diocese of Bjørgvin. The white, wooden church was built in a long church design in 1880. The master builder John Gjertsen from Sogndal Municipality made the designs, while builder Anders Korsvold was responsible for the construction. The church seats about 180 people.

== History ==
The earliest existing historical records of the church date back to the year 1340, but it was not built that year. The first building was a wooden stave church that was probably built in the 1100s. This first church was located in Flete, about 2.5 kilometres (1.6 mi) across the Arnafjorden to the southeast of the present site. In 1645, a new church located at the present site in Nese was constructed and after it was completed, the old stave church was torn down and the materials from the old church were used by the local farmers. The last worship service at the old church was held and then one week later, the first service was held in the new church.

By the late 19th century, the church was in poor condition and it was also too small for the congregation. There was much correspondence between the parish and the owner of the church. Eventually, the owner sold the church building to the parish. The parish then decided to tear down the old building and to construct a new church just a few meters to the southeast of the old building. The parish hired Johannes Gjertsen to design the new building and Anders Korsvold was hired as the lead builder. Many of the materials from the 1645 church were reused in the construction of the new church. The new church was consecrated on 21 October 1880. The new building had a 11.9-by-8.9-metre (39 ft × 29 ft) nave and a 5-by-5.25-metre (16.4 ft × 17.2 ft) chancel. In 1963, the church had electric heat installed as part of a large renovation. In 1968, a sacristy was built that included a bathroom.

== Media gallery ==
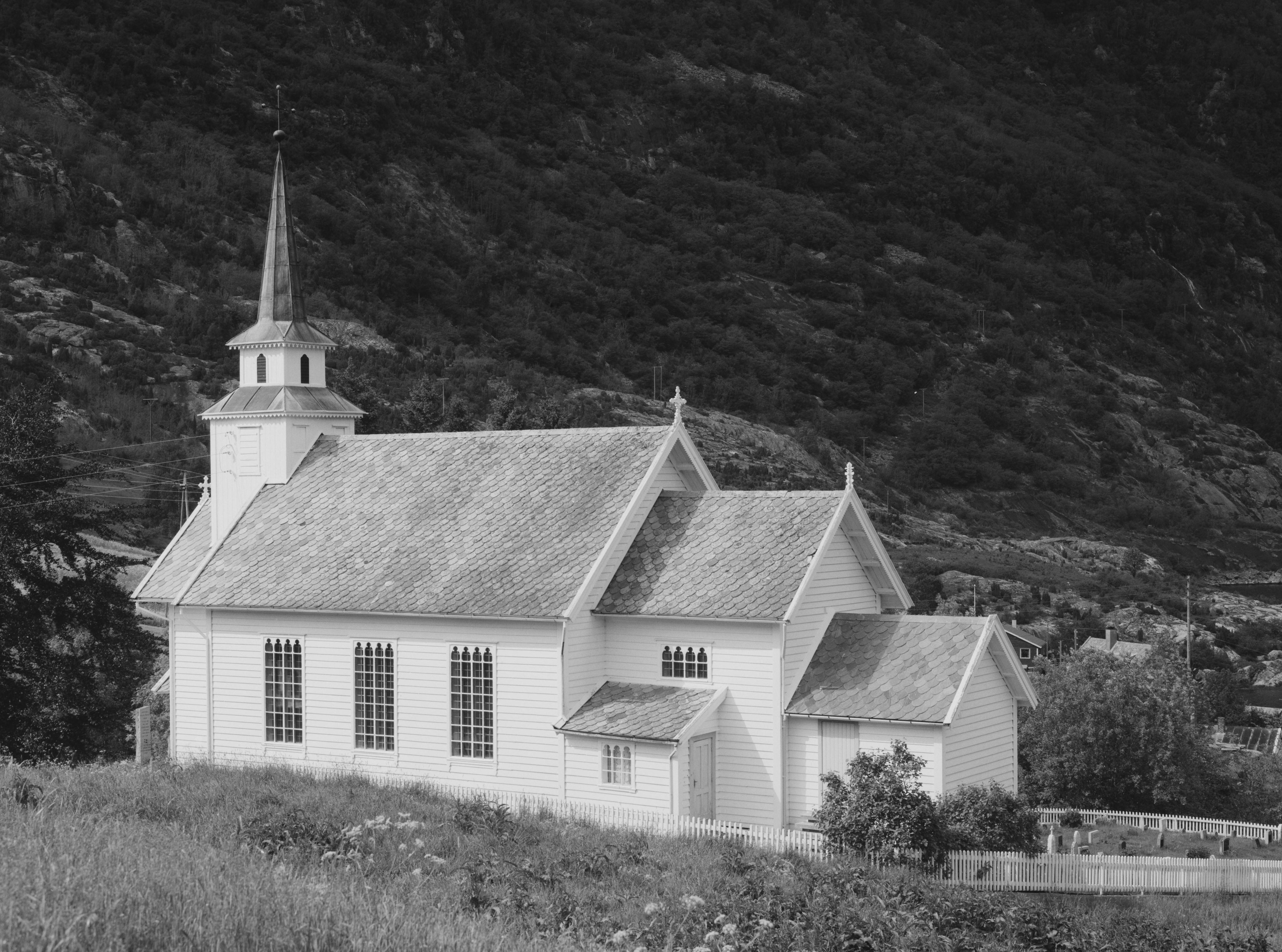
View of the church in 1978

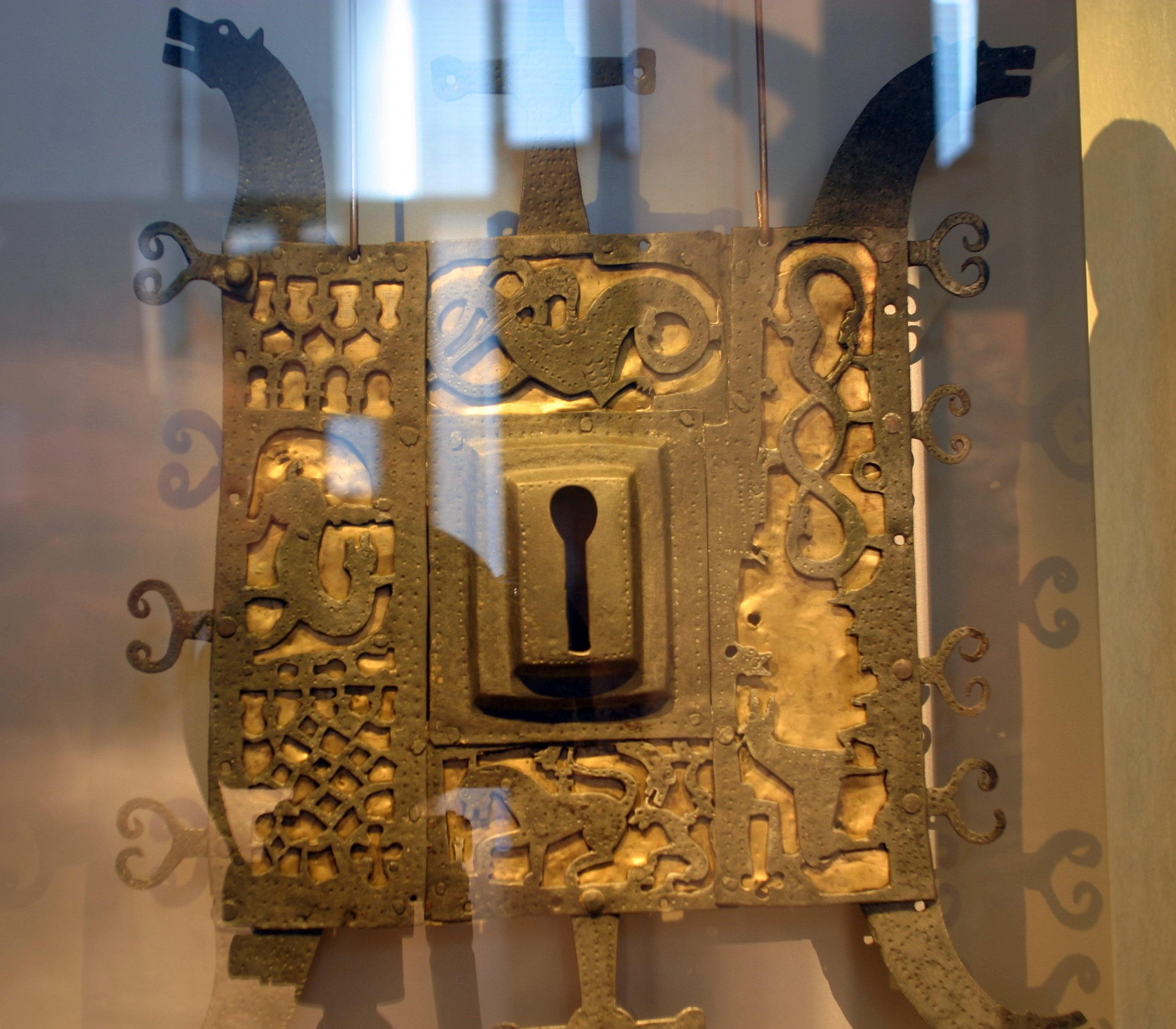
12th century door lock in the present church

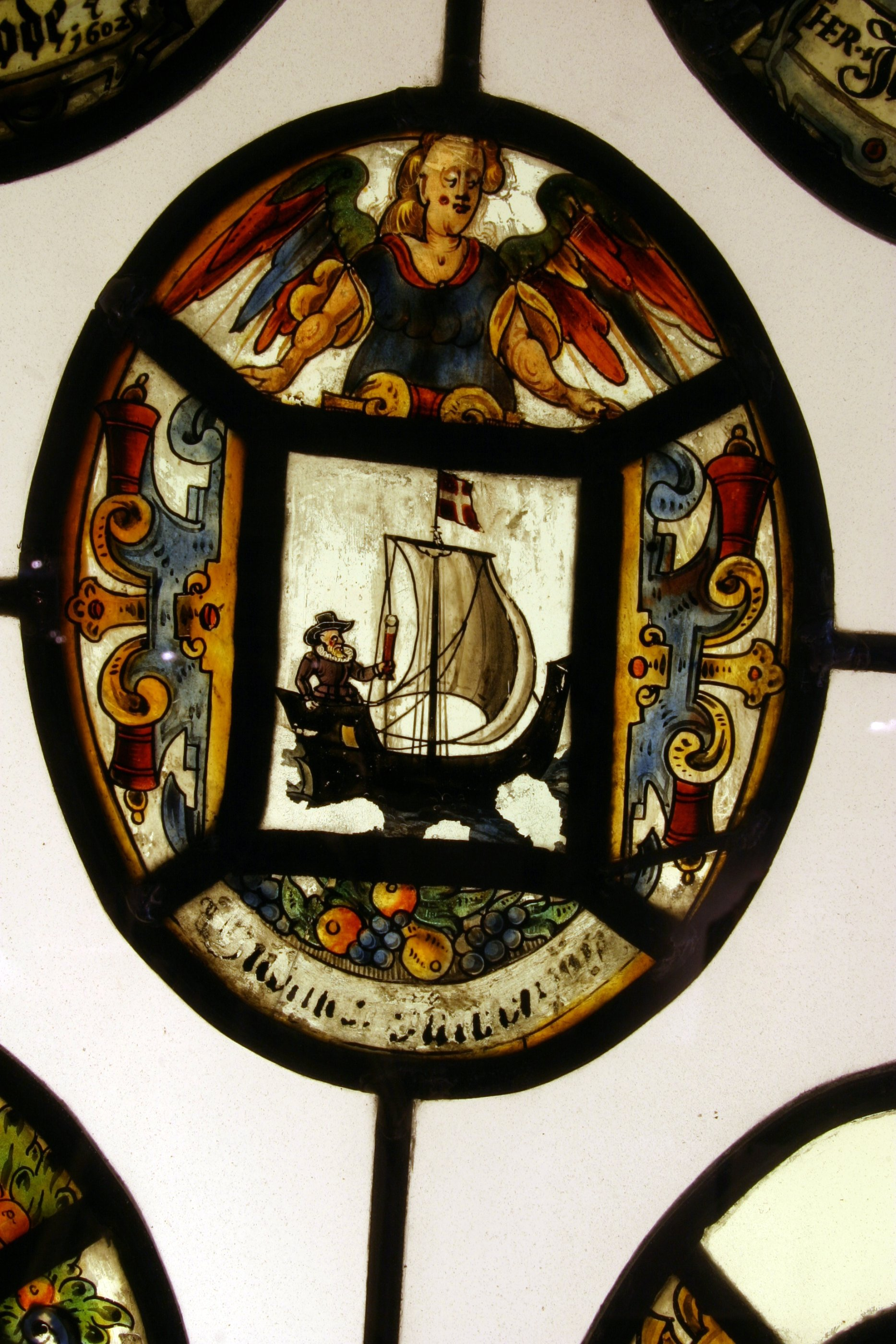
Glass painting from the church, now in the Bergen Museum

== See also ==
- List of churches in Bjørgvin
