= Lygra Church =

Church in Vestland, Norway

- Lygra kyrkje
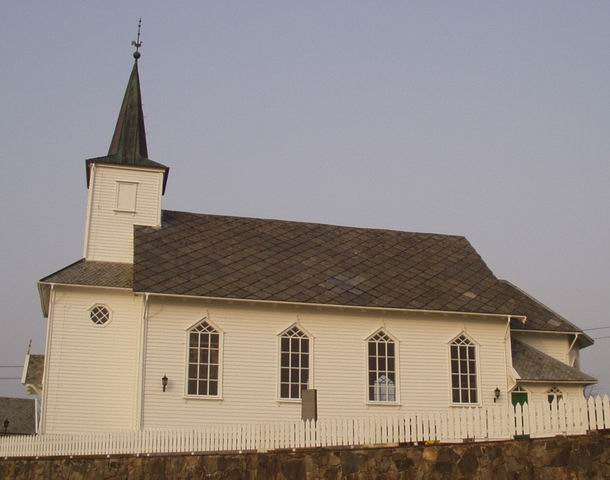
- View of the church
- Lygra Church
- 60°41′20″N 5°07′09″E
- Location: Alver Municipality, Vestland
- Country: Norway
- Denomination: Church of Norway
- Churchmanship: Evangelical Lutheran

History
- Status: Parish church
- Founded: 13th century
- Consecrated: 1892

Architecture
- Functional status: Active
- Architect: Peter Gabrielsen Spjotøy
- Architectural type: Long church
- Completed: 1892 (134 years ago)

Specifications
- Capacity: 180
- Materials: Wood

Administration
- Diocese: Bjørgvin bispedømme
- Deanery: Nordhordland prosti
- Parish: Knarvik
- Norwegian Cultural Heritage Site
- Type: Church
- Status: Listed
- ID: 84346

Lygra Church (Norwegian: Lygra kyrkje) is a parish church of the Church of Norway in Alver Municipality in Vestland county, Norway. It is located on the small island of Luro. It is one of the four churches for the Knarvik parish which is part of the Nordhordland prosti (deanery) in the Diocese of Bjørgvin. The white, wooden church was built in a long church design in 1892 using plans drawn up by the architect Peter Gabrielsen Spjotøy. The church seats about 180 people.

The church is surrounded by a cemetery. Notable burials at the cemetery include Ludvig Daae (1723–1786).

== History ==
There has been a church on this island since the Middle Ages since this area had been an old royal estate since the time of King Olaf Haroldson. The earliest existing historical records of the church date back to the year 1321, but it was built before that time. The first church was a wooden stave church that was likely built during the 13th century. During the early-1600s, the church was torn down and replaced with a new timber-framed long church on the same site. The nave measured 13 by 9.5 metres (43 ft × 31 ft) and the chancel measured 6 by 7.5 metres (20 ft × 25 ft). In the early 1700s, the church was significantly renovated and rebuilt.

On 6 January 1772, the church burned down after being struck by lightning. The old church ruins were torn down and a new church was built to replace it on the same site. The new church was consecrated exactly one year to the day after the fire, on 6 January 1773. The building was timber-framed and it had a rectangular nave measuring 10.7 by 8.2 metres (35 ft × 27 ft) and it had a lower, narrower and almost square chancel measuring about 5.8 by 6.3 metres (19 ft × 21 ft) in the east. The church had a tower above the church porch on the west end. The building underwent a major repair in 1866, when new floors, new windows, and new benches were installed. In 1892, the church was torn down and a new church was built on the same site. The architect was Petter Gabrielsen. During the 20th century, a basement was excavated under the church in order to add a coat room, bathrooms, and storage.

== Media gallery ==
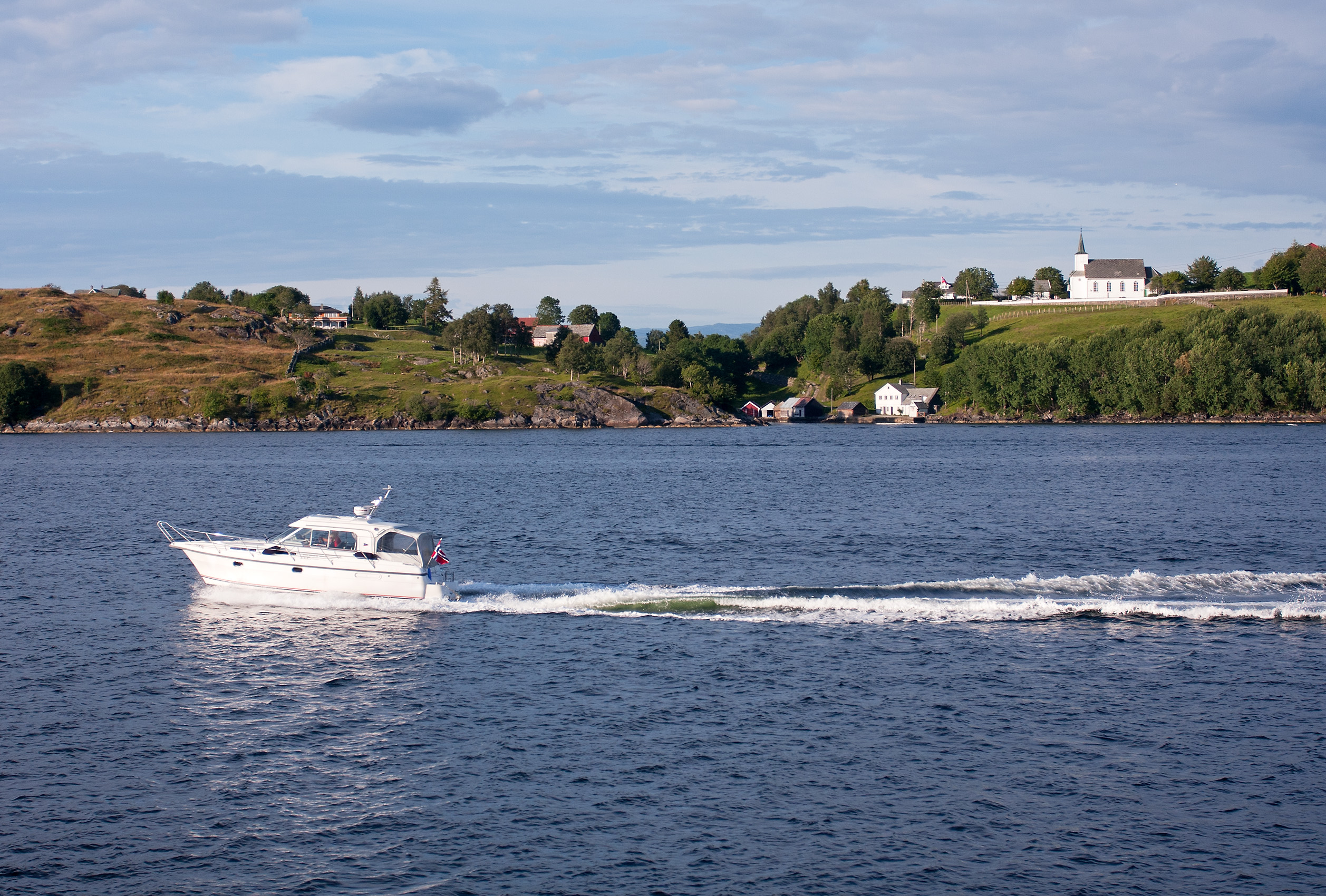

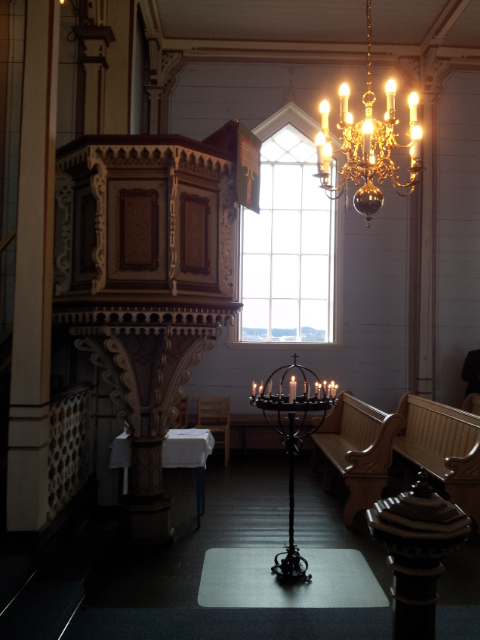

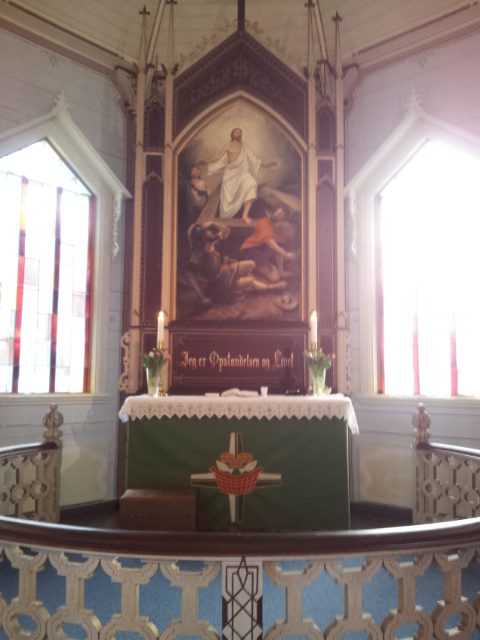

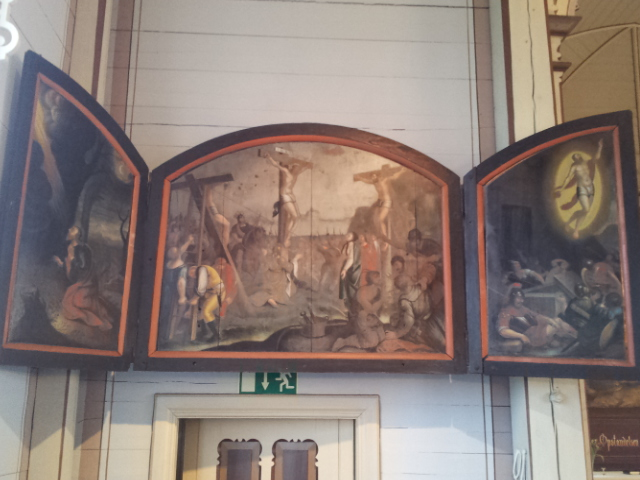

== See also ==
- List of churches in Bjørgvin
