= Lindås Church =

Church in Vestland, Norway

- Lindås kyrkje
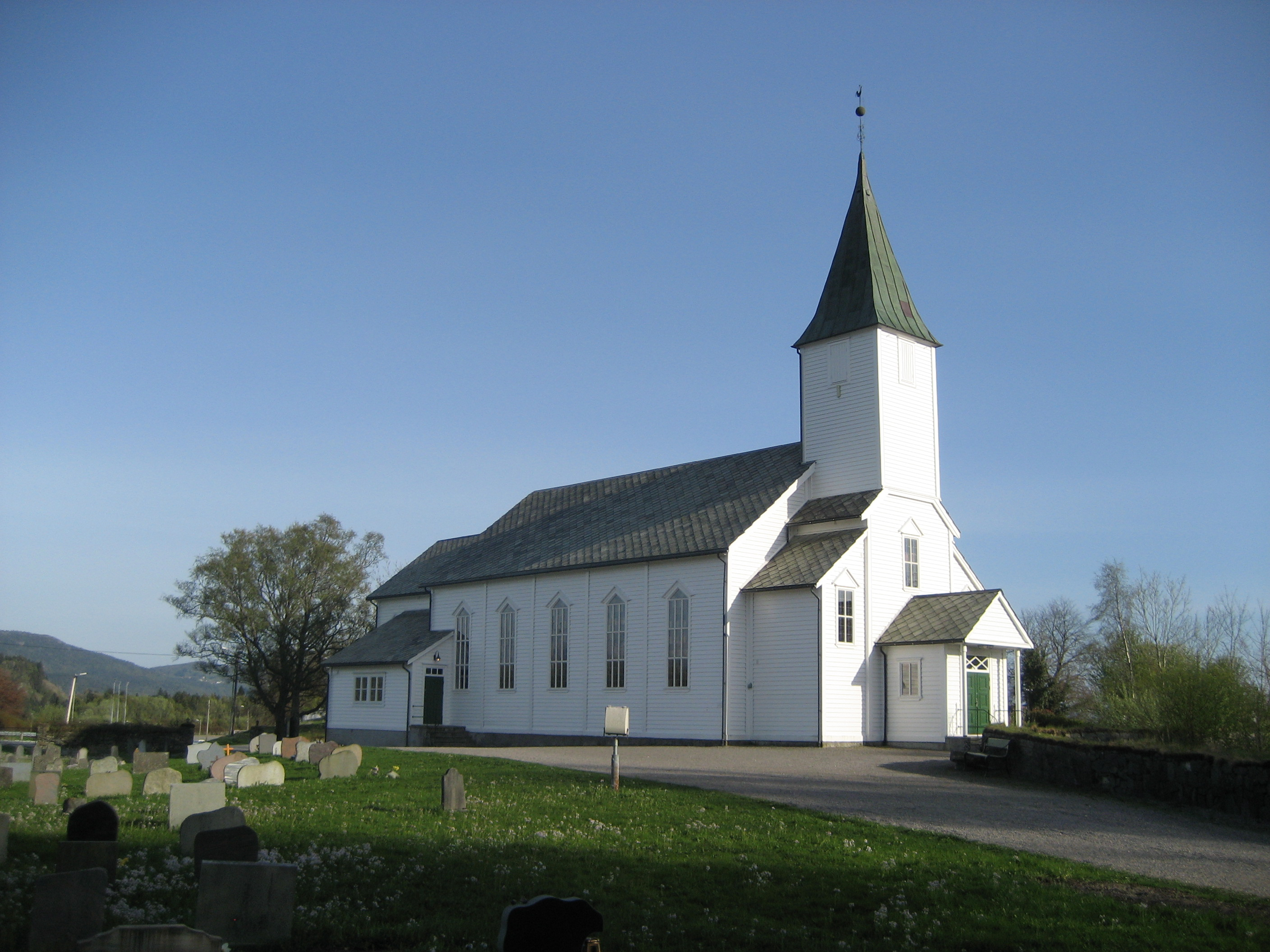
- View of the church
- Lindås Church
- 60°44′13″N 5°09′33″E
- Location: Alver Municipality, Vestland
- Country: Norway
- Denomination: Church of Norway
- Previous denomination: Catholic Church
- Churchmanship: Evangelical Lutheran

History
- Status: Parish church
- Founded: 12th century
- Consecrated: 20 September 1865

Architecture
- Functional status: Active
- Architect: Ole Syslak
- Architectural type: Long church
- Style: Neo-Gothic
- Completed: 1865 (161 years ago)

Specifications
- Capacity: 370
- Materials: Wood

Administration
- Diocese: Bjørgvin bispedømme
- Deanery: Nordhordland prosti
- Parish: Lindås
- Norwegian Cultural Heritage Site
- Type: Church
- Status: Not protected
- ID: 84309

Lindås Church (Norwegian: Lindås kyrkje) is a parish church of the Church of Norway in Alver Municipality in Vestland county, Norway. It is located in the village of Lindås. It is one of the three churches for the Lindås parish which is part of the Nordhordland prosti (deanery) in the Diocese of Bjørgvin. The white, wooden, neo-Gothic church was built in a long church design in 1865 using plans drawn up by the architect Ole Syslak. The church seats about 370 people.

== History ==
There has been a church here at Lindås since the Middle Ages. The earliest existing historical records of the church date to the year 1315, but the church was not built that year. The first church was a stone building that was likely built during the 12th century. It is likely that the church was originally an open-air stone altar, with walls and a roof added later. The church had a rectangular nave with a square choir. This church was located about 10 metres (33 ft) about northeast of the present church. In the 1600s, the church was enlarged. A new wooden nave and a church porch with a steeple were added on the west end of the building. The old nave was converted into a choir and the old choir was turned into a sacristy.

In 1814, this church served as an election church (Norwegian: valgkirke). Together with more than 300 other parish churches across Norway, it was a polling station for elections to the 1814 Norwegian Constituent Assembly which wrote the Constitution of Norway. This was Norway's first national elections. Each church parish was a constituency that elected people called "electors" who later met together in each county to elect the representatives for the assembly that was to meet at Eidsvoll Manor later that year.

By the 1860s, the old church was in need of replacement. In 1864, the parish received permission to build a new church. In 1865, a new wooden church was built about 10 metres (33 ft) southwest of the old church. The new building was consecrated on 20 September 1865 by the Bishop Peter Hersleb Graah Birkeland. Not long afterwards, the old church was torn down. The church was significantly restored and rebuilt in the 1960s under the direction of architect Ole Landmark. This project was completed in 1969.

Priests that served at the church included Ludvig Daae (from 1759 onward).

== See also ==
- List of churches in Bjørgvin
