= Lygra =

Island in Alver, Norway

Luro Lygra
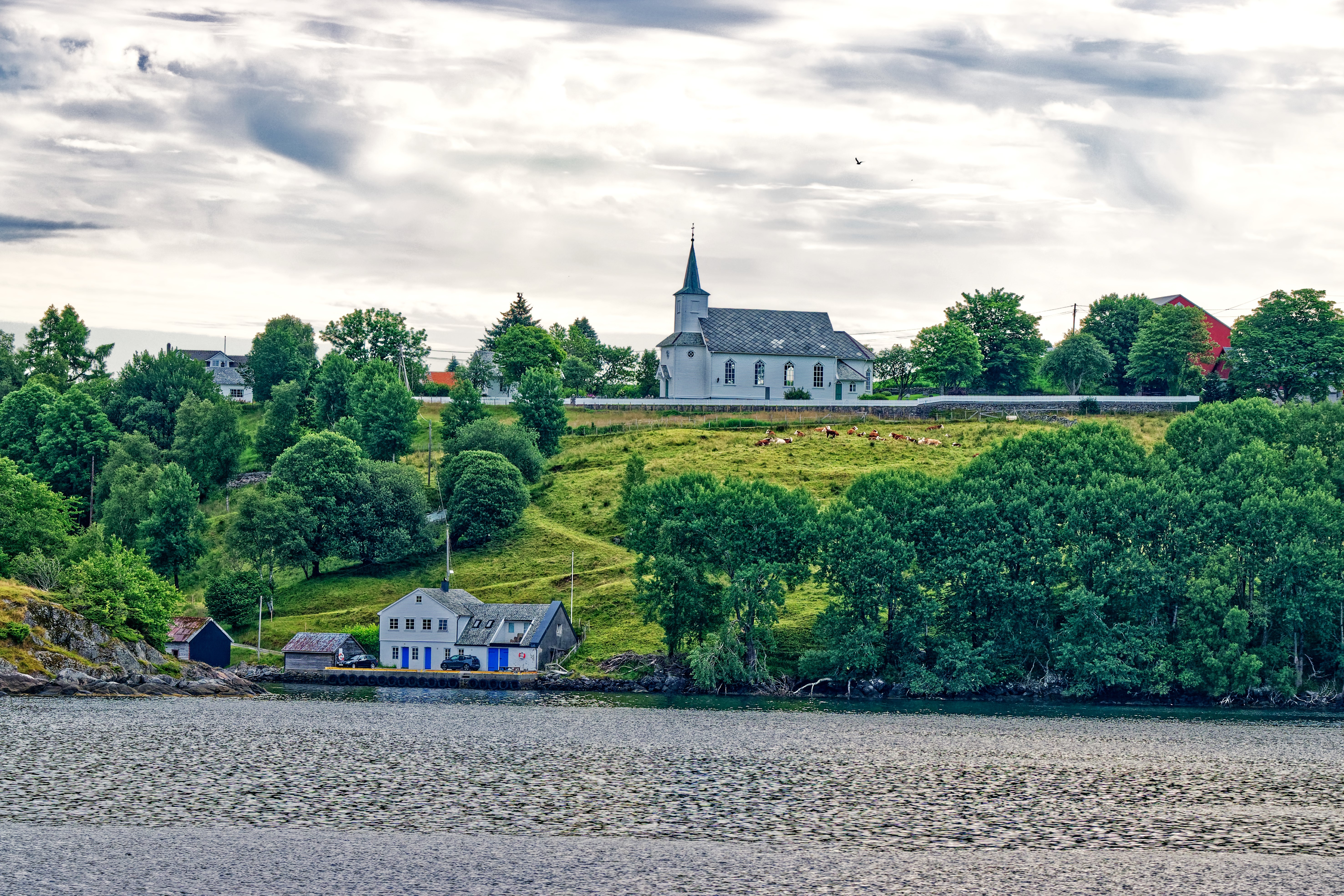
- View of the island and the local church
- Interactive map of Luro; Lygra

Geography
- Location: Vestland, Norway
- Coordinates: 60.6970°N 5.0984°E
- Area: 2.5 km^{2} (0.97 sq mi)
- Length: 4 km (2.5 mi)
- Width: 680 m (2230 ft)
- Highest elevation: 52 m (171 ft)

Administration
- Norway
- County: Vestland
- Municipality: Alver Municipality

Luro or Lygra is an island in Alver Municipality in Vestland county, Norway. The 2.5-square-kilometre (0.97 sq mi) island sits in the Lurefjorden which cuts into the Lindås peninsula. There is one road on the island that continues over a short bridge onto the mainland. The bridge was built in 1972. The island has been the site of Lygra Church since the Middle Ages. There are Viking Age tombstones that are still standing on the island. The Heathland Centre is located on Lygra. It is an information centre about the cultural landscape in this coastal area. There are nearly 200 hectares (490 acres) of heathland that are managed in traditional ways by local farmers.

== Media gallery ==
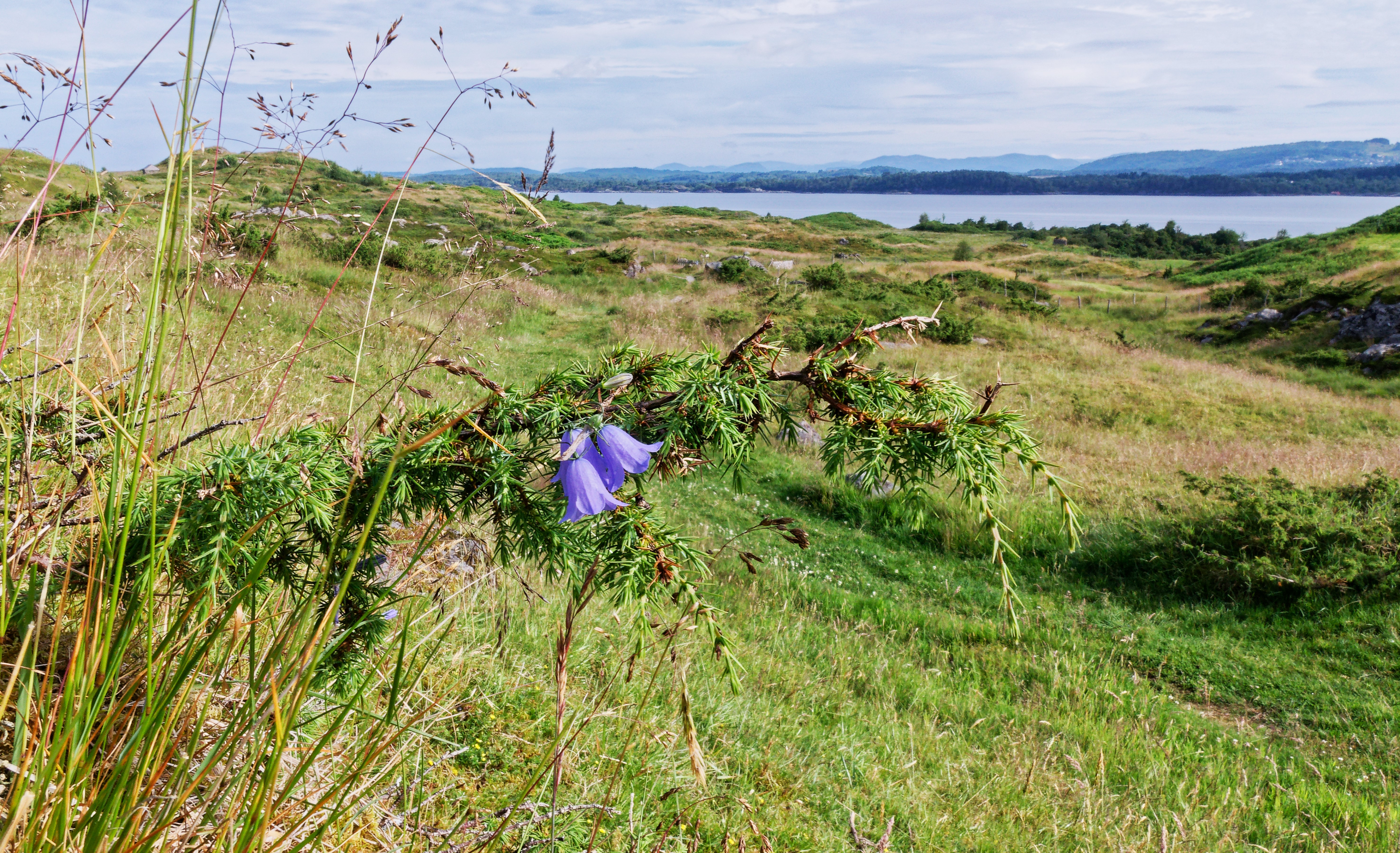
Typical landscape

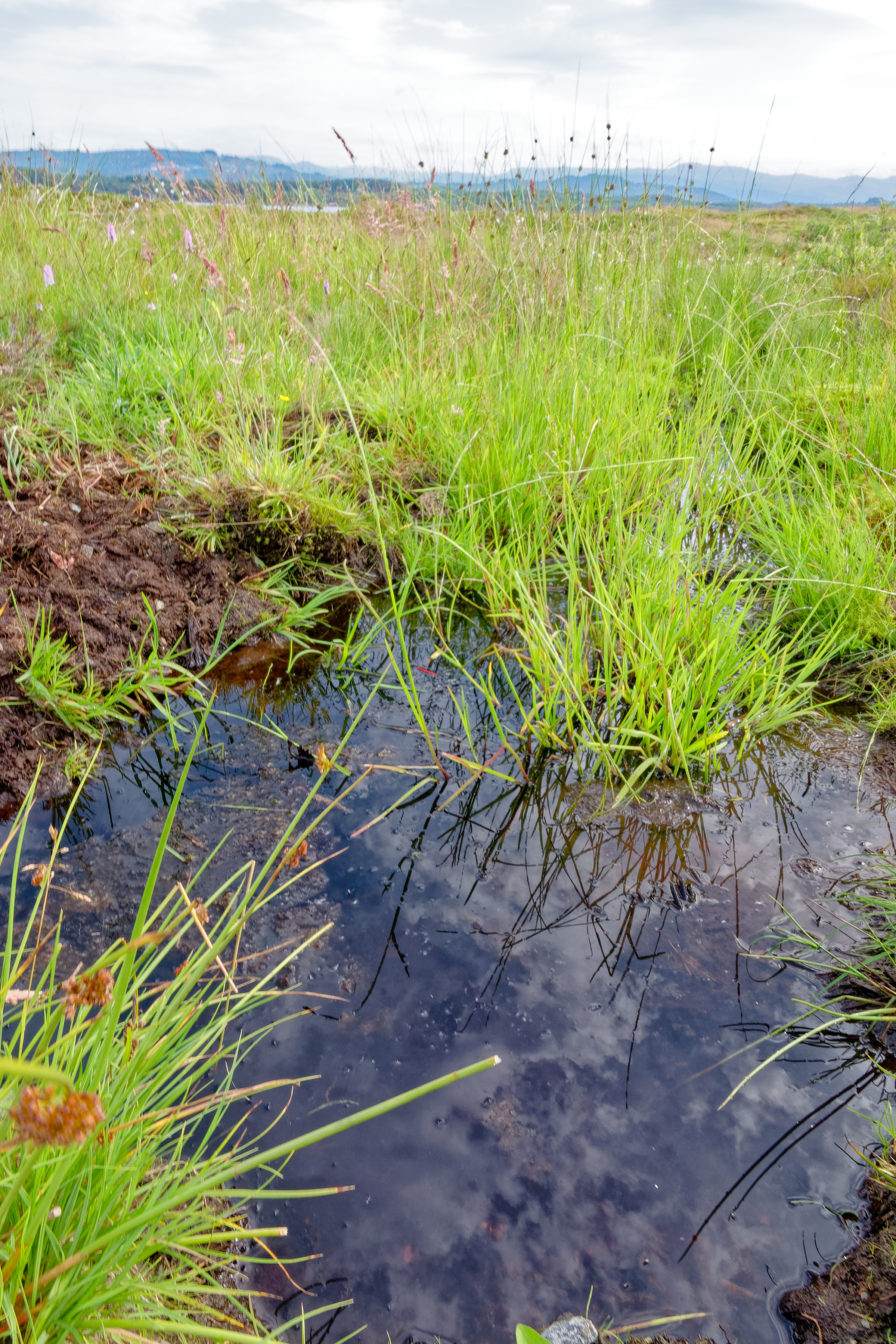
Moor pool

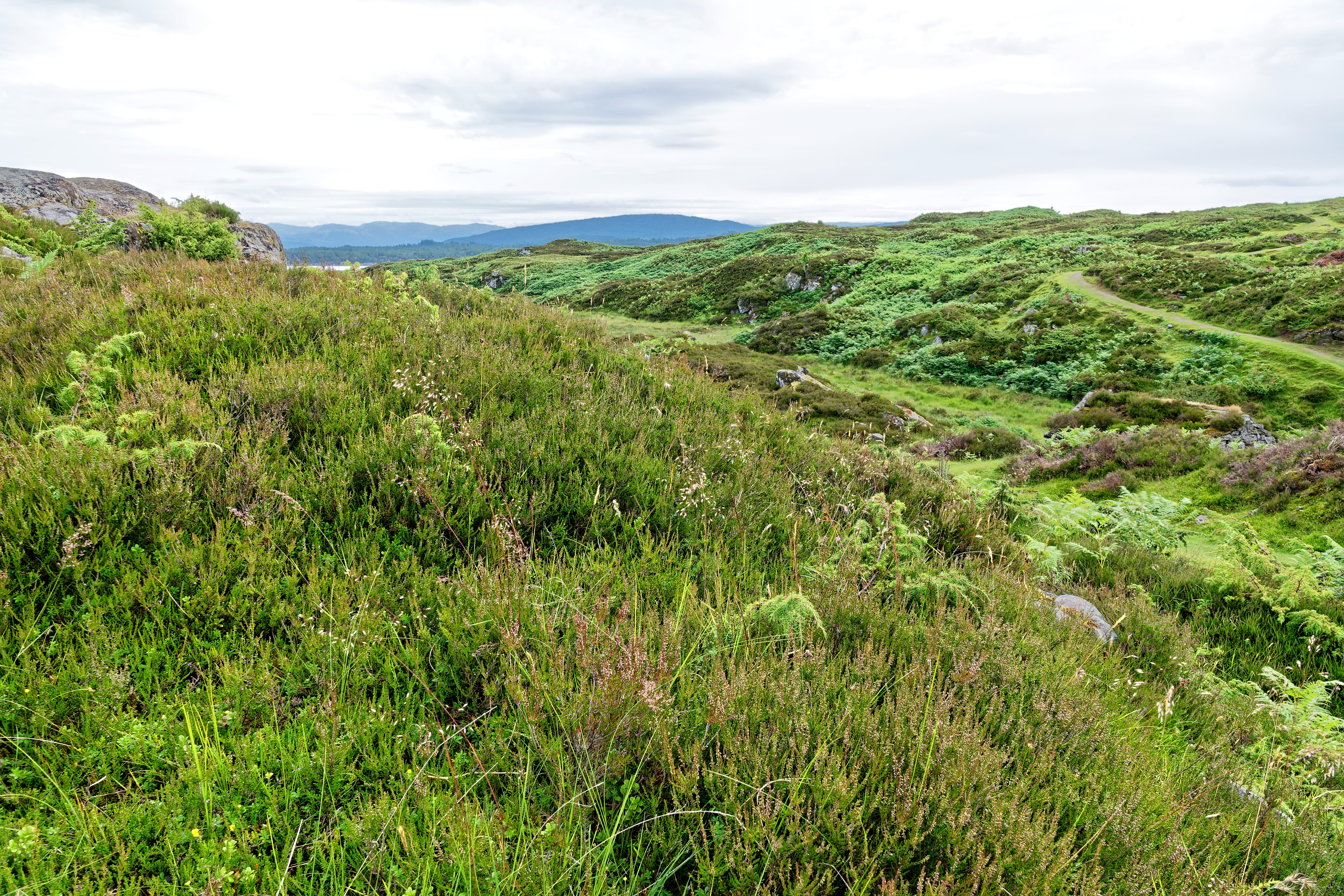
Heather covers large areas of the island

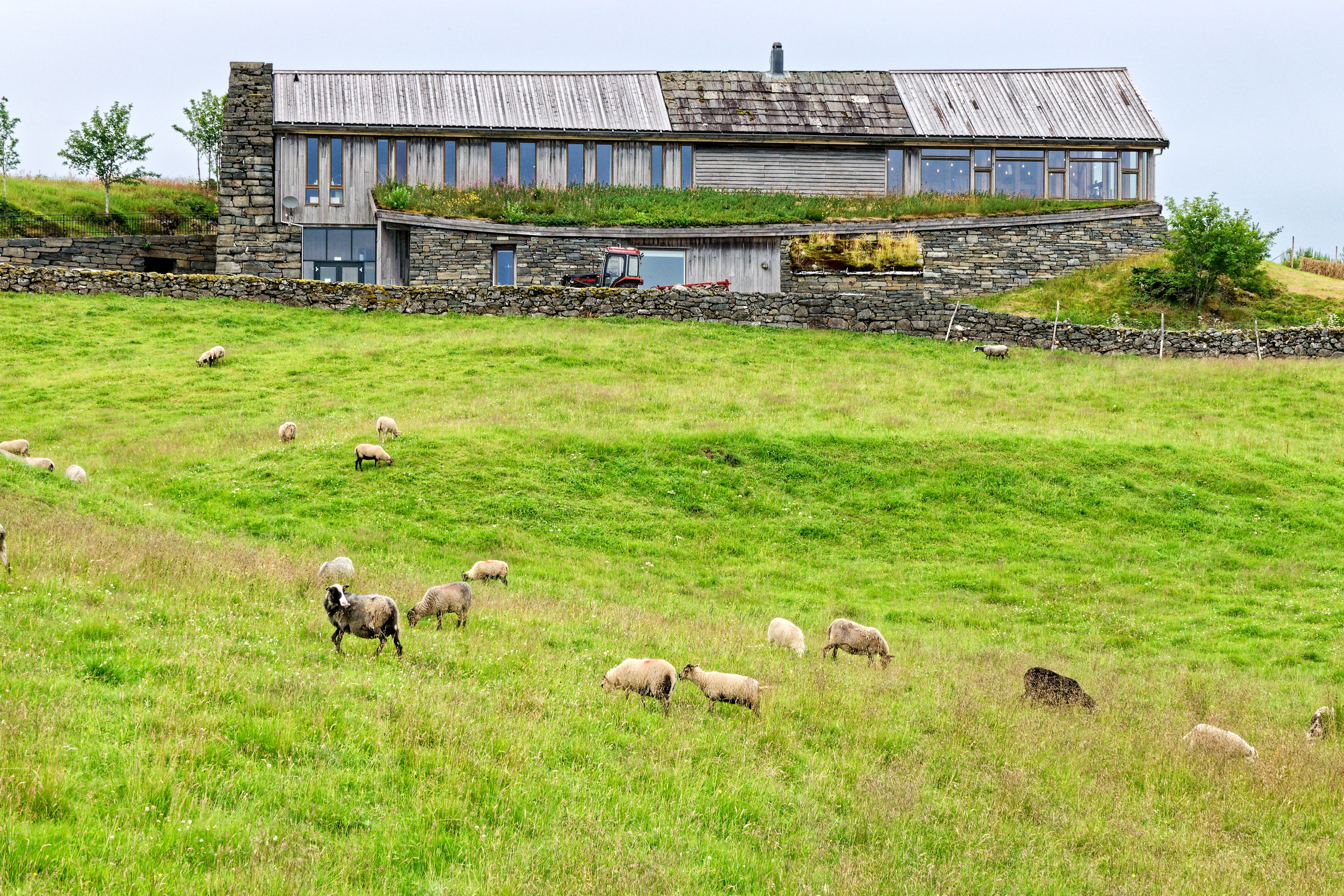
Heathland Center

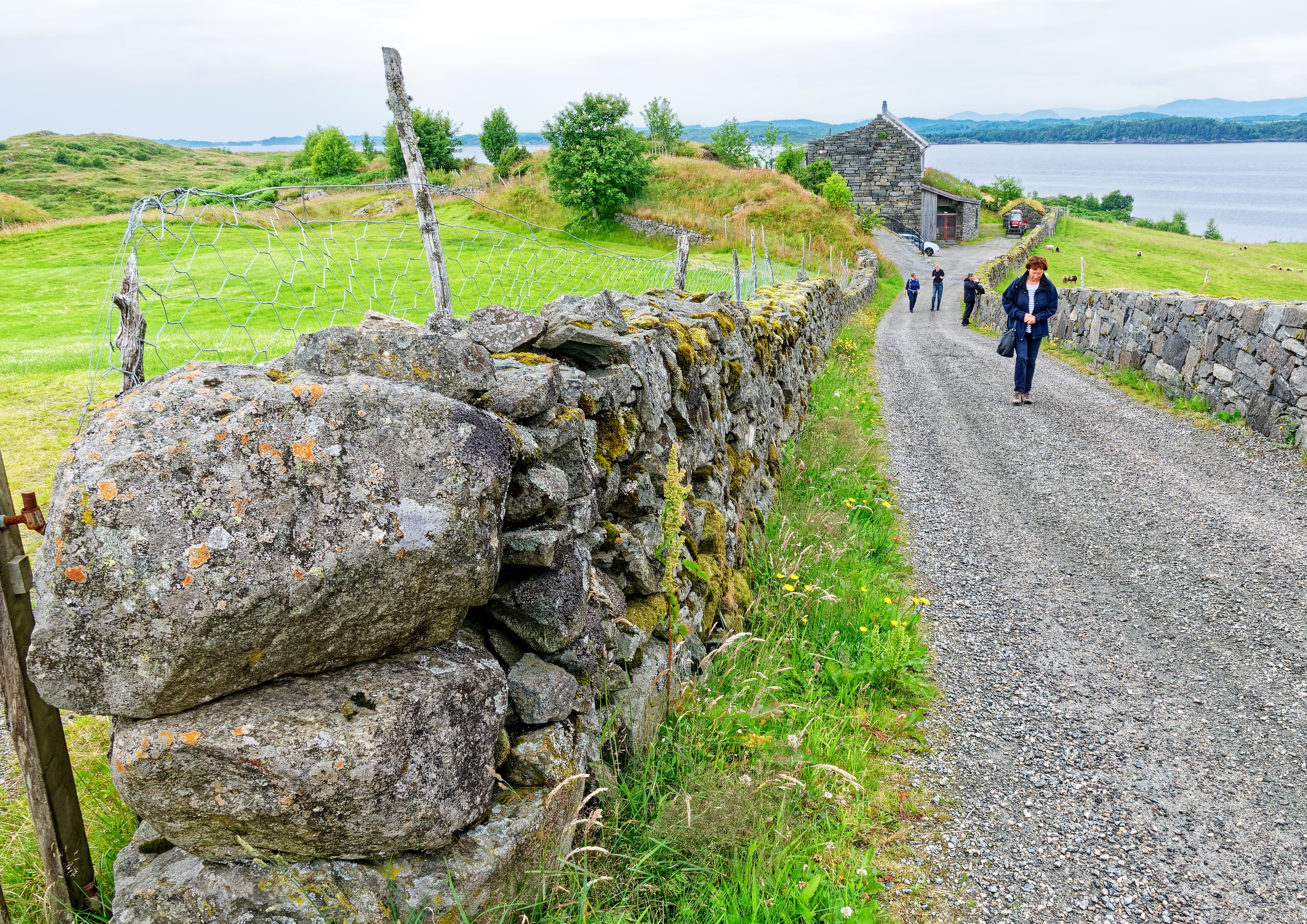
Natural stone walls on the way to the Heathland Center

== See also ==
- List of islands of Norway
