= Alversund Municipality =

Former municipality in Hordaland, Norway

Alversund Municipality Alversund herad
- Former municipality
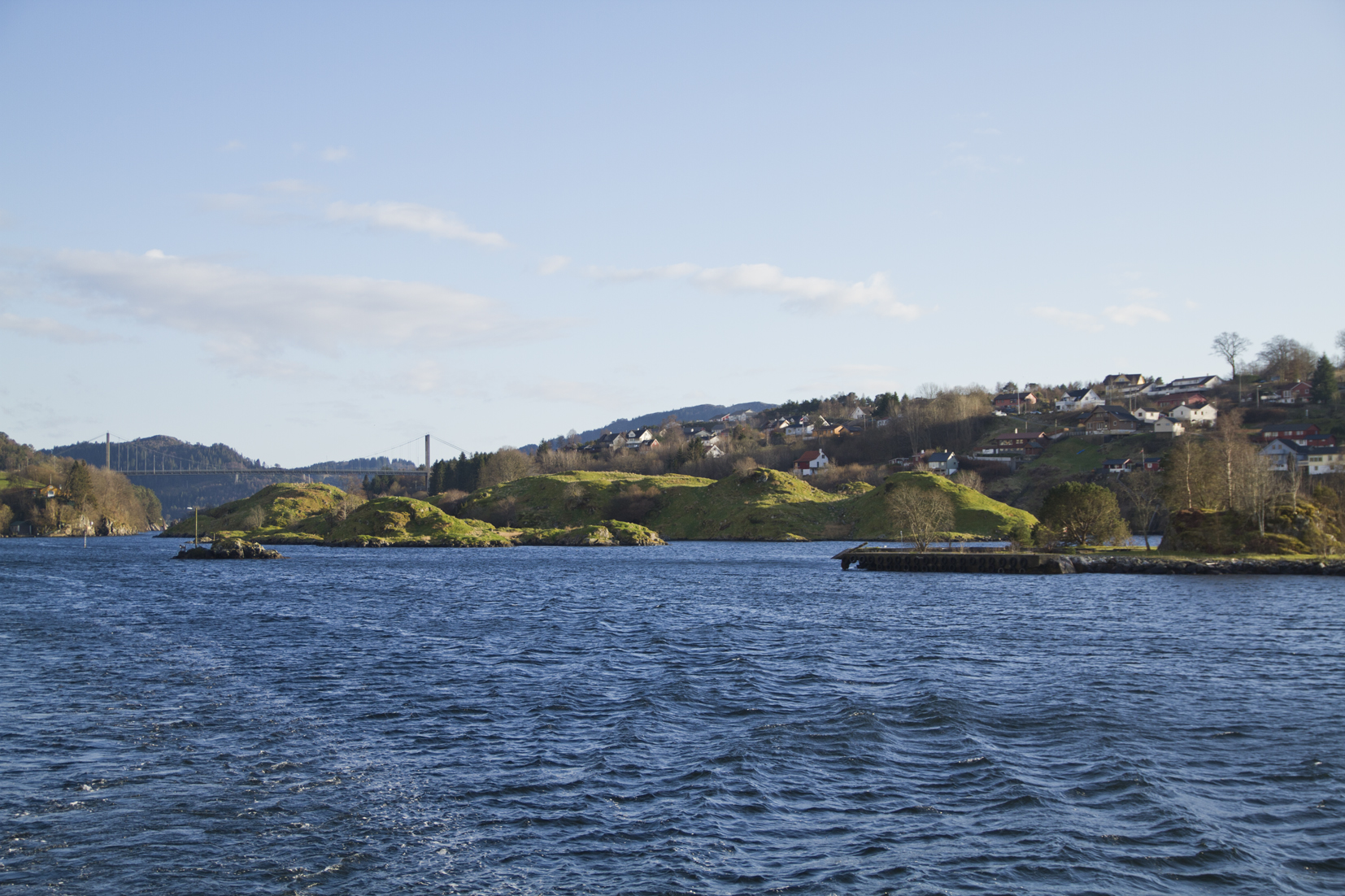
- Alversundet strait and bridge in the background

- Hordaland within Norway

- Alversund within Hordaland
- Coordinates: 60°34′19″N 05°13′59″E
- Country: Norway
- County: Hordaland
- District: Nordhordland
- Established: 1 Jan 1885
  - Preceded by: Hammer Municipality
- Disestablished: 1 Jan 1964
  - Succeeded by: Lindås Municipality
- Administrative centre: Alversund

Government
  - Mayor (1956 1963): Sverre Fosse

Area (upon dissolution)
  - Total: 59.01 km^{2} (22.78 sq mi)
  - Rank: #580 in Norway
- Highest elevation: 288 m (945 ft)

Population (1963)
  - Total: 2,081
  - Rank: #422 in Norway
  - Density: 35.3/km^{2} (91/sq mi)
  - Change (10 years): ▲ +5.4%

Official language
  - Norwegian form: Nynorsk
- Time zone: UTC+01:00 (CET)
  - Summer (DST): UTC+02:00 (CEST)
- ISO 3166 code: NO-1257

Alversund is a former municipality in the old Hordaland county, Norway. The 59-square-kilometre (23 sq mi) municipality existed from 1885 until its dissolution in 1964. The area is now part of Alver Municipality in the traditional district of Nordhordland in Vestland county. The administrative centre was the village of Alversund, where Alversund Church is located.

Prior to its dissolution in 1964, the 59.1-square-kilometre (22.8 sq mi) municipality was the 580th largest by area out of the 689 municipalities in Norway. Alversund Municipality was the 422nd most populous municipality in Norway with a population of about 2,081. The municipality's population density was 35.3 inhabitants per square kilometre (91/sq mi) and its population had increased by 5.4% over the previous 10-year period.

== General information ==
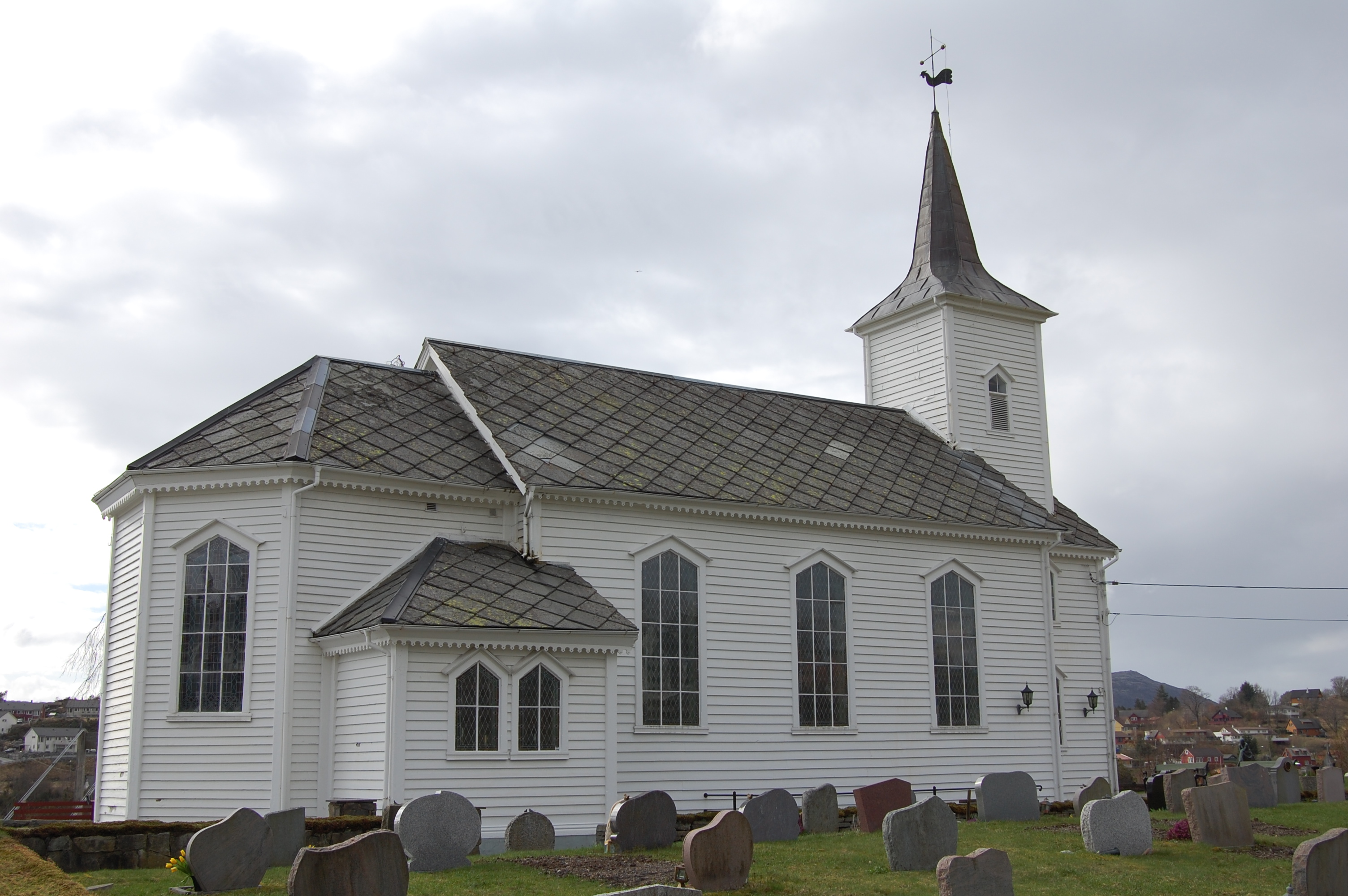
View of the main church for the municipality, Alversund Church

The municipality of Alversund was established on 1 January 1885 when the old Hammer Municipality was divided into two separate municipalities: the northwestern part (population: 2,793) became the new Alversund Municipality and the rest (population: 3,737) remained as a now-smaller Hammer Municipality. On the same date, the exclave of Seim which had been a part of Hosanger Municipality before that time became part of Hammer Municipality.

On 1 January 1904, a small area near Hanevik on the island of Askøy (population: 32) was transferred from Askøy Municipality to Alversund Municipality. On 15 October 1923, the western district of Alversund Municipality (population: 1716) was separated to form the new Meland Municipality. This left Alversund Municipality with 1,771 residents.

During the 1960s, there were many municipal mergers across Norway due to the work of the Schei Committee. On 1 January 1964, Alversund Municipality was dissolved and the following areas were merged to form a new, larger Lindås Municipality:

- all of Alversund Municipality (population: 2,099)
- most of Lindås Municipality (population: 3,651), except for the Sletta area that went to Radøy Municipality and the Einestrand, Eikebotn, and Kikallen farm areas that became part of Masfjorden Municipality
- all of Hamre Municipality that was located north of the Osterfjorden (population: 1,240)
- all of Hosanger Municipality that was located north of the Osterfjorden (population: 791)
- the Nipo, Dyrkelbotn, and Eitrdalen farm areas of Modalen Municipality (population: 12)
- the Titland area of Sæbø Municipality (population: 40)

=== Name ===
The municipality (originally the parish) is named after the old Alver farm (Old Norse: Alviðra) since the first Alversund Church was built there. The first element is a compound word derived from allr which means "all" or "entire" and the other part comes from veðr which means "weather". Thus the farm name means "all weather" or "weather from all directions"–describing a farm with an exposed and unsheltered location. The last element of the name is sund which means "sound" or "strait", referring to the nearby Alverstraumen strait.

=== Churches ===
The Church of Norway had one parish (sokn) within Alversund Municipality. At the time of the municipal dissolution, it was part of the Alversund prestegjeld and the Nordhordland prosti (deanery) in the Diocese of Bjørgvin.

Churches in Alversund Municipality
Parish (sokn)	Church name	Location of the church	Year built
Alversund	Alversund Church	Alversund	1879

== Geography ==
Alversund Municipality included land on the southern tip of the island of Radøy plus land on the mainland. It originally included area on the island of Holsnøy as well, but that was later transferred to Meland Municipality. The highest point in the municipality was the 288-metre (945 ft) tall mountain Vassberget.

Lindås Municipality was located to the north, Hamre Municipality was located to the east and south, Meland Municipality was located to the southwest, and Sæbø Municipality was located to the northwest.

== Government ==
While it existed, Alversund Municipality was responsible for primary education (through 10th grade), outpatient health services, senior citizen services, welfare and other social services, zoning, economic development, and municipal roads and utilities. The municipality was governed by a municipal council of directly elected representatives. The mayor was indirectly elected by a vote of the municipal council. The municipality was under the jurisdiction of the Gulating Court of Appeal.

=== Municipal council ===
The municipal council (Heradsstyre) of Alversund Municipality was made up of 17 representatives that were elected to four year terms. The tables below show the historical composition of the council by political party.

Alversund heradsstyre 1959–1963
Party name (in Nynorsk)	Number of representatives
Local List(s) (Lokale lister)	17
Total number of members:	17

Alversund heradsstyre 1955–1959
Party name (in Nynorsk)	Number of representatives
Labour Party (Arbeidarpartiet)	3
Liberal Party (Venstre)	3
Local List(s) (Lokale lister)	11
Total number of members:	17

Alversund heradsstyre 1951–1955
Party name (in Nynorsk)	Number of representatives
Labour Party (Arbeidarpartiet)	4
Liberal Party (Venstre)	3
Joint List(s) of Non-Socialist Parties (Borgarlege Felleslister)	7
Local List(s) (Lokale lister)	2
Total number of members:	16

Alversund heradsstyre 1947–1951
Party name (in Nynorsk)	Number of representatives
Labour Party (Arbeidarpartiet)	1
Local List(s) (Lokale lister)	15
Total number of members:	16

Alversund heradsstyre 1945–1947
Party name (in Nynorsk)	Number of representatives
Labour Party (Arbeidarpartiet)	3
Liberal Party (Venstre)	2
Local List(s) (Lokale lister)	11
Total number of members:	16

Alversund heradsstyre 1937–1941*
Party name (in Nynorsk)	Number of representatives
Labour Party (Arbeidarpartiet)	3
Liberal Party (Venstre)	3
List of workers, fishermen, and small farmholders (Arbeidarar, fiskarar, småbrukarar liste)	2
Joint List(s) of Non-Socialist Parties (Borgarlege Felleslister)	2
Local List(s) (Lokale lister)	6
Total number of members:	16
Note: Due to the German occupation of Norway during World War II, no elections were held for new municipal councils until after the war ended in 1945.

=== Mayors ===
The mayor (Nynorsk: ordførar) of Alversund Municipality was the political leader of the municipality and the chairperson of the municipal council. The following people held this position:

- 1886–1889: Ivar J. Hopland
- 1890–1891: Ole N. Rydland
- 1892–1897: Nils L. Seim
- 1898–1898: Nils K. Hjelmtveit
- 1899–1901: Askild E. Alver
- 1902–1910: Nils K. Hjelmtveit
- 1910–1916: Lars Nilssen Seim (V)
- 1917–1934: Karl A. Elsås
- 1935–1937: Karl N. Hjelmtveit
- 1938–1945: Sigvard L. Hopsdal
- 1945–1946: Hans Karolus Ommedal (KrF)
- 1946–1947: Nils H. Herland
- 1948–1951: Knut L. Sellevold
- 1952–1955: Wilhelm Tvedt
- 1956–1963: Sverre Fosse

== See also ==
- List of former municipalities of Norway
