= Meland =

Meland may refer to:

== Places ==
- Meland Municipality, a former municipality in the old Hordaland county, Norway
- Meland (village), a village in Alver Municipality in Vestland county, Norway
- Meland Church, a church in Alver Municipality in Vestland county, Norway
- Meland, Bømlo, a village in Bømlo Municipality in Vestland county, Norway
- Meland, Hægebostad, a village in Hægebostad Municipality in Agder county, Norway
- Meland, Kvinesdal, a village in Kvinesdal Municipality in Agder county, Norway

== See also ==
- Meland (surname), a list of people with the surname Meland
