= Alversund Bridge =

Alversund Bridge Alversund bru
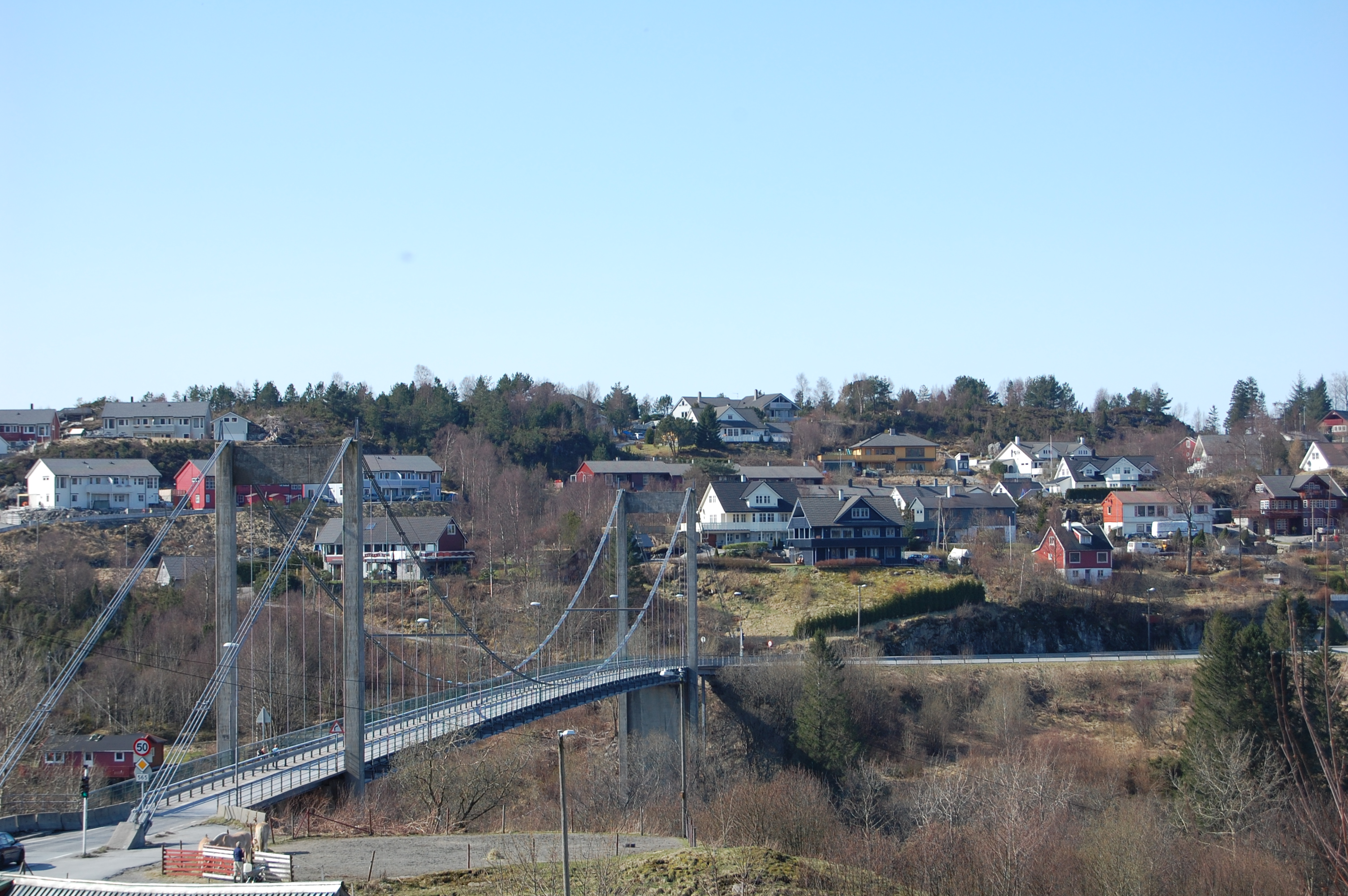
- View of the bridge
- Coordinates: 60.5711°N 5.2291°E
- Carries: Fv565
- Crosses: Alverstraumen strait
- Locale: Alver Municipality, Norway

Characteristics
- Longest span: 198 metres (650 ft)
- Clearance below: 27 metres (89 ft)

History
- Opened: 29 June 1958

Location
- Interactive map of Alversund Bridge

The Alversund Bridge (Norwegian: Alversund bru) is a suspension bridge spanning the Alverstraumen, a narrow strait between the island of Radøy and the mainland in the village of Alversund in Alver Municipality in Vestland county, Norway. The bridge was opened for traffic on 29 June 1958. The Alversund bridge was the first toll bridge collaboration project between the municipalities in the region of Nordhordland. The bridge's main span is 198 metres (650 ft) and the maximum clearance to the sea is 27 metres (89 ft).

It was decided that even when the bridge was paid for in 1968, the toll fees would continue as a prepayment for the planned Nordhordland Bridge (opened in 1994).
