= Hjartås =

Village in Alver Municipality, Norway

- Village
- Interactive map of Hjartås
- Coordinates: 60.52972°N 5.14694°E
- Country: Norway
- Region: Western Norway
- County: Vestland
- District: Nordhordland
- Municipality: Alver Municipality
- Elevation: 46 m (151 ft)
- Time zone: UTC+01:00 (CET)
  - Summer (DST): UTC+02:00 (CEST)
- Post Code: 5918 Frekhaug

Hjartås is a village in Alver Municipality in Vestland county, Norway. The village lies along the Herdlefjorden on the western coast of the island of Holsnøy.

The village is a part of the urban area of Holme. The 0.57-square-kilometre (140-acre) urban area of Holme (which includes Hjartås) has a population (2025) of 920, giving the village a population density of 1,614 inhabitants per square kilometre (4,180/sq mi).
