= Alversund =

Village in Alver Municipality, Norway

- Village
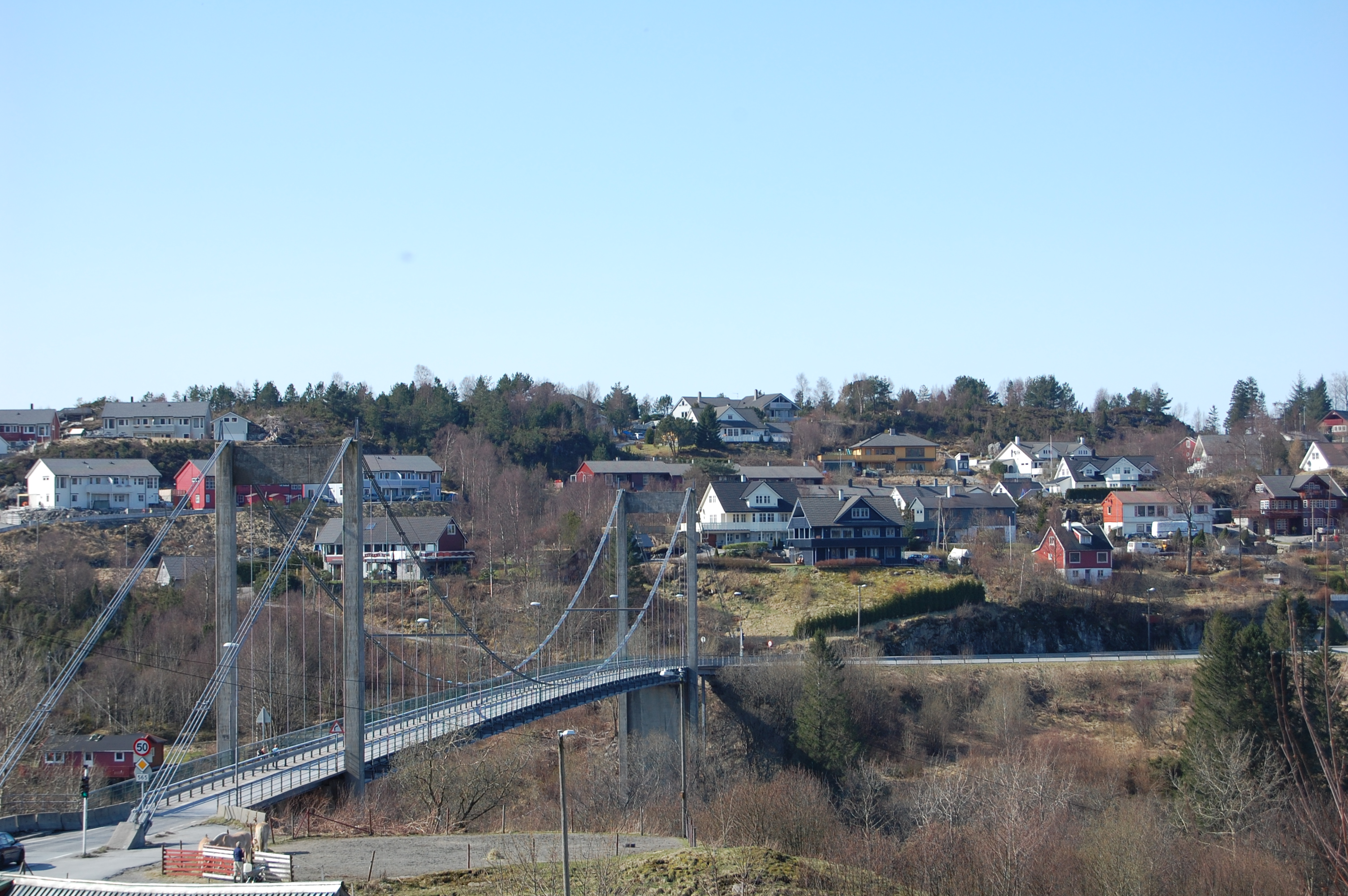
- View of the village area
- Interactive map of Alversund
- Coordinates: 60.57095°N 5.23495°E
- Country: Norway
- Region: Western Norway
- County: Vestland
- District: Nordhordland
- Municipality: Alver Municipality
- Elevation: 43 m (141 ft)
- Time zone: UTC+01:00 (CET)
  - Summer (DST): UTC+02:00 (CEST)
- Post Code: 5911 Alversund

Alversund is a village in Alver Municipality in Vestland county, Norway. The village is located on the mainland of the Lindås peninsula, along the shore of the Alverstraumen strait. The village sits between the villages of Alverstraumen (across the strait) and Alver (to the south), forming a large village area that is often referred to as Alversund.

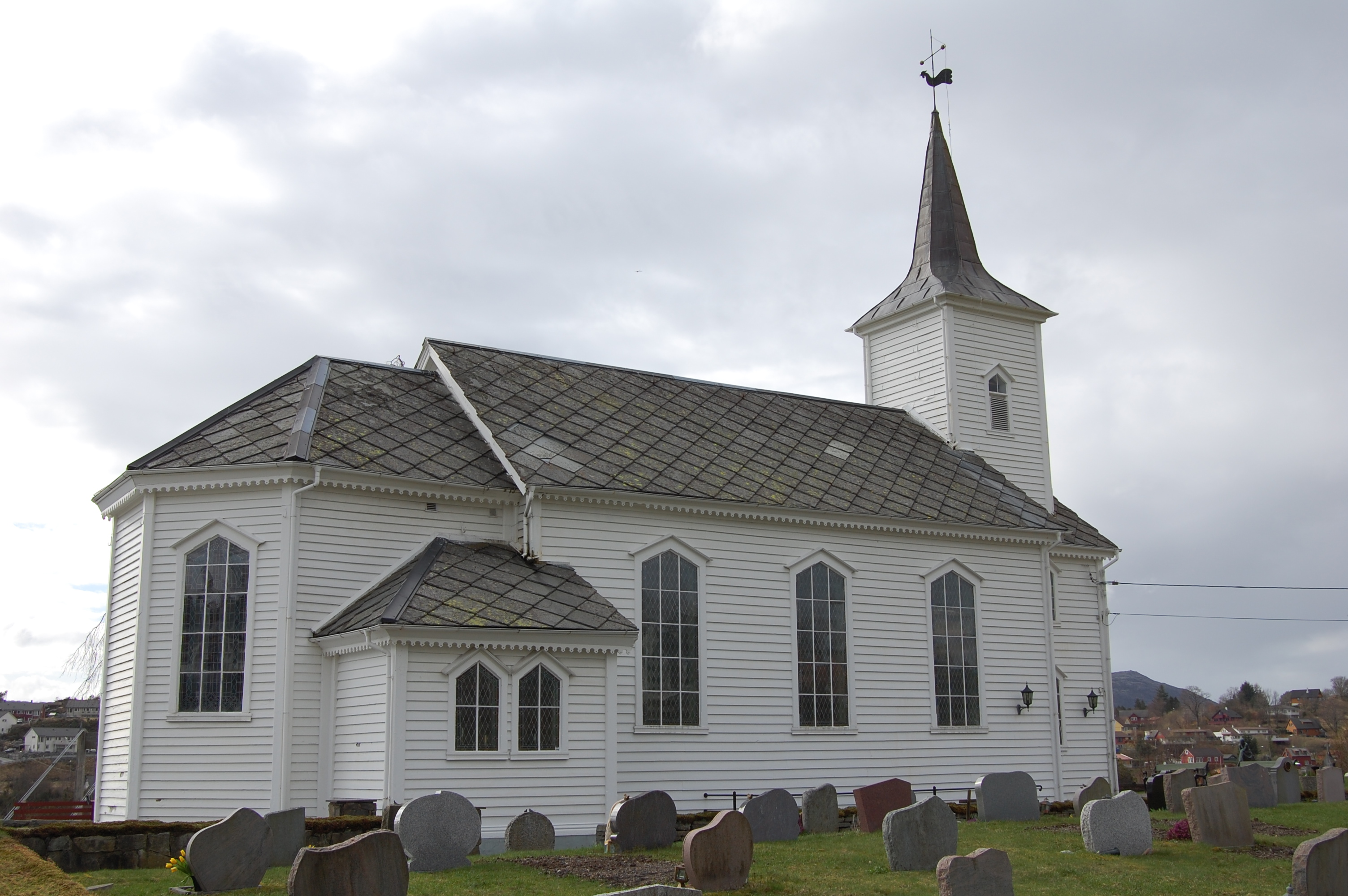
Alversund Church

The Alversund Bridge spans the Alverstraumen strait between Alversund and the village area of Alverstraumen located on the southern tip of the island of Radøy, creating a vital connection between Radøy and the mainland. In Alversund there is a primary school with about 400 pupils. Alversund Church (Alversund kyrkje) dates from 1879 and it is located in the village, along the main road. It was built of wood and has 200 seats.

== History ==
The village was the administrative centre of the old Alversund Municipality which existed from 1885 until 1964.

Among other things one will find Den Gamle Bokstova, a book café where a small group of people meets 6-8 times a year to discuss literature. The building dates from the 16th century and is a former bank, library, and community house.

=== Name ===
The municipality (originally the parish) is named after the old Alver farm (Old Norse: Alviðra) since the first church was built there. The meaning of the name is "all weather" (meaning "weather from all directions" - describing a farm with an exposed and unsheltered site). The last element is sund which means "sound" or "strait", referring to Alverstraumen strait.

== Notable people ==
- Ivar Medaas (1938–2005), a folksinger and fiddle player
- Hans Karolus Ommedal (1901–1984), a politician for the Christian Democratic Party
- Nils Hjelmtveit (1892–1985), an educator and politician for the Labour Party
