= Myking Church =

Church in Vestland, Norway

- Myking kyrkje
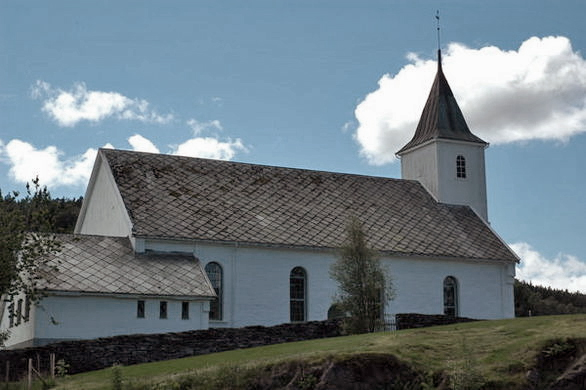
- View of the church
- Myking Church
- 60°42′00″N 5°19′31″E
- Location: Alver Municipality, Vestland
- Country: Norway
- Denomination: Church of Norway
- Previous denomination: Catholic Church
- Churchmanship: Evangelical Lutheran

History
- Status: Parish church
- Founded: 13th century
- Consecrated: 17 November 1861

Architecture
- Functional status: Active
- Architect: Christian Heinrich Grosch
- Architectural type: Long church
- Completed: 1861 (165 years ago)

Specifications
- Capacity: 250
- Materials: Stone

Administration
- Diocese: Bjørgvin bispedømme
- Deanery: Nordhordland prosti
- Parish: Lindås
- Norwegian Cultural Heritage Site
- Type: Church
- Status: Listed
- ID: 85077

Myking Church (Norwegian: Myking kyrkje) is a parish church of the Church of Norway in Alver Municipality in Vestland county, Norway. It is located in the village of Myking, along the inner Austfjorden. It is one of the three churches for the Lindås parish which is part of the Nordhordland prosti (deanery) in the Diocese of Bjørgvin. The white, stone church was built in a long church design in 1861 using plans drawn up by the architect Christian Heinrich Grosch. The church seats about 250 people.

== History ==
The earliest existing historical records of the church parish date back to the year 1360, but the church was likely built before that time. The first church was a wooden stave church that was possibly built during the 13th century. The church was originally located about 300 metres (980 ft) northwest of the present location. In 1606, the church was torn down and replaced by a new timber-framed building on a site that was very close to the old one. In the mid-1800s, it was decided to build a new church. It was the request of the villagers that the new church be built of stone from the surrounding area rather than a wood church, and it was also decided to move the location of the church. The new stone church was built about 300 metres (980 ft) southeast of the old church site, so that it was closer to the main village area. The new church was consecrated on 17 November 1861 by the local provost Hveding. For the 100th anniversary in 1961, the church underwent a major restoration, according to plans by architect Stensaker. The church received a small addition of a sacristy, a new floor, and new pews. The pulpit was restored, and insulation was added over the ceiling, in addition to new pieces of furniture.

== See also ==
- List of churches in Bjørgvin
