= Meland (village) =

Village in Alver Municipality, Norway

- Village
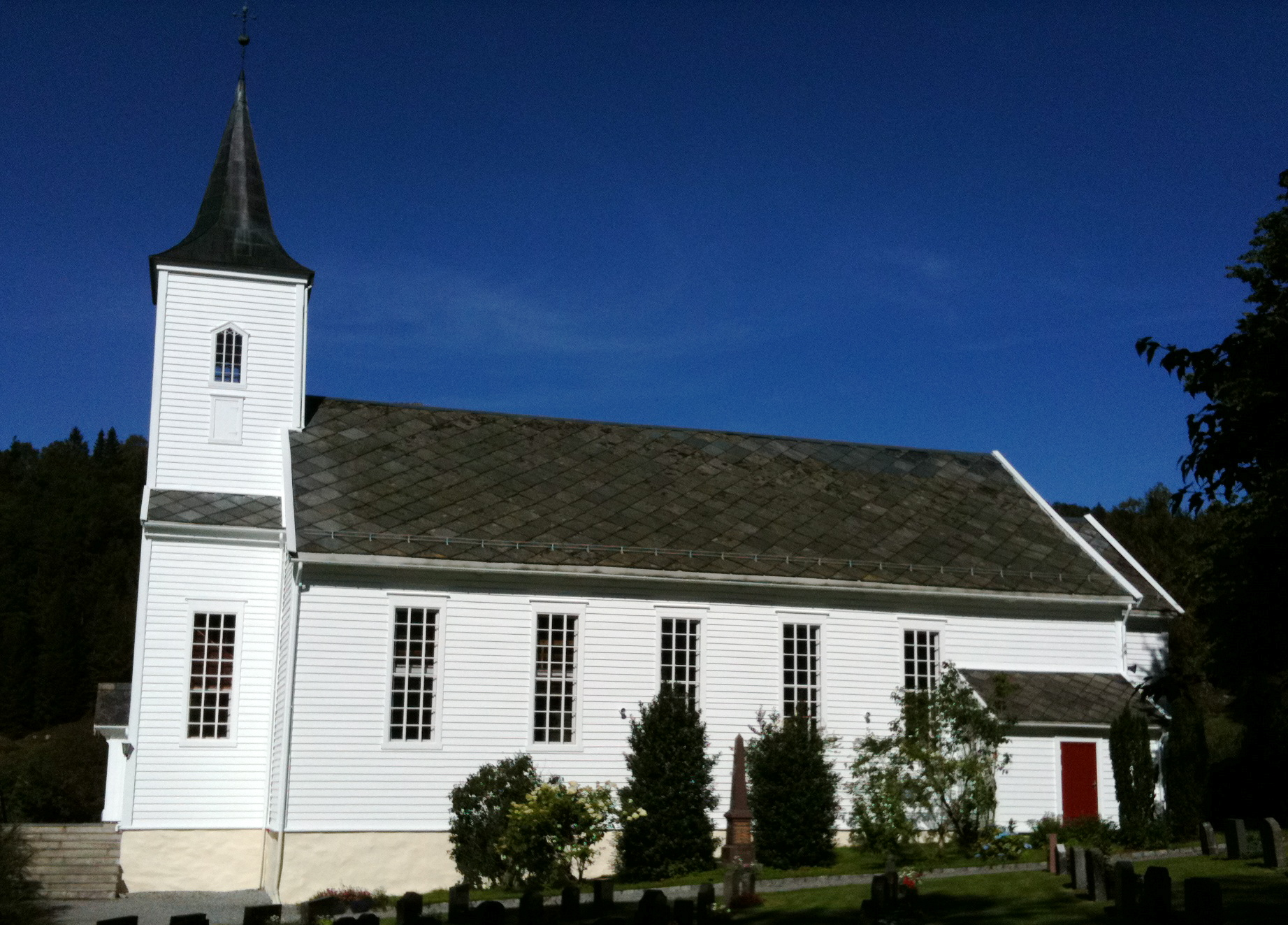
- View of the village
- Interactive map of Meland
- Coordinates: 60.54031°N 5.18761°E
- Country: Norway
- Region: Western Norway
- County: Vestland
- District: Nordhordland
- Municipality: Alver Municipality
- Elevation: 105 m (344 ft)
- Time zone: UTC+01:00 (CET)
  - Summer (DST): UTC+02:00 (CEST)
- Post Code: 5918 Frekhaug

Meland is a village in Alver Municipality in Vestland county, Norway. The village is located on the central part of the island of Holsnøy, about 3 kilometres (1.9 mi) northeast of the village of Holme and about 4 kilometres (2.5 mi) northwest of the village of Frekhaug. Meland Church is located in this village.
