= Hordabø Church =

Church in Vestland, Norway

- Hordabø kyrkje
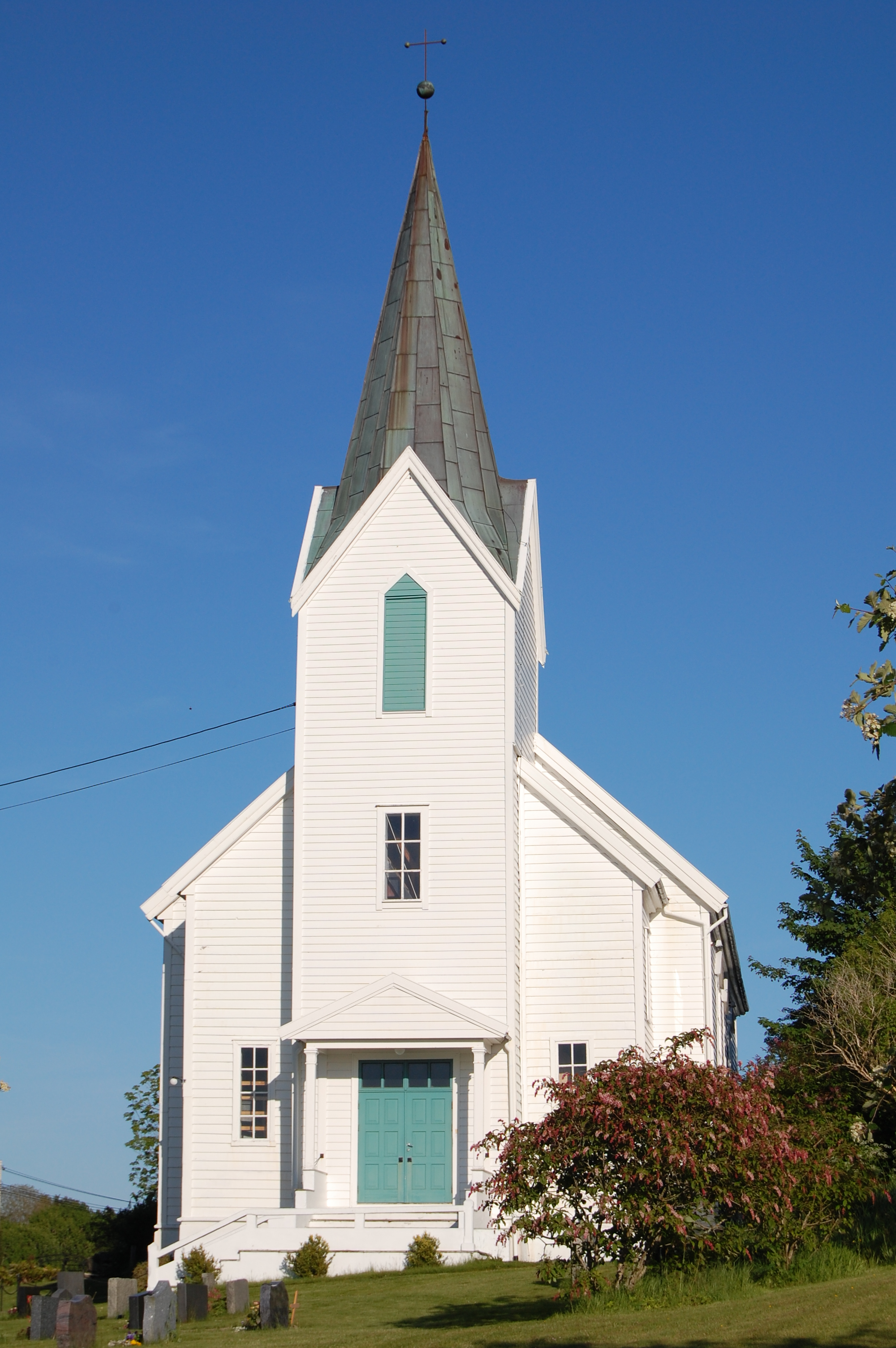
- View of the church
- Hordabø Church
- 60°41′51″N 4°55′41″E
- Location: Alver Municipality, Vestland
- Country: Norway
- Denomination: Church of Norway
- Previous denomination: Catholic Church
- Churchmanship: Evangelical Lutheran

History
- Former name: Bø kirke
- Status: Parish church
- Founded: 13th century
- Consecrated: 5 August 1875

Architecture
- Functional status: Active
- Architect: Jacob Wilhelm Nordan
- Architectural type: Long church
- Completed: 1875 (151 years ago)

Specifications
- Capacity: 330
- Materials: Wood

Administration
- Diocese: Bjørgvin bispedømme
- Deanery: Nordhordland prosti
- Parish: Radøy
- Norwegian Cultural Heritage Site
- Type: Church
- Status: Not protected
- ID: 84630

Hordabø Church (Norwegian: Hordabø kyrkje) is a parish church of the Church of Norway in Alver Municipality in Vestland county, Norway. It is located in the village of Bøvågen on the island of Radøy. It is one of the four churches in the Radøy parish which is part of the Nordhordland prosti (deanery) in the Diocese of Bjørgvin. The white, wooden church was built in a long church style in 1875 using designs by the architect Jacob Wilhelm Nordan. The church seats about 330 people.

== History ==
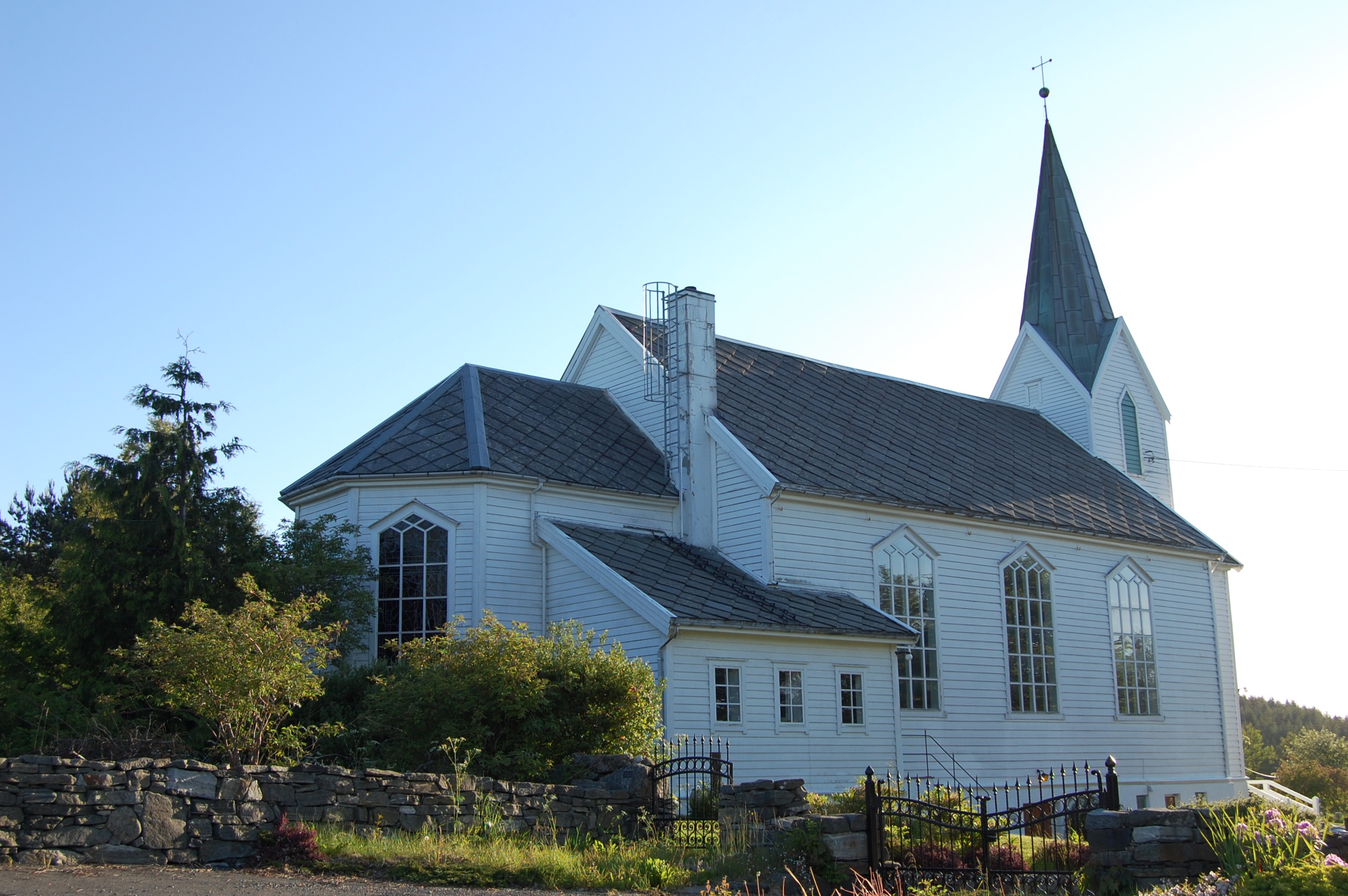
Rear view of the church

The earliest existing historical records of the church date back to the year 1350, but it was likely built before that time. The original church was a wooden stave church that was likely built during the 13th century. Originally, the church was known Bø kirke. In the early- to mid-1600s, the church was replaced in stages with a new timber-framed structure. First, the old nave was torn down and rebuilt and then afterwards, around 1640, the old choir was torn down and replaced. After this, the church was essentially brand new. Around the year 1719, the building was renovated, with a new floor, new roof, and a newly rebuilt tower. At this time, the nave was 12 by 9.5 metres (39 ft × 31 ft) and the choir measured 7.5 by 7.5 metres (25 ft × 25 ft). There was also a 4.4-by-4.4-metre (14 ft × 14 ft) church porch on the west end of the nave.

In 1721, the church was purchased from the state by the parish priest, Hans Withe, during the Norwegian church auction that the King held in order to raise money to pay off debts incurred during the Great Northern War. In 1823, the current owner was the Consul Janson from Bergen, and he carried out a number of repairs on the building. In 1833, the church was in poor condition, so the owner, Hermann Krohn, paid for more repairs on the building. In 1853, the church was restored again. This time, thee tower was repaired and the base of the tower incorporated into the nave so that benches could be placed in that space in order to fit more people in the church. In 1855, the entire roof of the nave was rebuilt and a new tower was erected. New, larger windows were installed throughout the church as well.

In 1871, the church was sold to the local municipal government. Soon after the municipal council decided the church needed to be replaced. The architect Jacob Wilhelm Nordan was hired to design the new building and Jon Jonsen Alvær was hired as the lead builder. In 1875, the old church was torn down and the new church was built on the same site. The new church was consecrated on 5 August 1875. In 1925, the name of the church was changed from Bø kirke to Hordabø kyrkje (there are a number of churches in Norway named Bø). The building underwent repairs and remodeling in 1949 using plans by the by architect Ole Halvorsen from Bergen.

== See also ==
- List of churches in Bjørgvin
- Jehmlich-Orgel in der Hordabø kyrkje
