= Meland (surname) =

Meland is a surname. Notable people with the surname include:

- Edward C. Meland (1866–1939), American educator, newspaper editor, and politician
- Eilef A. Meland (born 1947), Norwegian economist, university lecturer, and politician
- Gunnar Meland (born 1947), Norwegian curler
- Kaare Meland (1915–2002), Norwegian politician
- Per Meland (born 1972), Norwegian businessman and media entrepreneur
