= Alversund Church =

Church in Vestland, Norway

- Alversund kyrkje
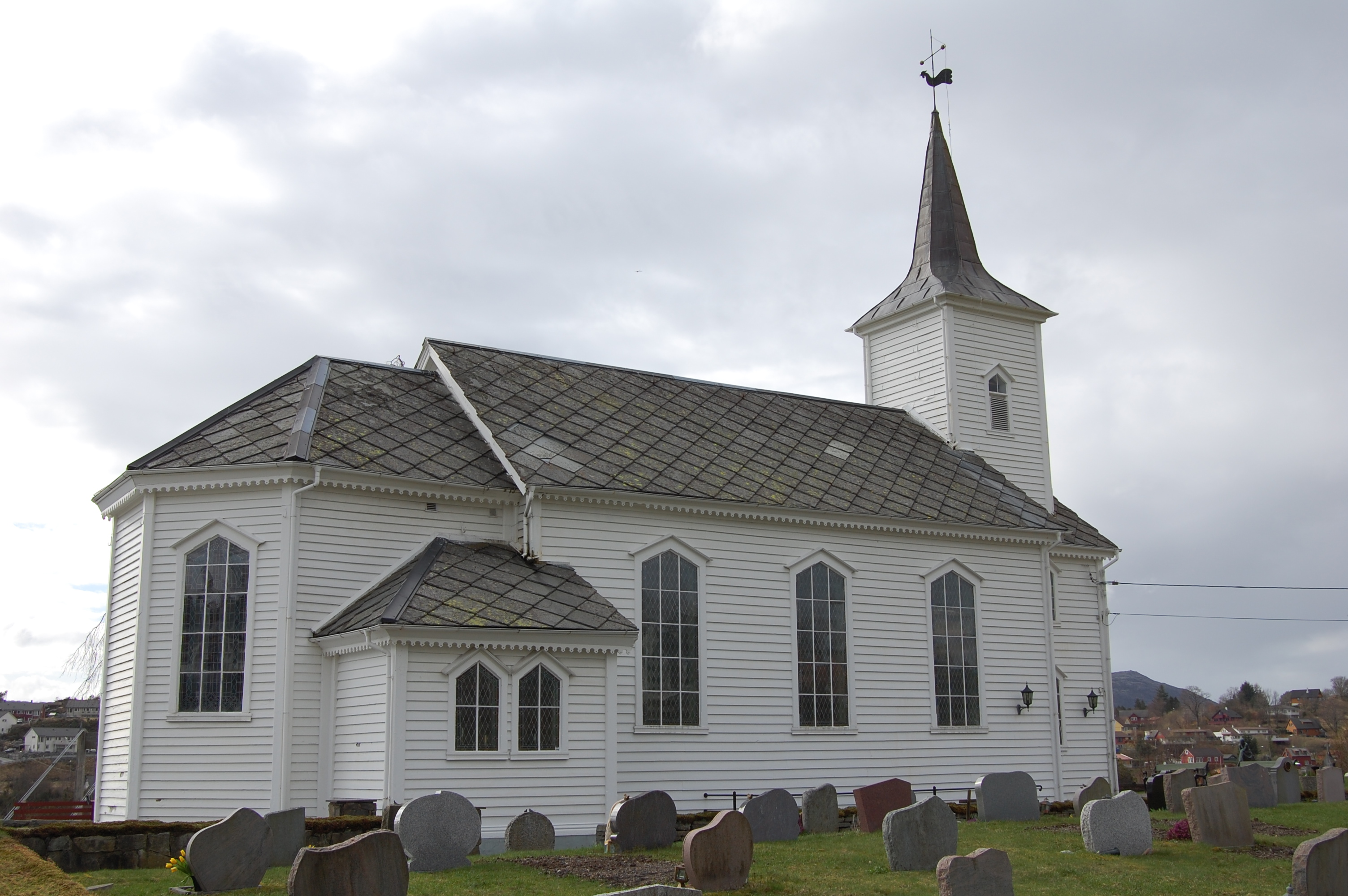
- View of the church
- Alversund Church
- 60°34′19″N 5°14′00″E
- Location: Alver Municipality, Vestland
- Country: Norway
- Denomination: Church of Norway
- Previous denomination: Catholic Church
- Churchmanship: Evangelical Lutheran

History
- Status: Parish church
- Founded: 12th century
- Consecrated: 27 May 1879

Architecture
- Functional status: Active
- Architect: Jon Jonsen Alvær
- Architectural type: Long church
- Completed: 1879 (147 years ago)

Specifications
- Capacity: 200
- Materials: Wood

Administration
- Diocese: Bjørgvin bispedømme
- Deanery: Nordhordland prosti
- Parish: Knarvik
- Norwegian Cultural Heritage Site
- Type: Church
- Status: Not protected
- ID: 83775

Alversund Church (Norwegian: Alversund kyrkje) is a parish church of the Church of Norway in Alver Municipality in Vestland county, Norway. It is located in the village of Alversund. It is one of the four churches for the Knarvik parish which is part of the Nordhordland prosti (deanery) in the Diocese of Bjørgvin. The white, wooden church was built in a long church design in 1879 using plans drawn up by the architect Jon Jonsen Alvær. The church seats about 200 people.

== History ==
The earliest existing historical records of the church date back to the year 1329, but it was not new that year. The priest, Righardt, from this church was mentioned in records from 1127. The first church was a wooden stave church that was likely first built during the 12th century. The church was torn down and replaced around the year 1629. The new church was a timber-framed long church structure and some of the materials from the old church were reused in the construction of the tower on the new church. Local oral tradition says that there was a painted inscription in the church that said the church was consecrated on the 2nd day of Pentecost in 1629 (25 May 1629). The building had a rectangular nave measuring 8.8 by 6.9 metres (29 ft × 23 ft) and a narrower, square chancel with a lower roof line that measured about 5.6 by 5.6 metres (18 ft × 18 ft). The church seated about 120 people. In the 1870s, the need for a new church was apparent. Jon Jonsen Alvær was hired to design the new church. Plans were drawn in 1872, and they were later revised before being approved in 1873. Foundation work began in 1875 and then a man named T. Tengesdal from Rogaland was hired as the lead builder in 1876. A new church was constructed immediately southeast of the old building and when it was completed, the old building was torn down. The new church was consecrated on 27 May 1879 by the Bishop Peter Hersleb Graah Birkeland.

== Media gallery ==
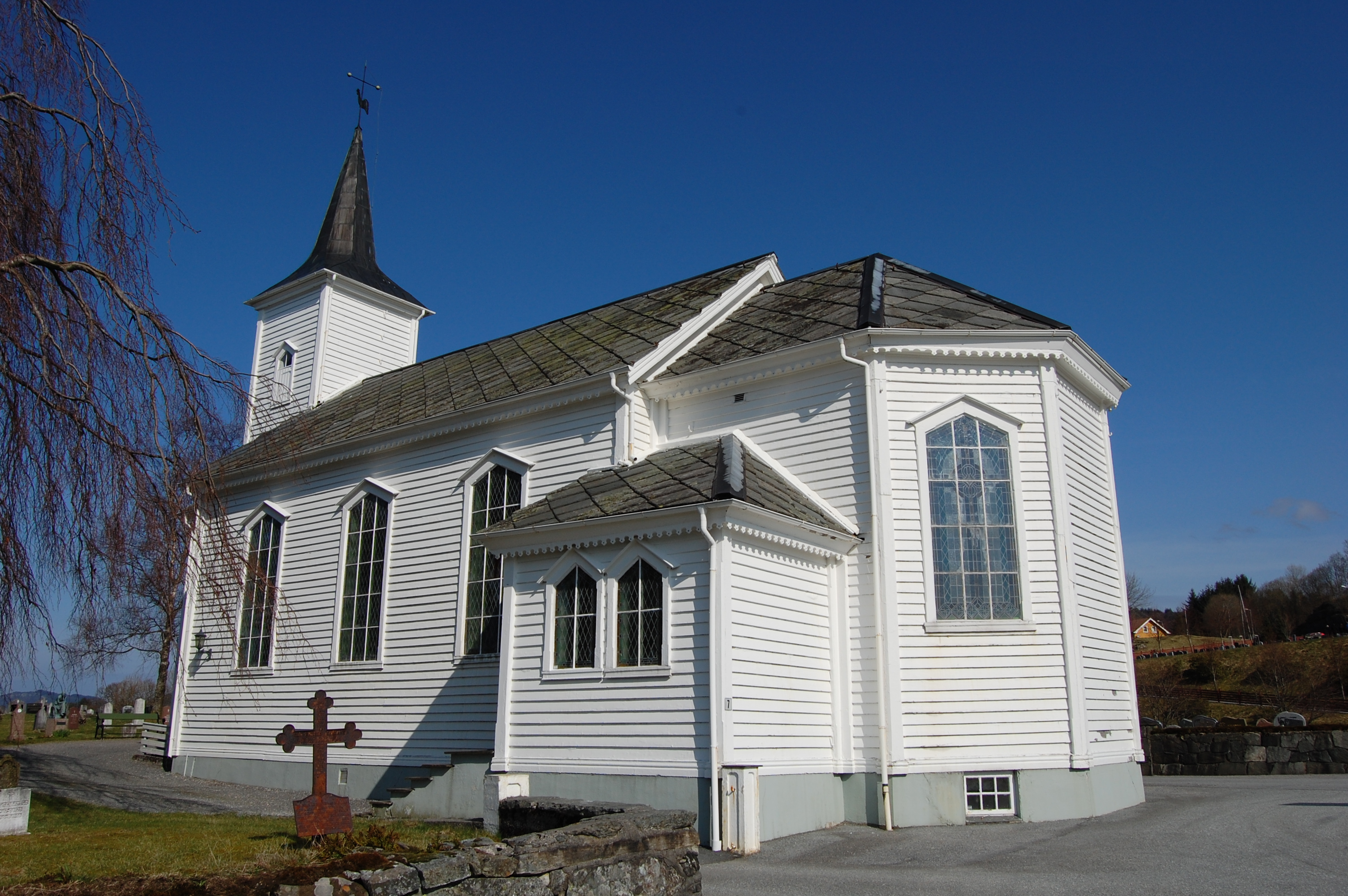

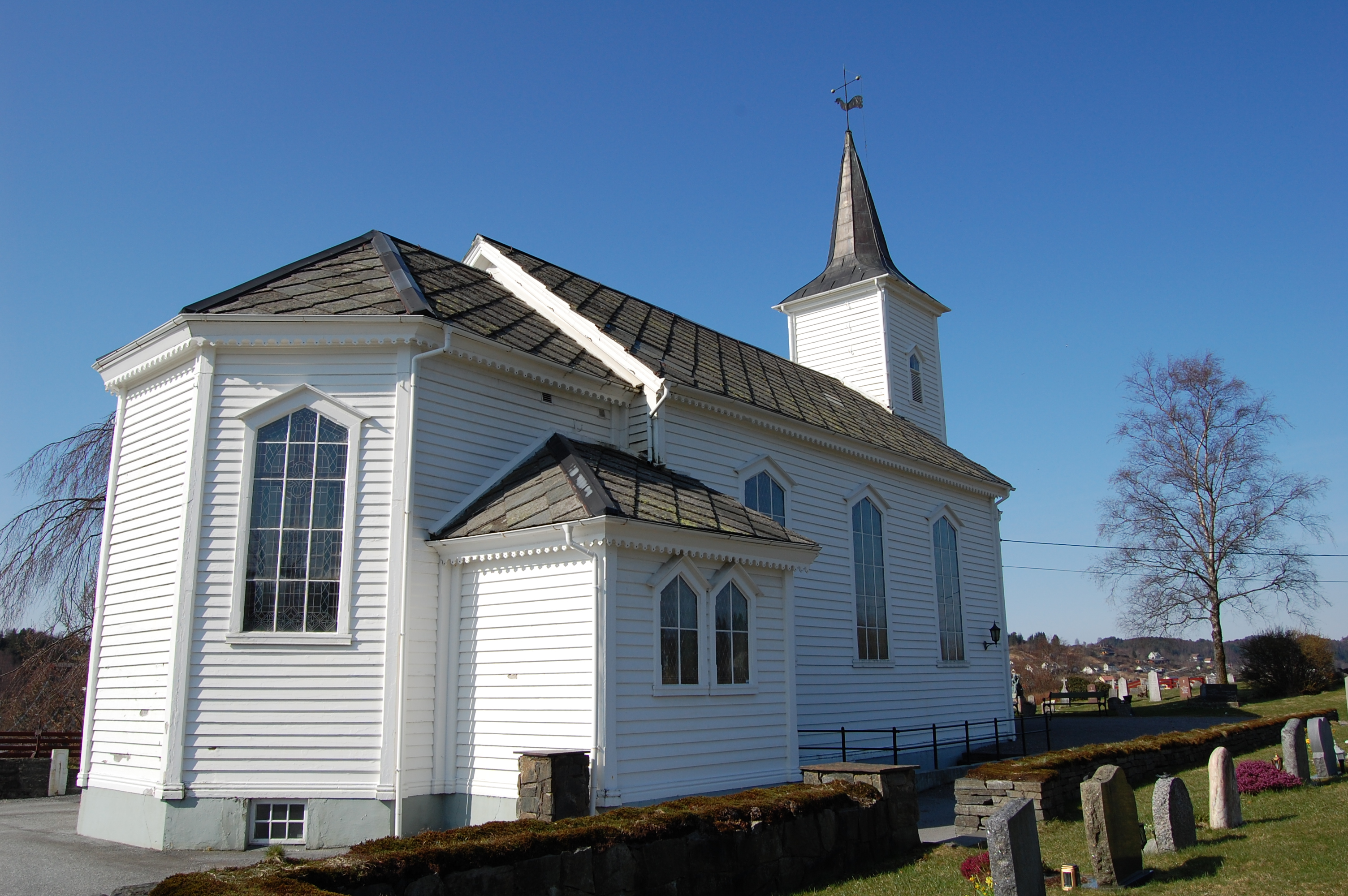

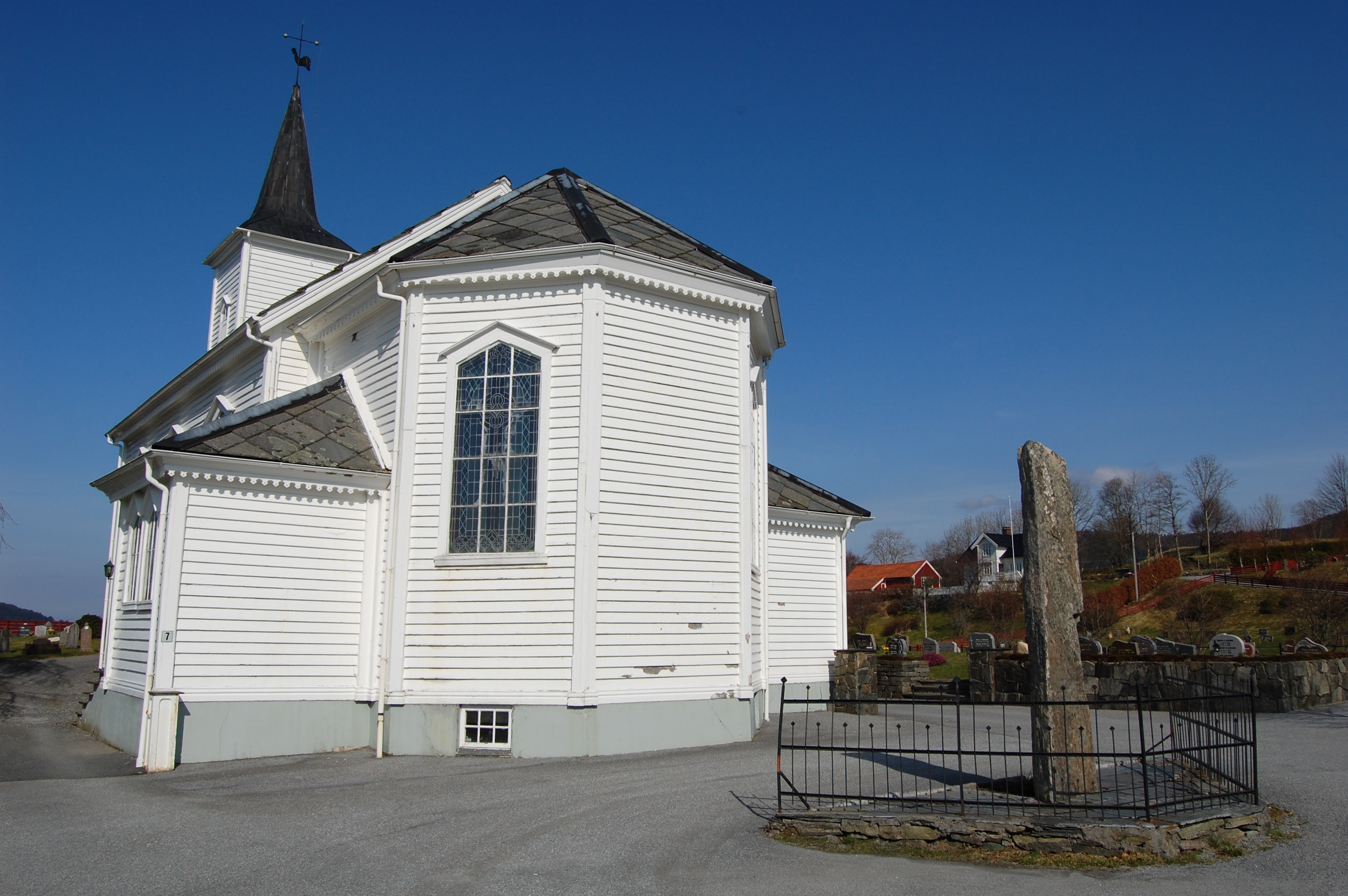

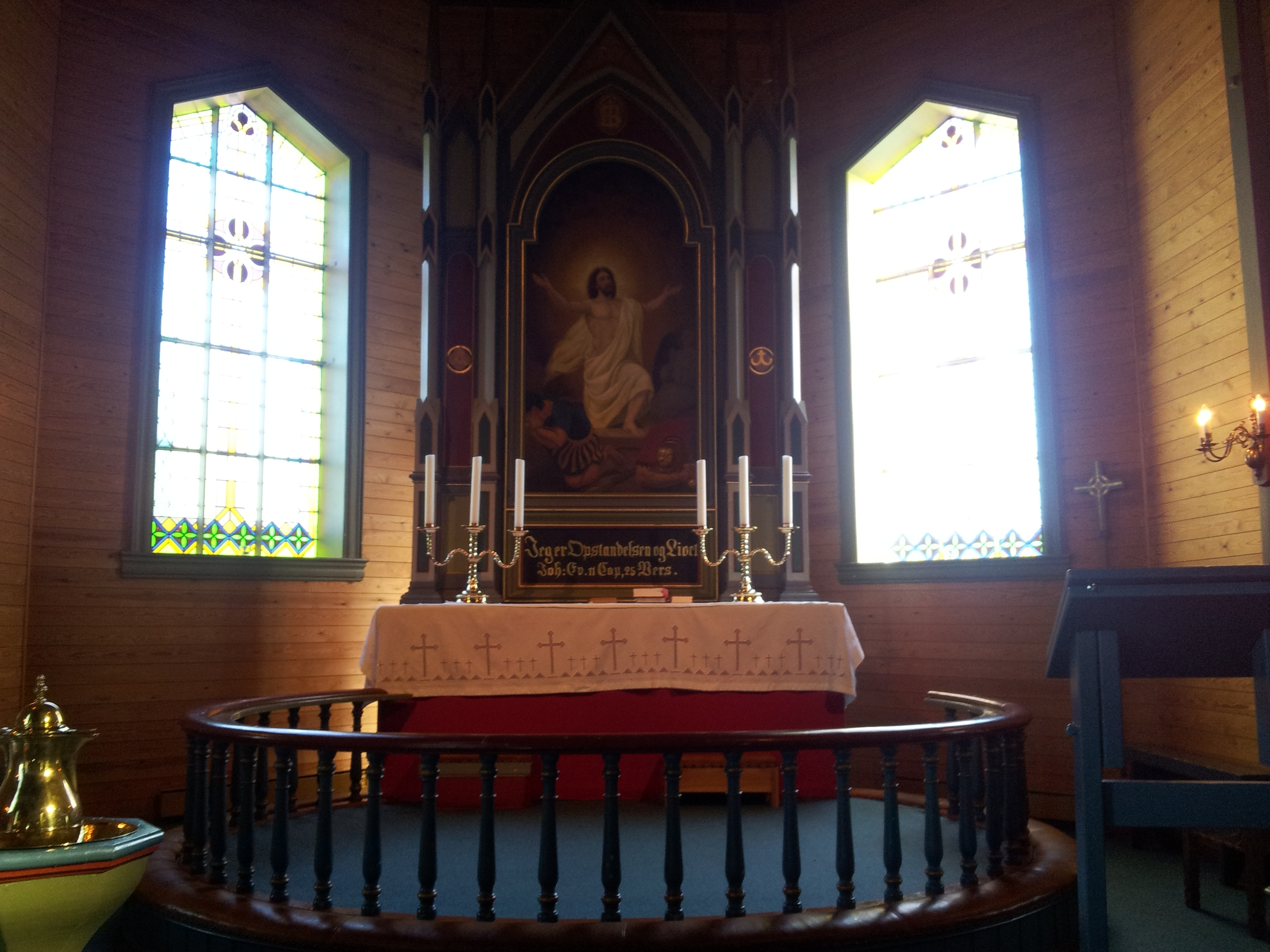

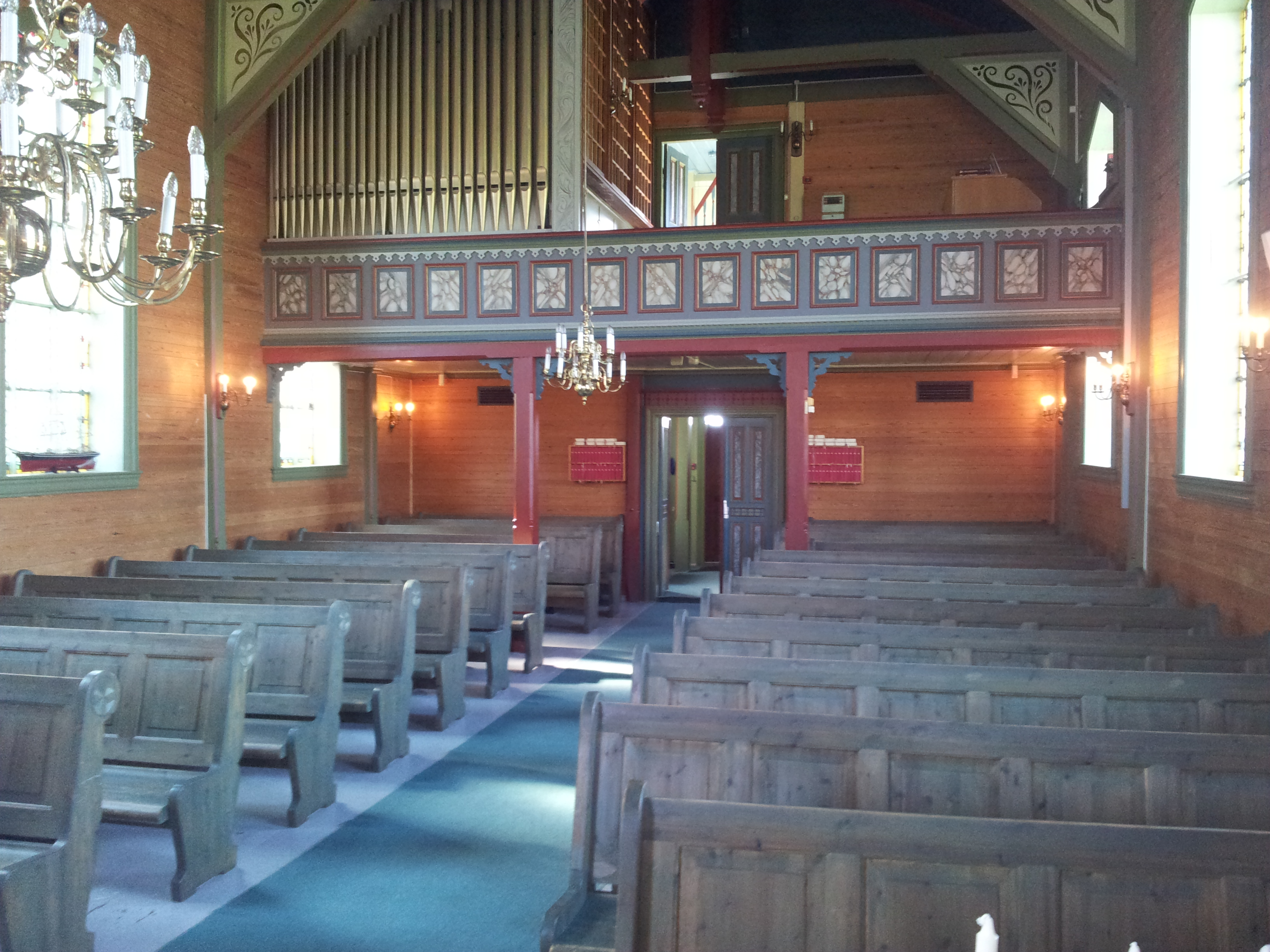

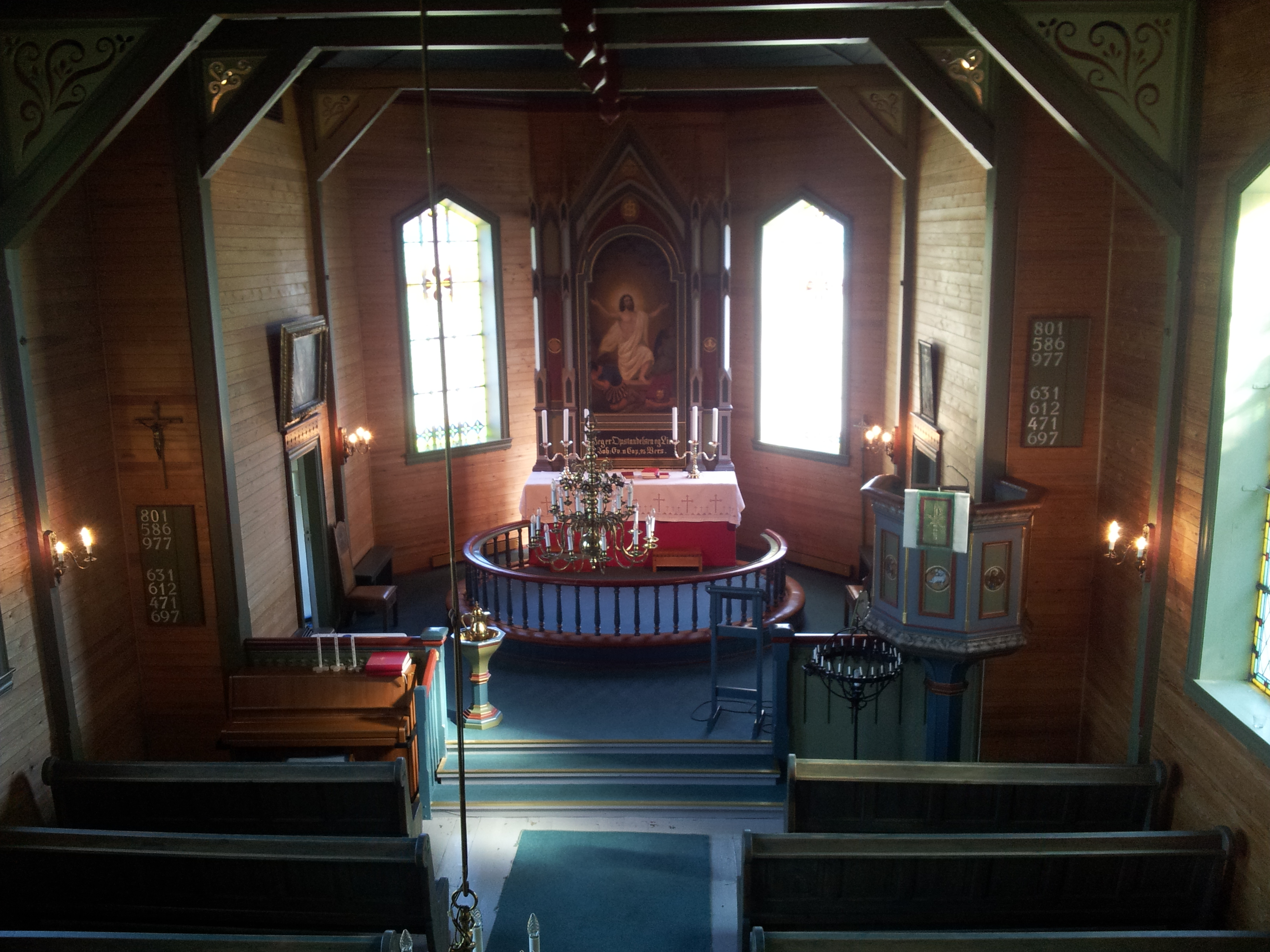

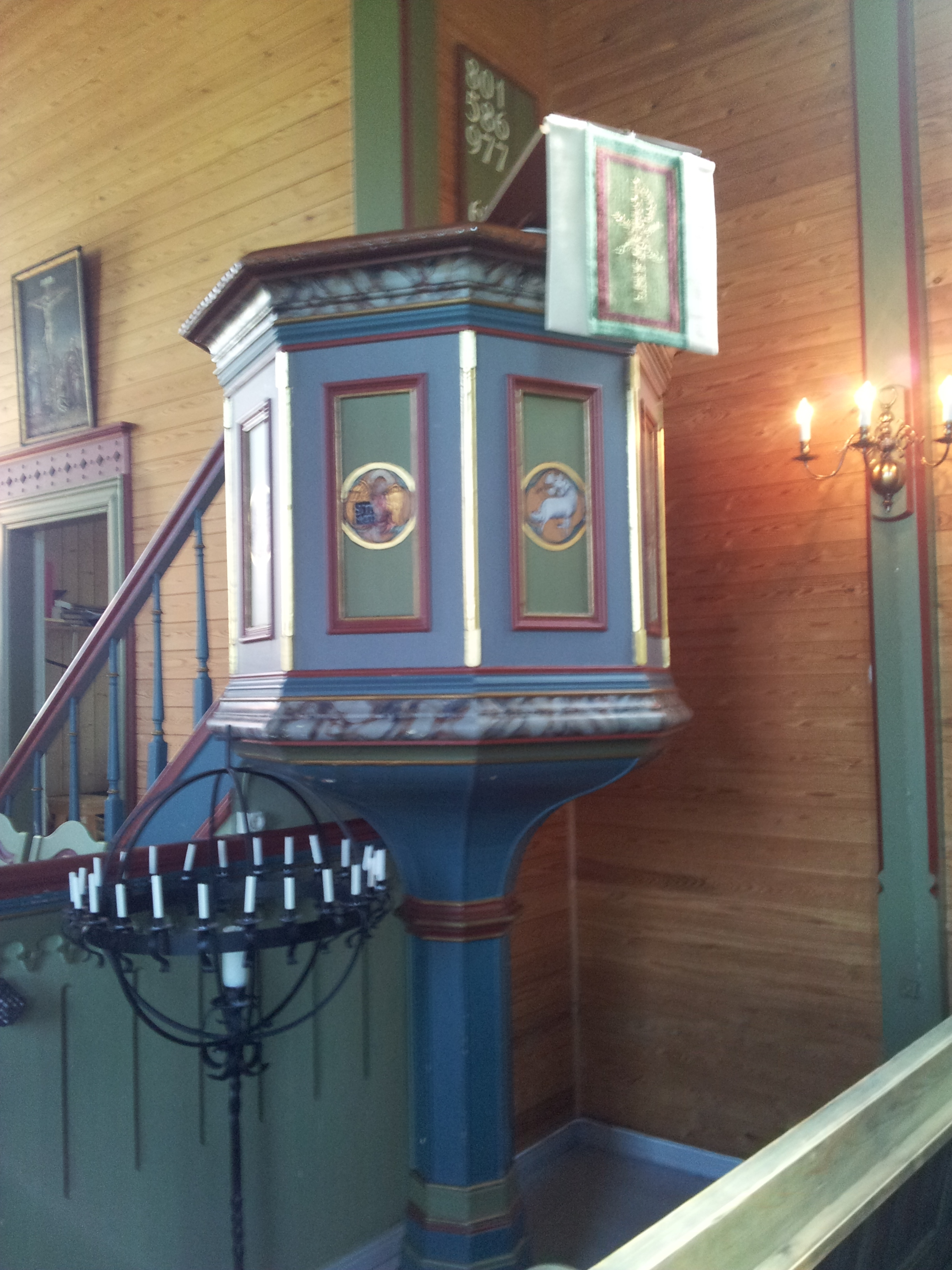

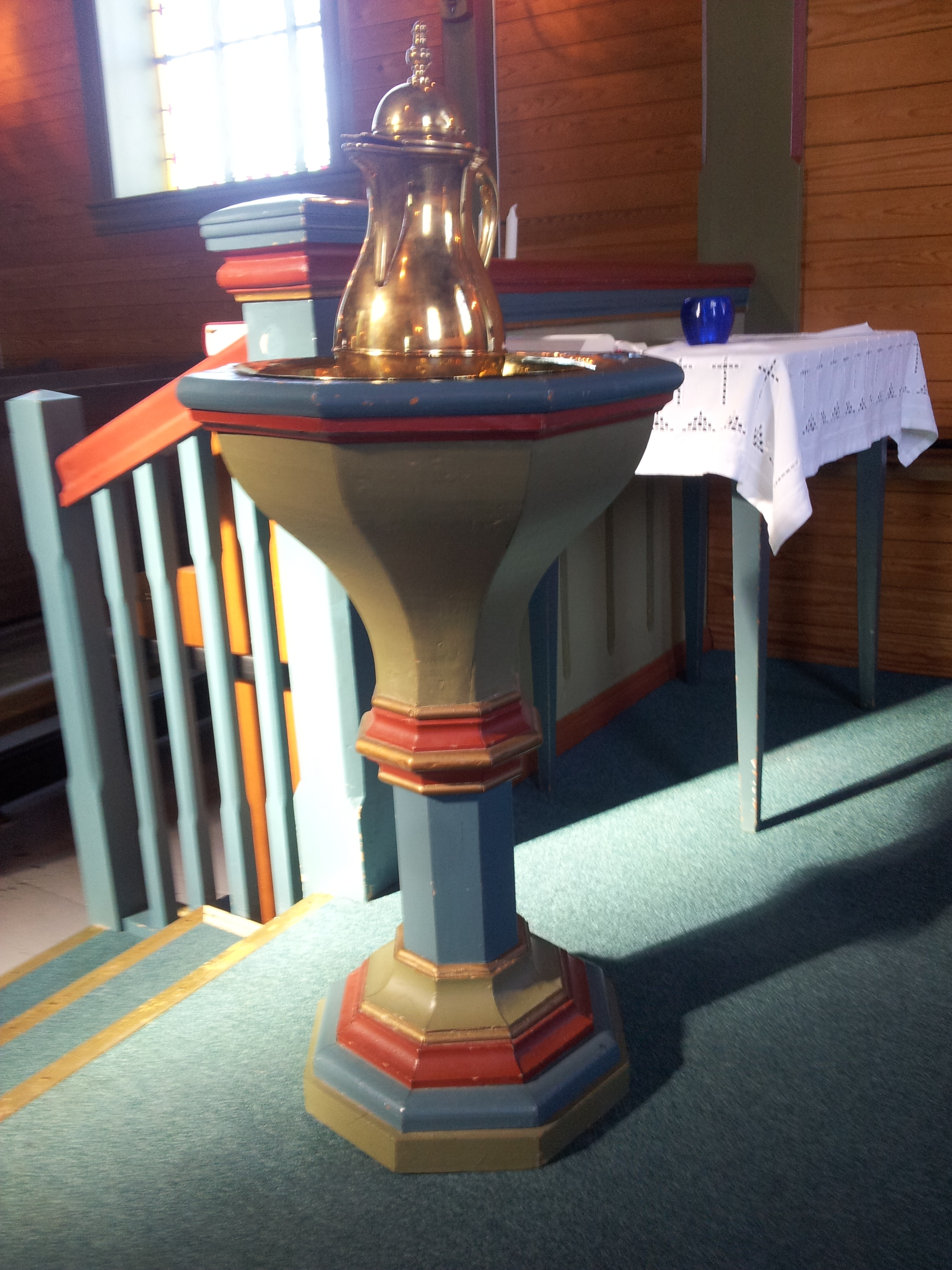

== See also ==
- List of churches in Bjørgvin
