= Alver, Norway =

Village in Alver Municipality, Norway

Alver
- Village
- Interactive map of Alver
- Coordinates: 60.56379°N 5.25235°E
- Country: Norway
- Region: Western Norway
- County: Vestland
- District: Nordhordland
- Municipality: Alver Municipality
- Elevation: 66 m (217 ft)
- Time zone: UTC+01:00 (CET)
  - Summer (DST): UTC+02:00 (CEST)
- Post Code: 5911 Alversund

Alver is a village in Alver Municipality in Vestland county, Norway. The village is located on the mainland of the Lindås peninsula, along the southern end of the Radfjorden. The village of Alversund lies immediately to the north of Alver and the village of Isdalstø lies immediately to the south of Alver. The notable Alver Hotel is located in this village.
