= Hans Karolus Ommedal =

Norwegian politician

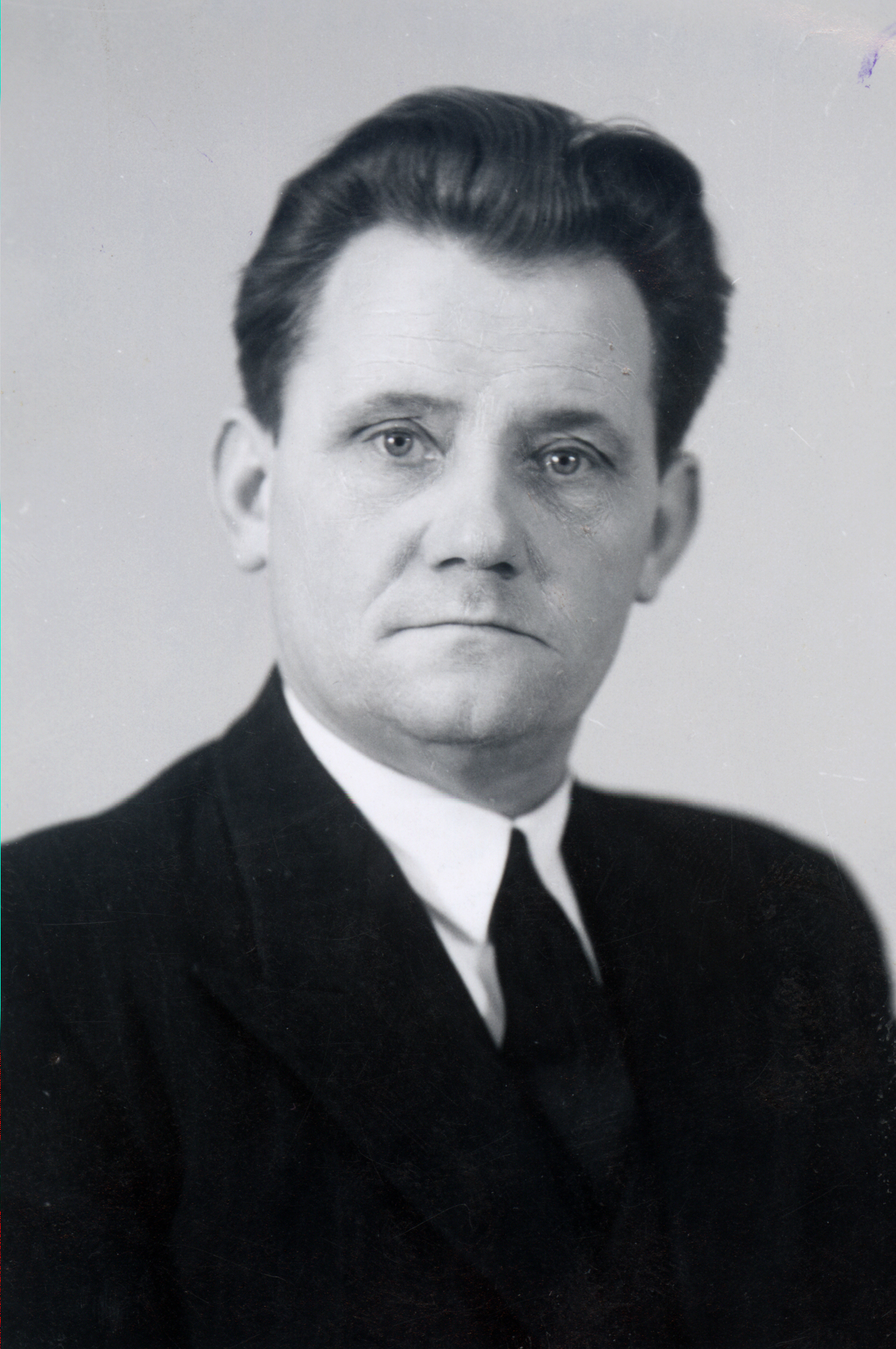

Hans Karolus Ommedal (16 January 1901 – 23 October 1984) was a Norwegian politician for the Christian Democratic Party.

He was born in Gloppen Municipality and was elected to the Norwegian Parliament from Sogn og Fjordane in 1954, and was re-elected on two occasions. Ommedal was mayor of Alversund Municipality from 1945–1946.
