= Alverstraumen =

Village in Alver Municipality, Norway

- Village
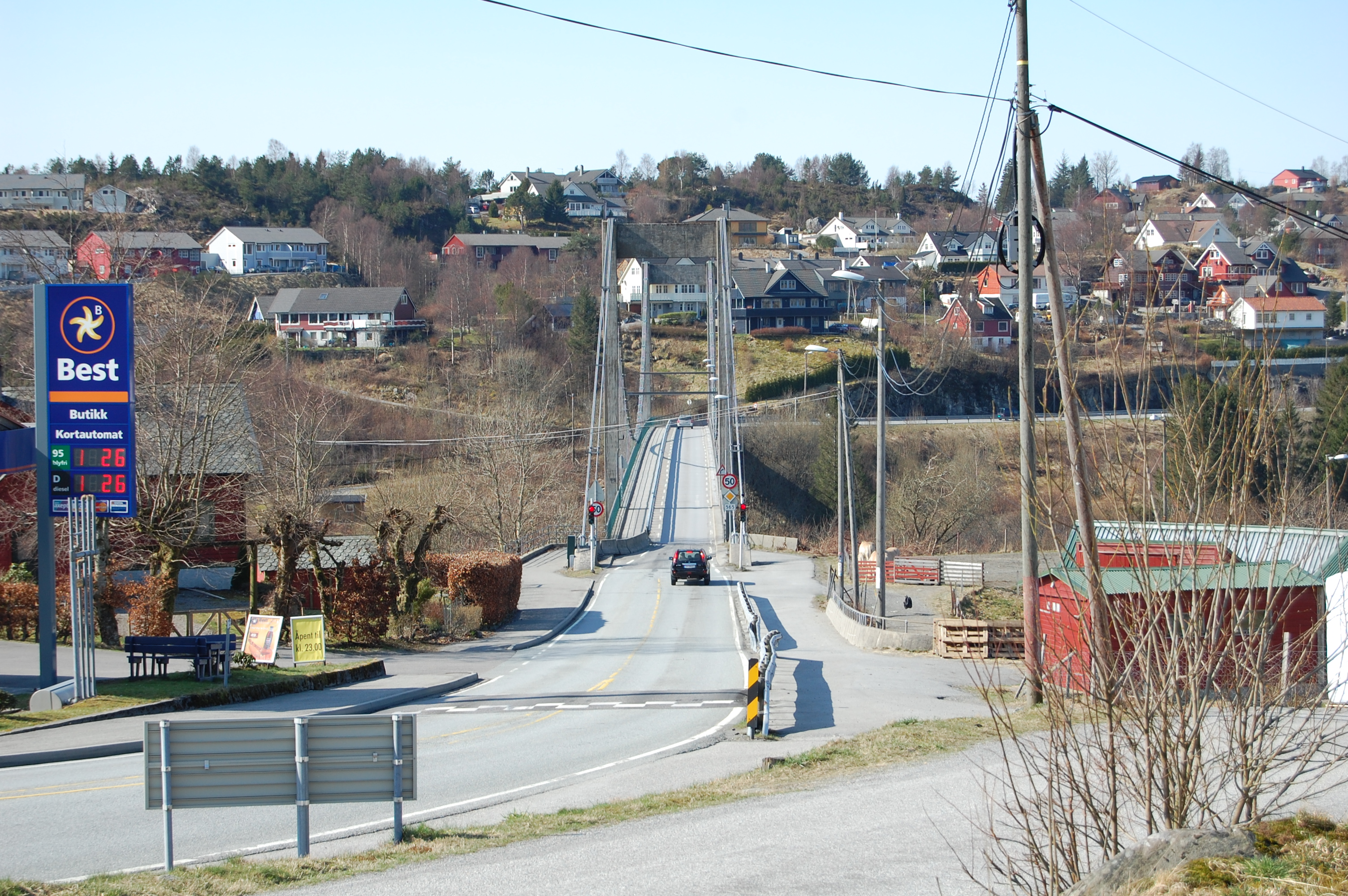
- View of the village
- Interactive map of Alverstraumen
- Coordinates: 60.57784°N 5.21878°E
- Country: Norway
- Region: Western Norway
- County: Vestland
- District: Nordhordland
- Municipality: Alver Municipality
- Elevation: 24 m (79 ft)
- Time zone: UTC+01:00 (CET)
  - Summer (DST): UTC+02:00 (CEST)
- Post Code: 5911 Alversund

Alverstraumen is a village in Alver Municipality in Vestland county, Norway. The village is located at the southern tip of the island of Radøy. The Alversund Bridge connects Alverstraumen to the village of Alversund across the Alverstraumen strait to the east.

The 1-kilometre (0.62 mi) long Alverstraumen strait runs along the eastern side of the village connecting the Radsundet strait to the Radfjorden, and it separates the mainland from the island of Radøy.
