= Meland Church =

Church in Vestland, Norway

- Meland kyrkje
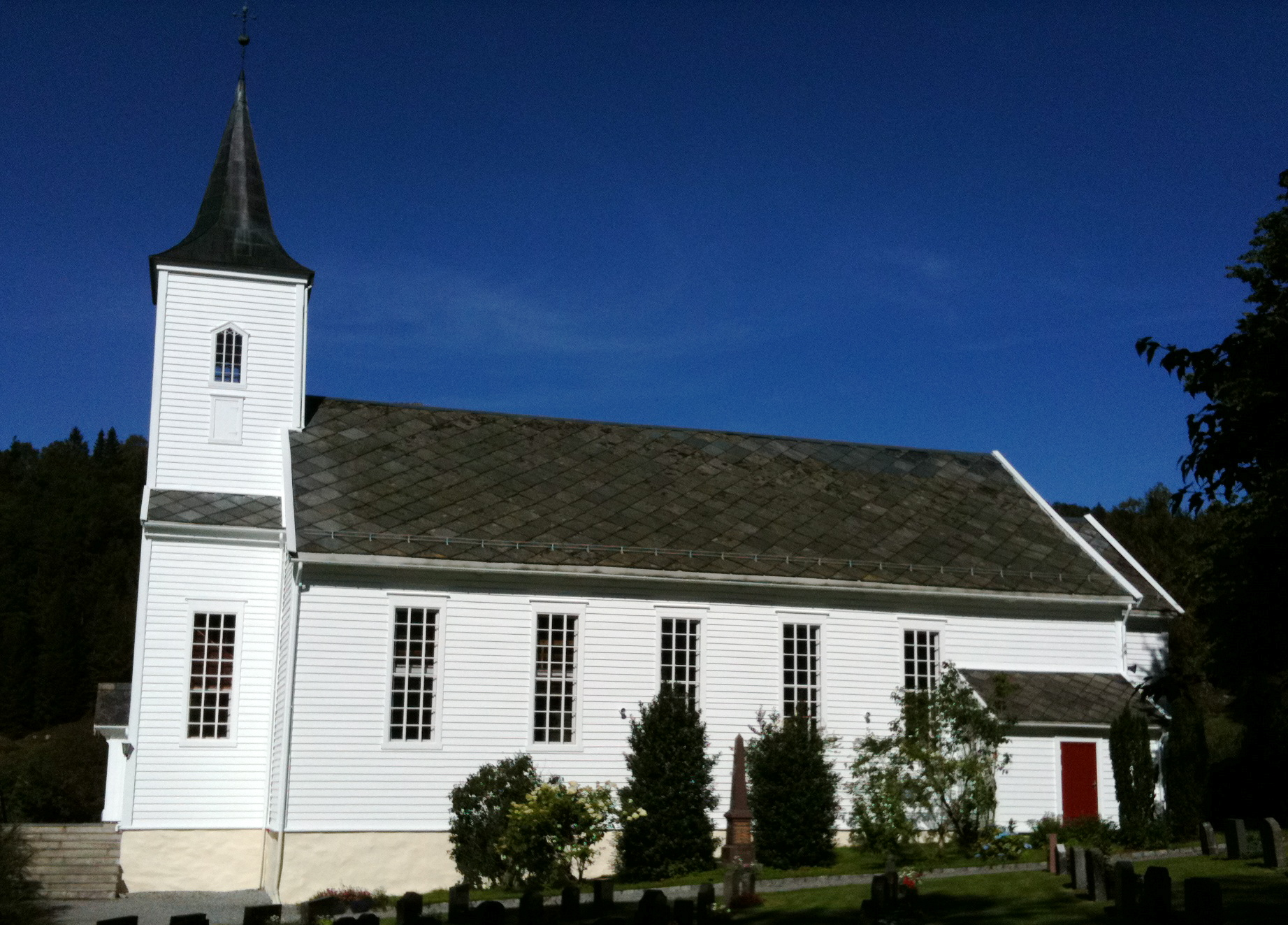
- View of the church
- Meland Church
- 60°32′27″N 5°11′29″E
- Location: Alver Municipality, Vestland
- Country: Norway
- Denomination: Church of Norway
- Previous denomination: Catholic Church
- Churchmanship: Evangelical Lutheran

History
- Status: Parish church
- Founded: 13th century
- Consecrated: 1866

Architecture
- Functional status: Active
- Architect: Johannes Øvsthus
- Architectural type: Long church
- Completed: 1866 (160 years ago)

Specifications
- Capacity: 340
- Materials: Wood

Administration
- Diocese: Bjørgvin bispedømme
- Deanery: Nordhordland prosti
- Parish: Meland
- Norwegian Cultural Heritage Site
- Type: Church
- Status: Listed
- ID: 84933

Meland Church (Norwegian: Meland kyrkje) is a parish church of the Church of Norway in Alver Municipality in Vestland county, Norway. It is located in the village of Meland on the island of Holsnøy. It is the church for the Meland parish which is part of the Nordhordland prosti (deanery) in the Diocese of Bjørgvin. The white, wooden church was built in a long church design in 1866 using plans drawn up by the architect Johannes Øvsthus. The church seats about 340 people.

== History ==
There has been a church in Meland for a long time. The earliest existing historical records of the church date back to at least the year 1350, but it was likely built before that time. The first church in Meland was a wooden stave church that was probably built during the 13th century. That church stood about 225 metres (738 ft) to the southwest of the present church site. Around the year 1616, the old church was torn down and replaced by a timber-framed long church on the same site. The new church was described as having a nave that measured about 10.7 by 9.4 metres (35 ft × 31 ft) and a choir that measured about 6.3 by 6.3 metres (21 ft × 21 ft). The church had a "moderately-sized" tower above a church porch. In 1695, the tower was refurbished with a new roof and spire.

In 1731, the church was sold into private ownership by the King. In 1856, the private owners of the church sold it to the municipality. The municipal government thought the church was too small and in need of repairs, so they planned to replace it with a new church. Johannes Øvsthus was hired to design the new church and Askild Aase was hired as the lead builder. A plot of land, about 225 metres (738 ft) to the northeast of the old church site was acquired for the new church. The new church was completed in 1866, and after that, the old church was torn down. In 1954–1955, the church was enlarged according to drawings by the architect Ole Halvorsen from Bergen. This addition on the north side of the chancel included bathrooms, a sacristy, classroom, and storage areas.

== Media gallery ==
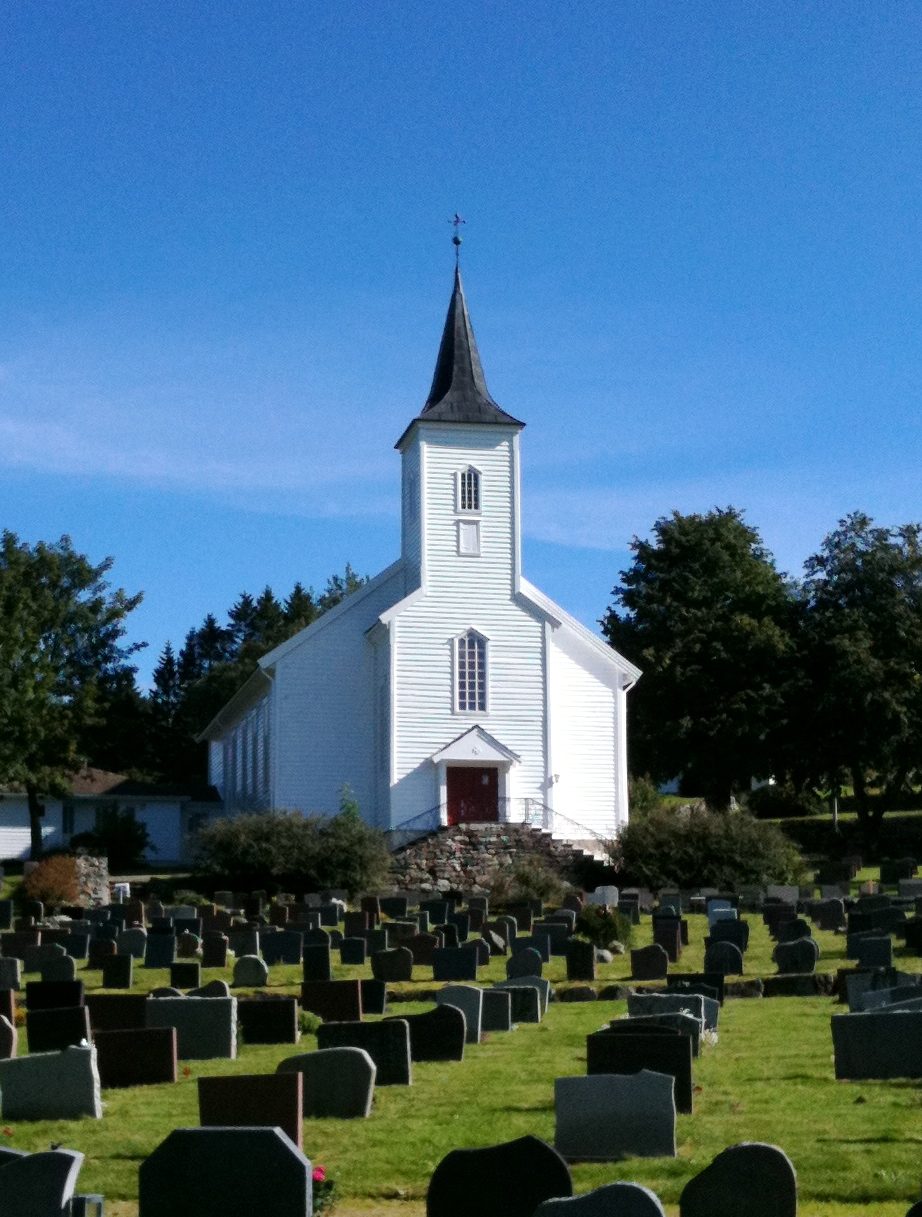

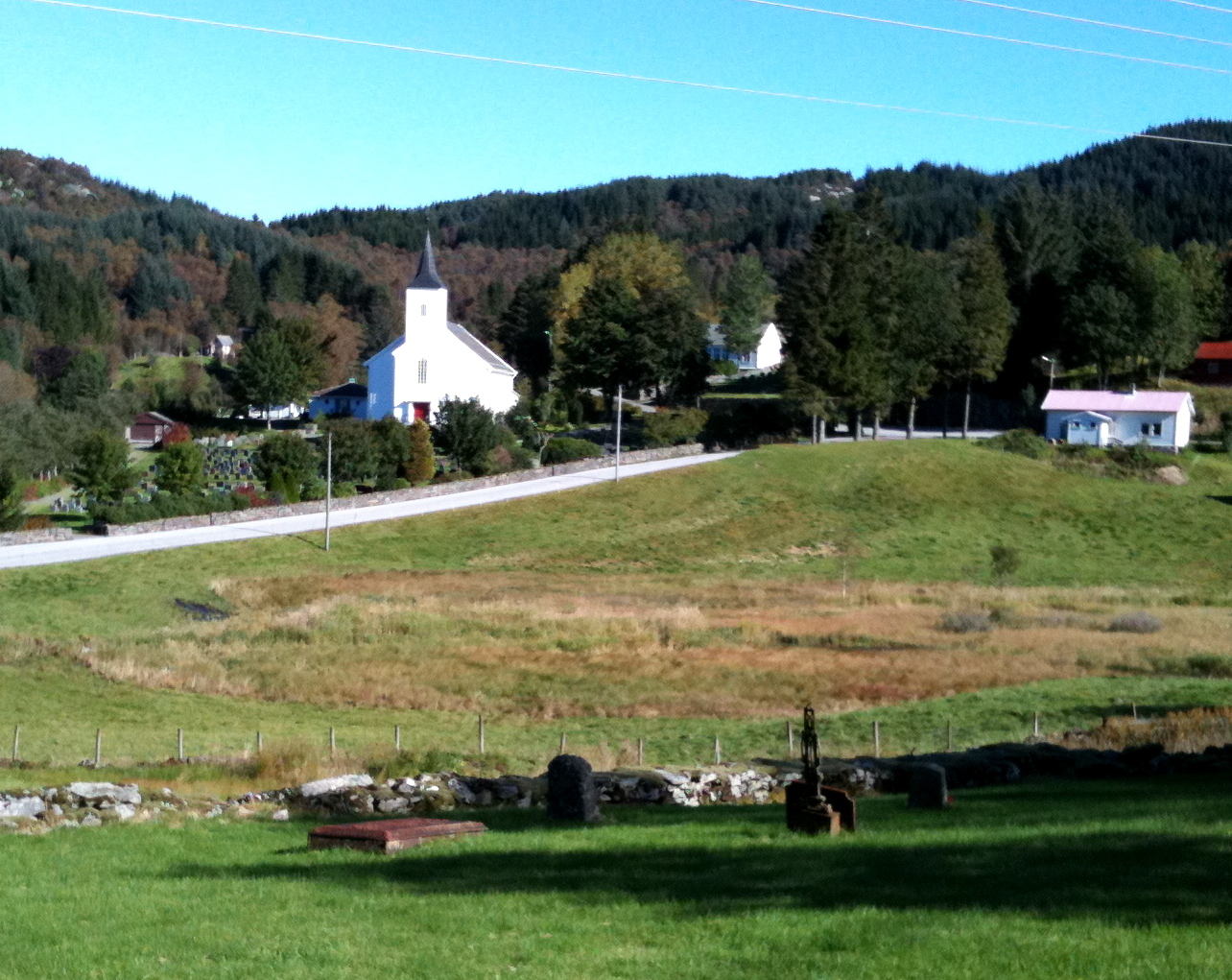

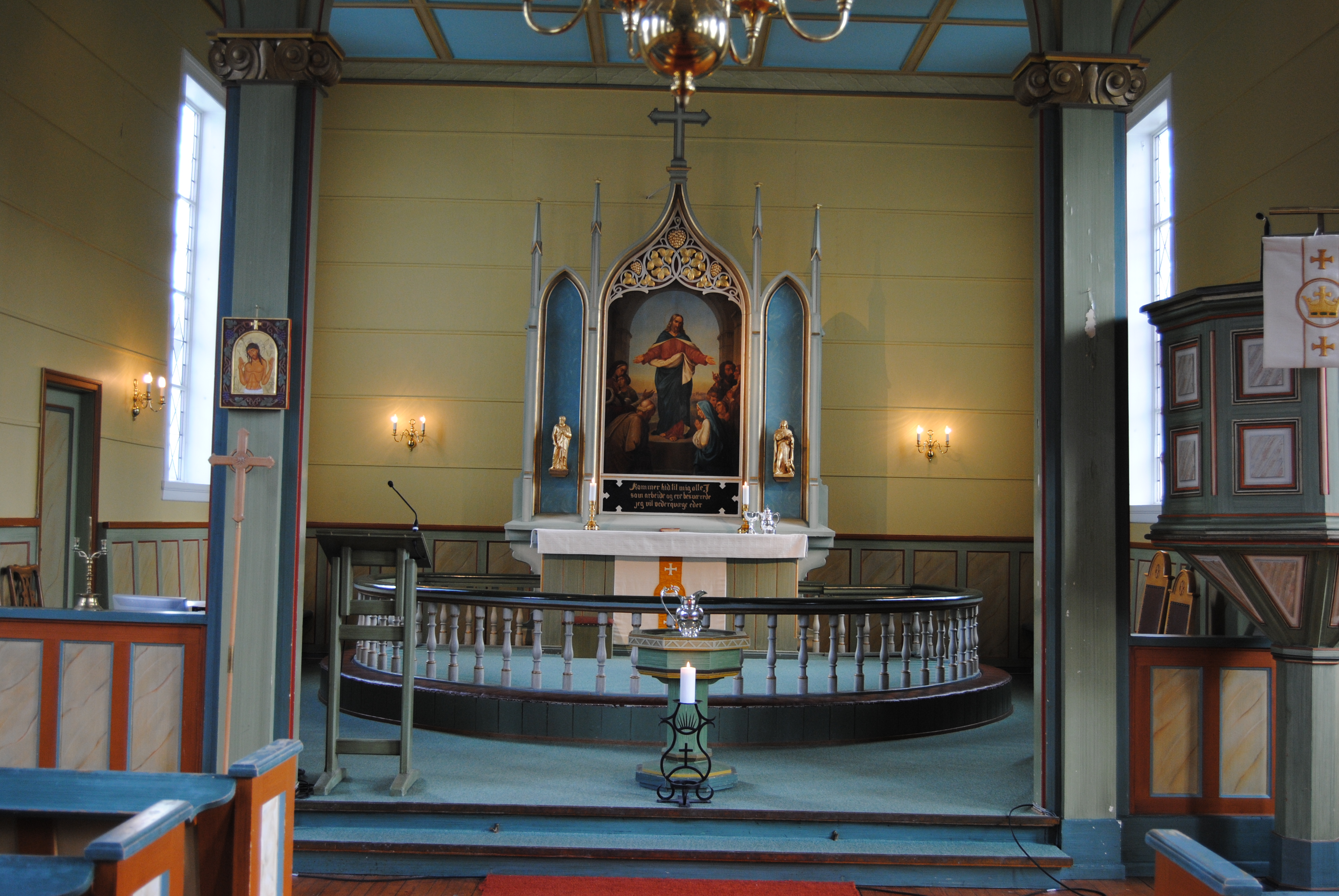

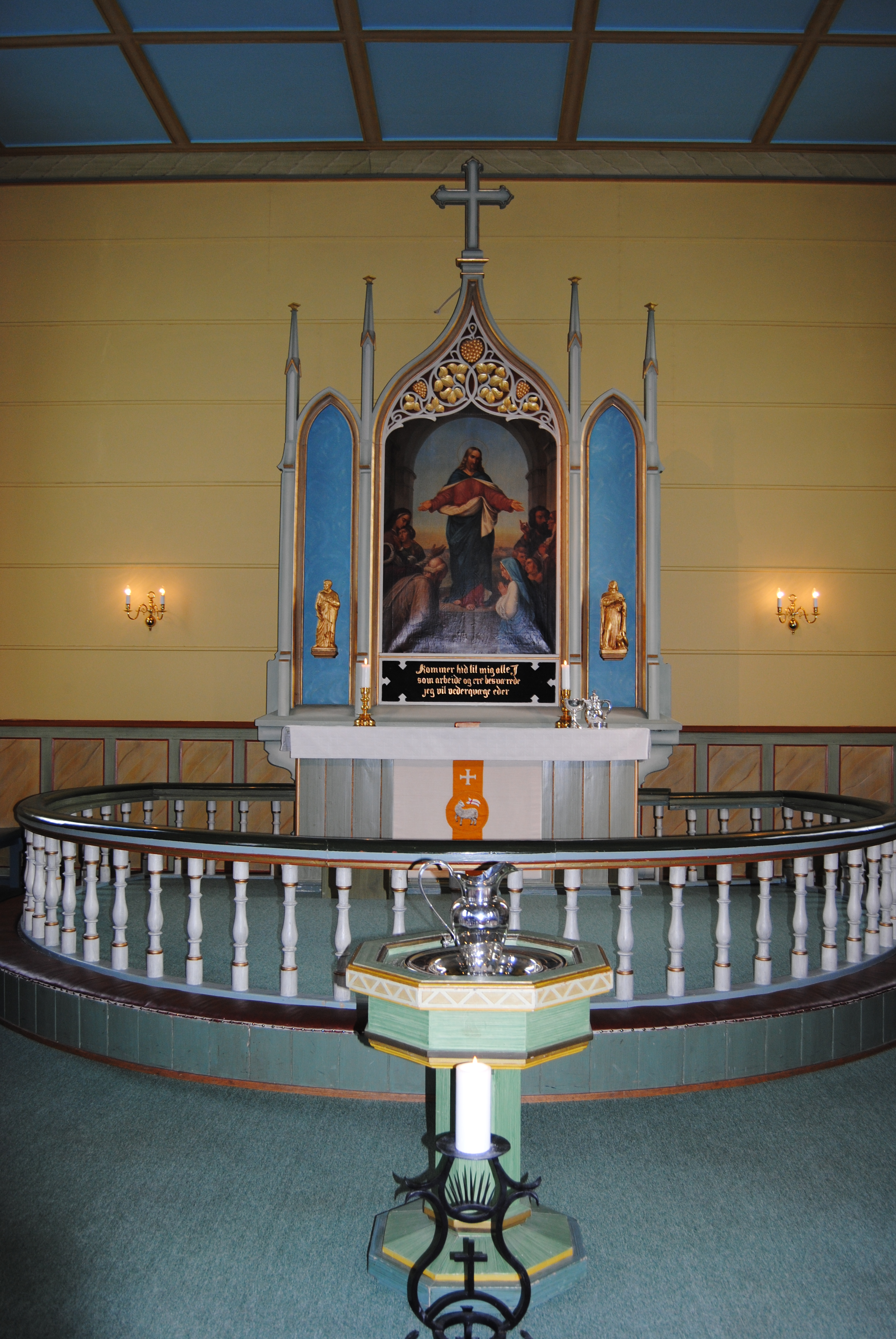

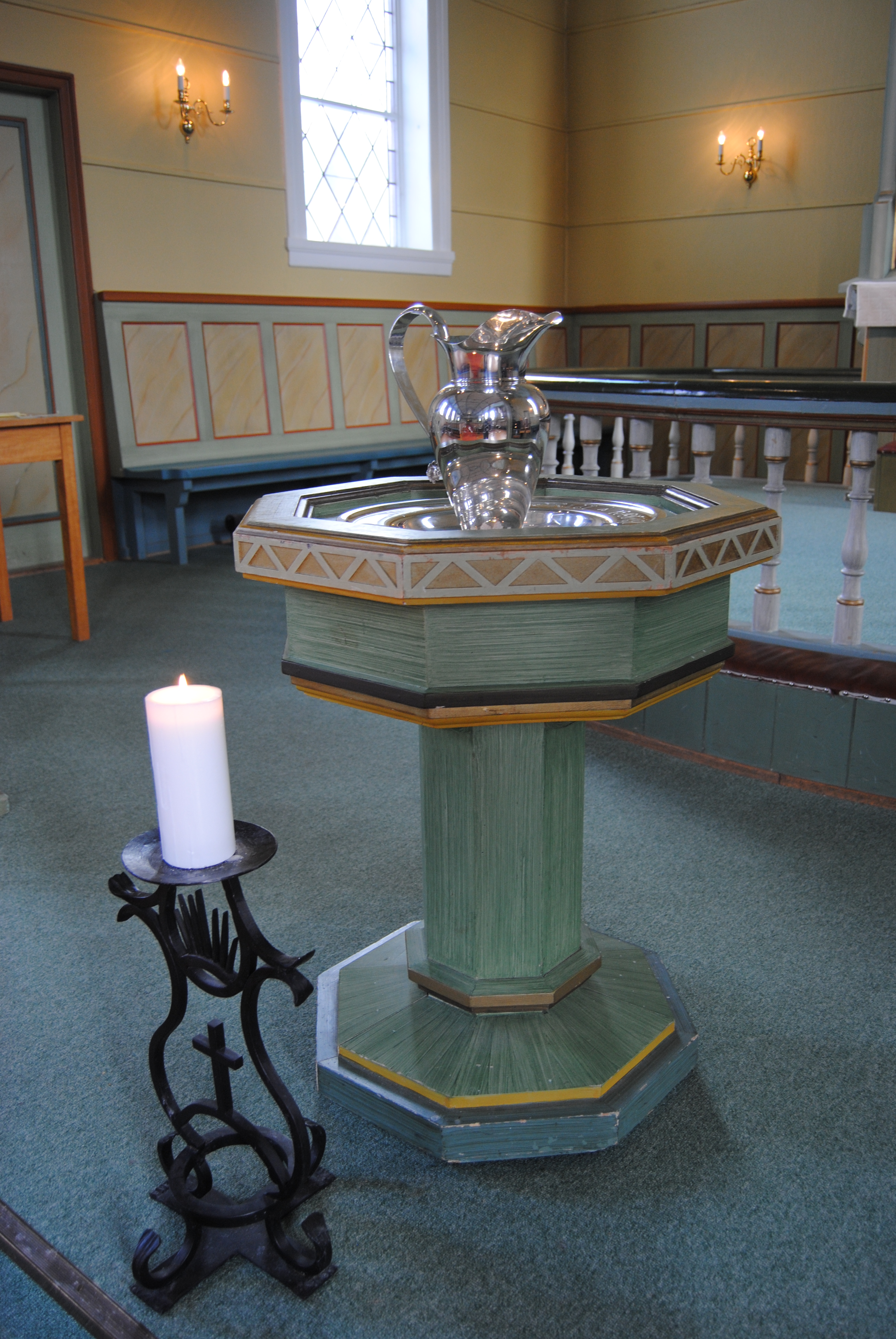

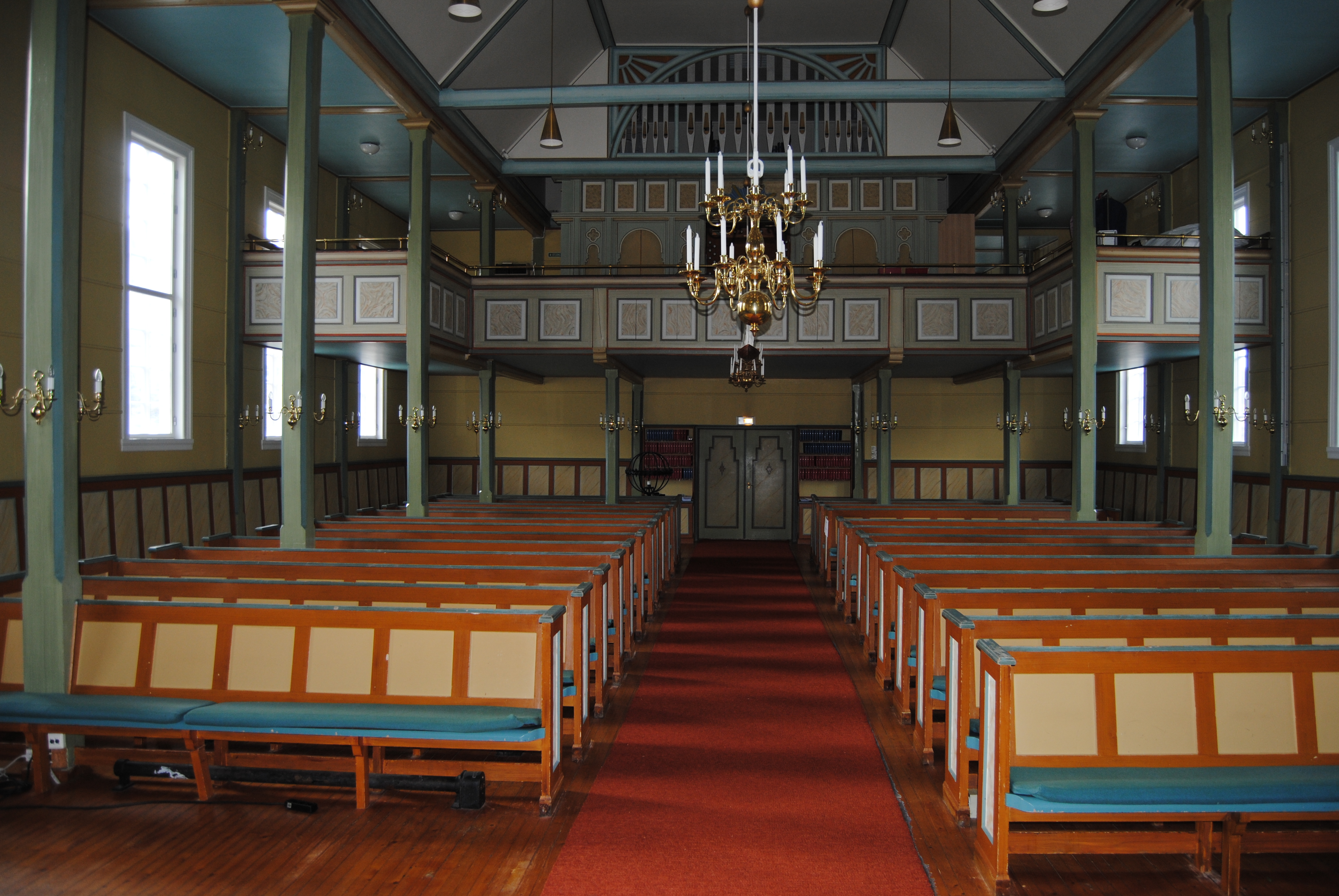

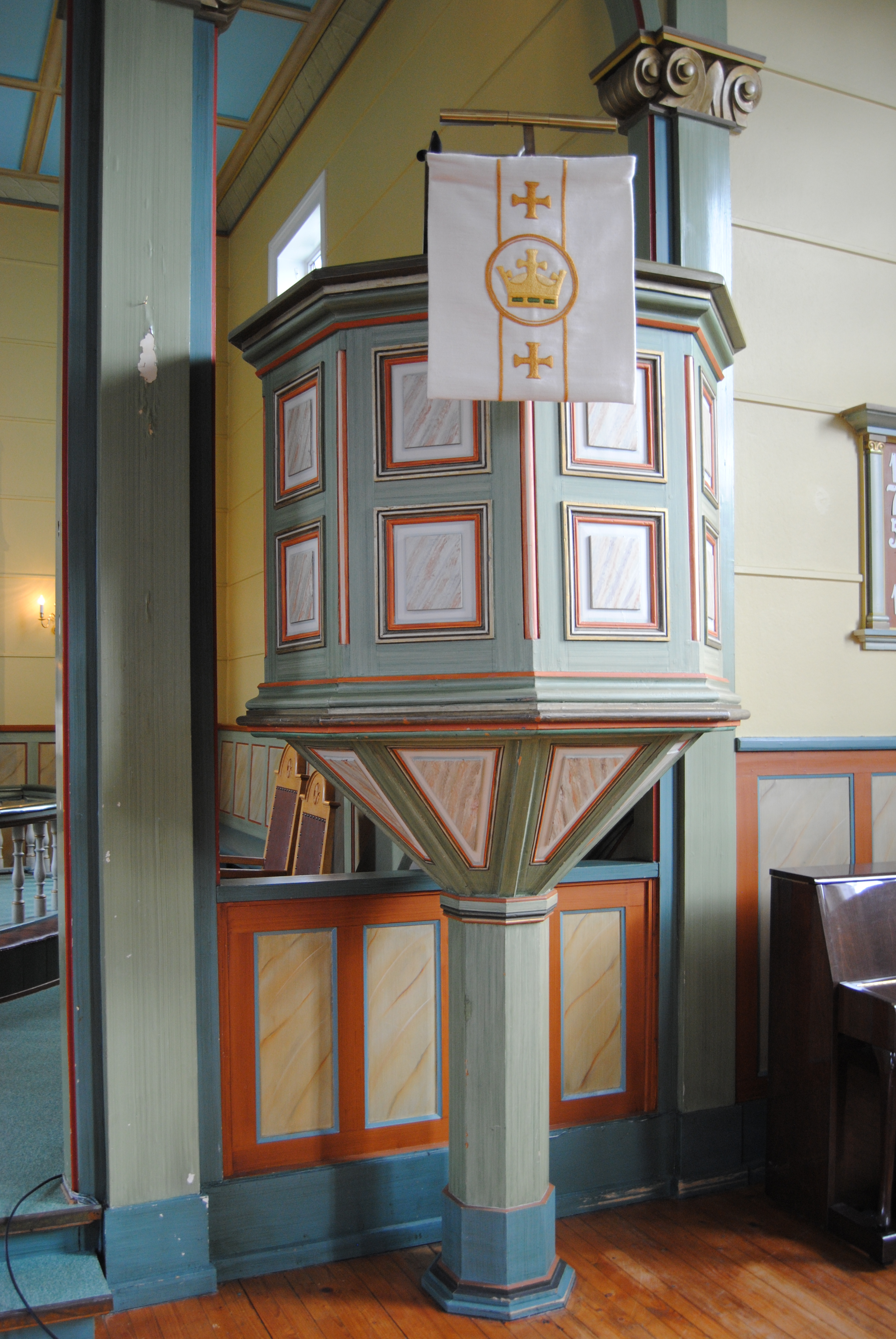

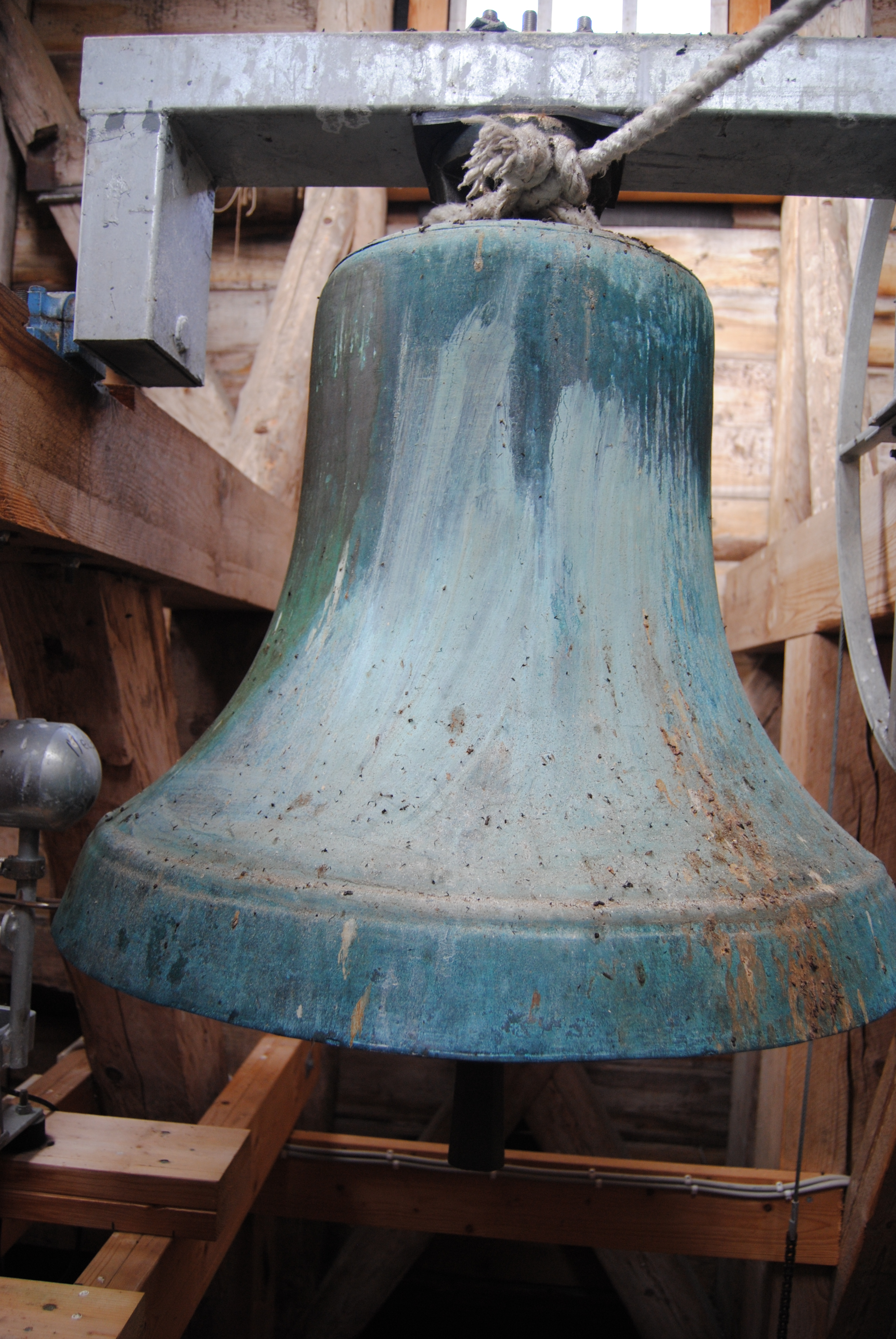

== See also ==
- List of churches in Bjørgvin
