= Holme, Vestland =

Village in Alver Municipality, Norway

Holme
- Village
- Interactive map of Holme
- Coordinates: 60.52925°N 5.1547°E
- Country: Norway
- Region: Western Norway
- County: Vestland
- District: Nordhordland
- Municipality: Alver Municipality

Area
  - Total: 0.57 km^{2} (0.22 sq mi)
- Elevation: 27 m (89 ft)

Population (2025)
  - Total: 920
  - Density: 1,614/km^{2} (4,180/sq mi)
- Time zone: UTC+01:00 (CET)
  - Summer (DST): UTC+02:00 (CEST)
- Post Code: 5918 Frekhaug

Holme is a village in Alver Municipality in Vestland county, Norway. The village lies along Herdlefjorden on the western coast of the island of Holsnøy.

The 0.57-square-kilometre (140-acre) village has a population (2025) of 920 and a population density of 1,614 inhabitants per square kilometre (4,180/sq mi).
