= Alver Municipality =

Municipality in Vestland, Norway

Alver Municipality Alver kommune
- Municipality
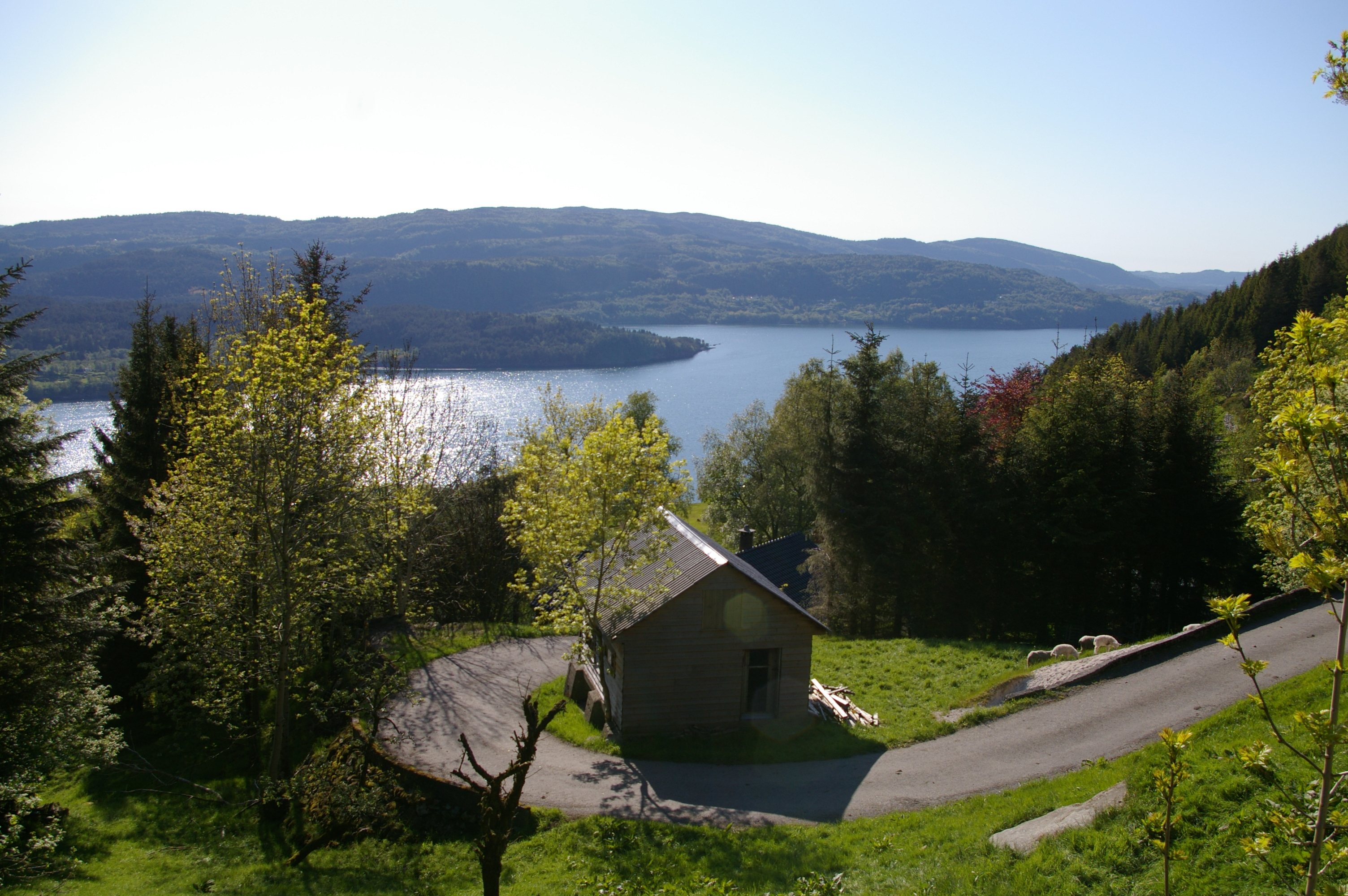
- View of Veland along the Hindnesfjorden

- Coat of arms

- Vestland within Norway

- Alver within Vestland
- Coordinates: 60°40′00″N 05°20′00″E
- Country: Norway
- County: Vestland
- District: Nordhordland
- Established: 1 Jan 2020
  - Preceded by: Lindås, Radøy, Meland
- Administrative centre: Knarvik

Government
  - Mayor (2023): Ingrid Fjeldsbø (H)

Area
  - Total: 679.15 km^{2} (262.22 sq mi)
  - Land: 650.57 km^{2} (251.19 sq mi)
  - Water: 28.58 km^{2} (11.03 sq mi) 4.2%
  - Rank: #168 in Norway
- Highest elevation: 957.06 m (3,140.0 ft)

Population (2025)
  - Total: 30,169
  - Rank: #37 in Norway
  - Density: 44.4/km^{2} (115/sq mi)
  - Change (10 years): ▲ +8.4%
- Demonym(s): Alver-mann; Alver-kvinne; Alver-folk

Official language
  - Norwegian form: Nynorsk
- Time zone: UTC+01:00 (CET)
  - Summer (DST): UTC+02:00 (CEST)
- ISO 3166 code: NO-4631
- Website: Official website

Alver is a municipality in Vestland county, Norway. It is located in the traditional district of Nordhordland. The administrative centre of the municipality is the village of Knarvik. Other villages include Alversund, Alver, Isdalstø, Lindås, Ostereidet, Seim, Manger, Askeland, Austmarka, Bøvågen, Haugland, Sæbø, Sletta, Frekhaug, Hjartås, Holme, Io, Krossneset, Meland, and Rossland.

The 679.15-square-kilometre (262.22 sq mi) municipality is the 168th largest by area out of the 357 municipalities in Norway. Alver Municipality is the 37th most populous municipality in Norway with a population of 30,169. The municipality's population density is 44.4 inhabitants per square kilometre (115/sq mi) and its population has increased by 8.4% over the previous 10-year period.

== General information ==
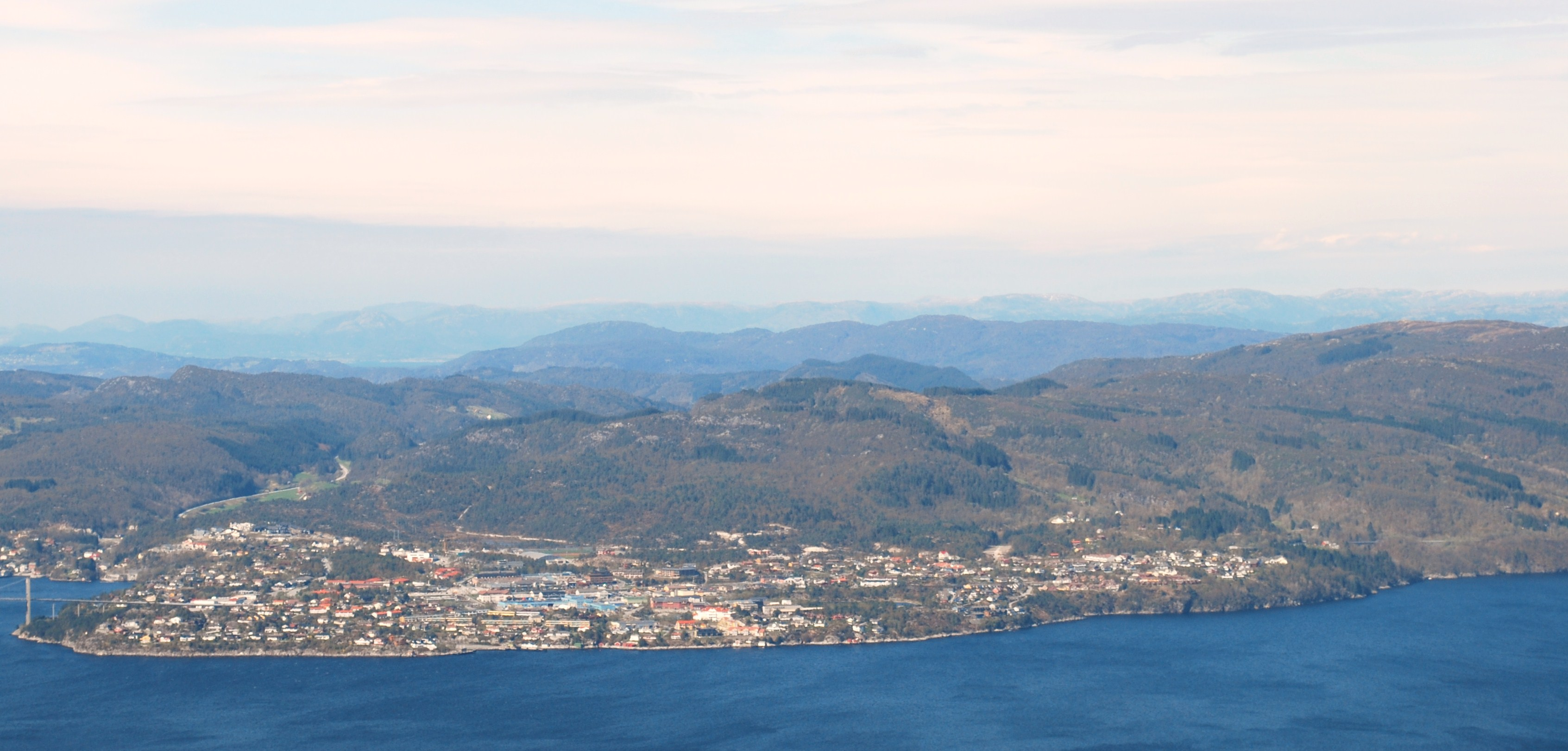
View of the municipal centre, Knarvik

The municipality was established on 1 January 2020 when Lindås Municipality, Radøy Municipality, and Meland Municipality were merged into one large municipality.

=== Name ===
The municipality is named after the old Alver farm (Old Norse: Alviðra). The first element is allr which means "whole" or "entire". The last element is the genitive case of the word veðr which means "weather". Thus it is probably referring to the location which is exposed to the weather from all directions. It is the same root as the other local names like Alversund and Alverstraumen.

=== Coat of arms ===
The coat of arms was adopted in 2019 for use starting on 1 January 2020. The blazon is "Azure, a bridge over a boat argent". This means the arms have a blue field (background) and the charge is an arched road bridge with a boat going underneath. The charge has a tincture of argent which means it is commonly colored white, but if it is made out of metal, then silver is used. It symbolizes that the fact that bridges tie the municipality together and the boat has been a means of transportation in the area for centuries.

=== Churches ===
The Church of Norway has six parishes (sokn) within Alver Municipality. It is part of the Nordhordland prosti (deanery) in the Diocese of Bjørgvin.

Churches in Alver Municipality
Parish (sokn)	Church name	Location of the church	Year built
Knarvik	Alversund Church	Alversund	1879
Knarvik	Knarvik Church	Knarvik	2014
Knarvik	Lygra Church	Luro	1892
Knarvik	Seim Church	Seim	1878
Lindås	Hundvin Church	Hundvin	1936
Lindås	Lindås Church	Lindås	1865
Lindås	Myking Church	Myking	1861
Meland	Meland Church	Meland	1866
Ostereidet	Ostereidet Church	Ostereidet	1988
Radøy	Hordabø Church	Bøvågen	1875
Radøy	Manger Church	Manger	1891
Radøy	Sæbø Church	Sæbø	1883
Radøy	Emigrant Church, Sletta	Sletta	1997
Vike	Vike Church	Vikanes	1891

== Geography ==
The highest point in the municipality is the 957.06-metre (3,140.0 ft) tall mountain Sørdalsnuten, located just west of the border with Modalen Municipality. Gulen Municipality and Masfjorden Municipality is located to the north, Modalen Municipality is located to the northeast, Vaksdal Municipality is located to the east, Osterøy Municipality is located to the southeast, Bergen Municipality is located to the south, Askøy Municipality is located to the southwest, Øygarden Municipality is located to the west, Fedje Municipality and Austrheim Municipality are both located to the northwest.

== Government ==
Alver Municipality is responsible for primary education (through 10th grade), outpatient health services, senior citizen services, welfare and other social services, zoning, economic development, and municipal roads and utilities. The municipality is governed by a municipal council of directly elected representatives. The mayor is indirectly elected by a vote of the municipal council. The municipality is under the jurisdiction of the Hordaland District Court and the Gulating Court of Appeal.

=== Municipal council ===
The municipal council (Kommunestyre) of Alver Municipality is made up of 41 representatives that are elected to four-year terms. The tables below show the current and historical composition of the council by political party.

Alver kommunestyre 2023–2027
Party name (in Nynorsk)	Number of representatives
Labour Party (Arbeidarpartiet)	6
Progress Party (Framstegspartiet)	6
Green Party (Miljøpartiet Dei Grøne)	1
Conservative Party (Høgre)	8
Industry and Business Party (Industri‑ og Næringspartiet)	4
Christian Democratic Party (Kristeleg Folkeparti)	6
Red Party (Raudt)	1
Centre Party (Senterpartiet)	6
Socialist Left Party (Sosialistisk Venstreparti)	2
Liberal Party (Venstre)	1
Total number of members:	41

Alver kommunestyre 2020–2023
Party name (in Nynorsk)	Number of representatives
Labour Party (Arbeidarpartiet)	7
People's Action No to More Road Tolls (Folkeaksjonen nei til meir bompengar)	10
Progress Party (Framstegspartiet)	3
Green Party (Miljøpartiet Dei Grøne)	2
Conservative Party (Høgre)	6
Christian Democratic Party (Kristeleg Folkeparti)	7
Red Party (Raudt)	1
Centre Party (Senterpartiet)	8
Socialist Left Party (Sosialistisk Venstreparti)	2
Liberal Party (Venstre)	1
Total number of members:	47

=== Mayors ===
The mayor (Nynorsk: ordførar) of Alver Municipality is the political leader of the municipality and the chairperson of the municipal council. Here is a list of people who have held this position:

- 2020–2023: Sara Hamre Sekkingstad (Sp)
- 2023–present: Ingrid Fjeldsbø (H)

== Notable people ==
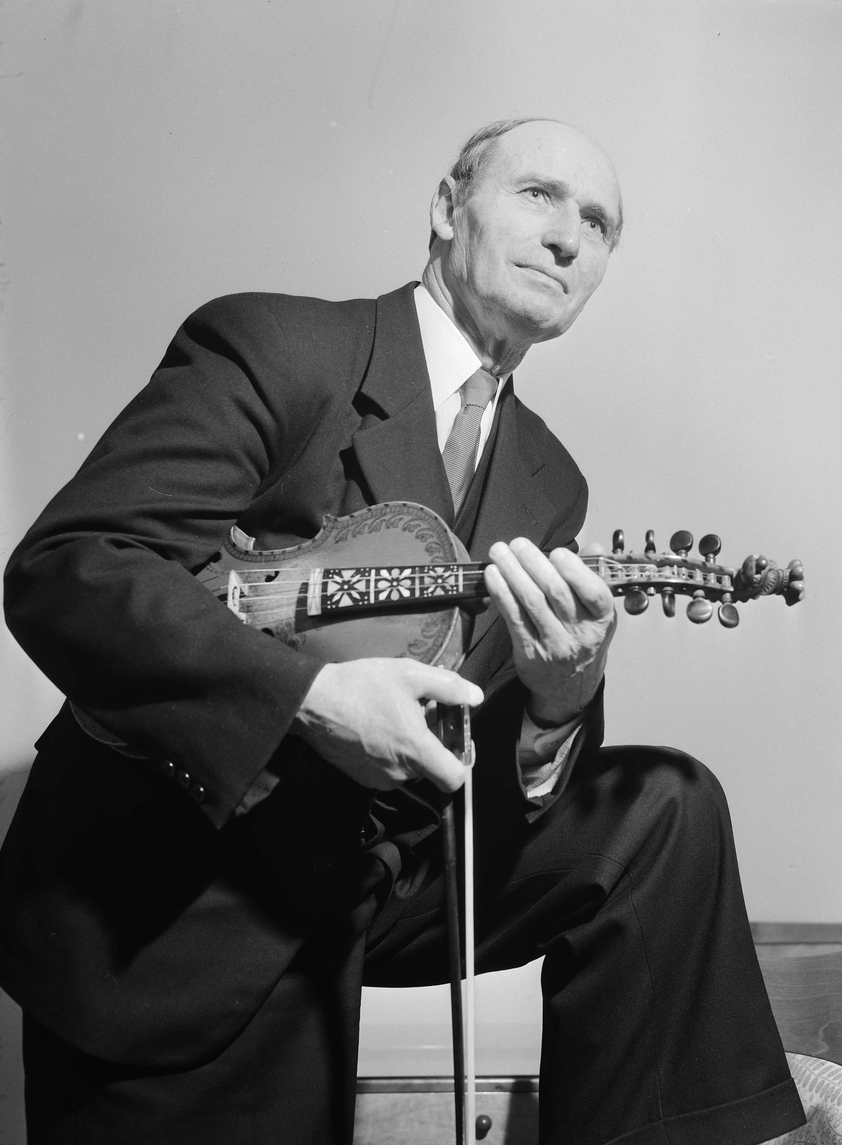
Arne Bjørndal, 1953

- Carl Andreas Fougstad (1806 in Alverstraumen – 1871), a lawyer, journalist, author, and mayor of Oslo
- Arne Bjørndal (1882 in Hosanger – 1965), a hardingfele fiddler, composer, and folklorist
- Amund Rydland (1888 in Alversund – 1967), a stage and film actor and theatre director
- Nils Hjelmtveit (1892 in Hopland – 1985), an educator and Norwegian politician
- Lars Amandus Aasgard (1907 in Lindås – 1984), a furniture factory manager, politician, and mayor of Lindås from 1951 to 1963
- Torolv Solheim (1907 in Radøy – 1995), an educator, essayist, resistance member, and politician
- Aslaug Låstad Lygre (1910 in Lindås – 1966), a poet
- Narve Bjørgo (born 1936 in Meland), a historian and academic
- Magnar Mangersnes (born 1938 in Radøy), an organist and choral conductor
- Audun Sjøstrand (born 1950 in Radøy), a journalist, teacher, and crime fiction writer

=== Sport ===
- Nils Sæbø (1897 in Radøy – 1985), an equestrian who competed at the 1936 Summer Olympics
- Lise Klaveness (born 1981 in Meland), a lawyer and footballer with 73 caps for the Norway women's football team
- Sindre Marøy (born 1982 in Hordabø), a former professional footballer with over 100 club caps
