= Bergen Assembly 2025 =

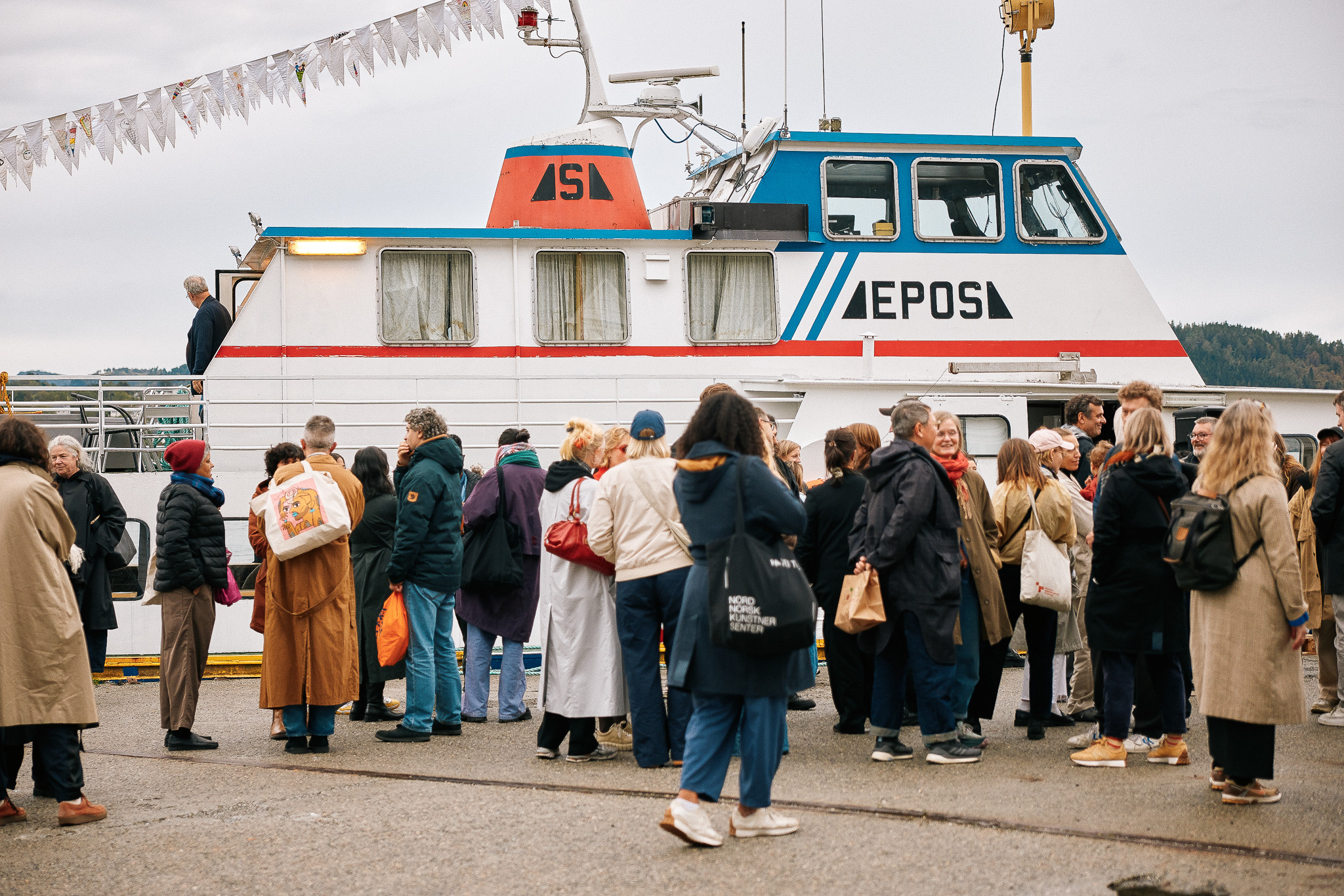
- Genre: Contemporary art
- Begins: 11 September 2025
- Ends: 9 November 2025
- Location: Bergen
- Country: Norway
- Previous event: Bergen Assembly 2022
- Next event: Bergen Assembly 2028
- Organizer: Ravi Agarwal; Adania Shibli; Bergen School of Architecture
- Website: Official website

Bergen Assembly 2025, titled across, with, nearby (Norwegian: på tvers, med, nær), was the fifth edition of Bergen Assembly and took place from 11 September to 9 November 2025 in Bergen, Norway. Convened by Ravi Agarwal, Adania Shibli, and the Bergen School of Architecture (BAS), the programme focused on neighbourliness, mutual care, and shared modes of learning as responses to social, ecological, economic, and political uncertainty.

The 2025 edition was structured around collaborative and process-based artistic formats, with an emphasis on exchange, participation, and collective forms of knowledge production. The programme took place across multiple venues in Bergen, including Bergen Kunsthall, the Bergen School of Architecture, Kristiansholm, and the Norwegian Textile Industry Museum, and comprised excursions, workshops, conversations, performances, readings, and other public events.

Independent art press described the 2025 edition as an “artistic think tank” focused on collective knowledge exchange and shared learning. A review in Lampoon Magazine highlighted how contributors asked visitors to engage with the city’s environment as part of the Assembly’s inquiry into ecological and social interdependence. Coverage in Live Mint also noted the Assembly’s focus on shared modes of knowledge formation and collective experience.

== Participants ==
Venue	Artists and contributors
Bergen Assembly office	Al Borde
Bergen Cathedral School	Tenthaus; The Communist Museum of Palestine
Bergen Fisheries Museum	Sarah Kazmi
Bergen Kunsthall	AgriForum; Clara Hastrup; Gruppe 66; Karen Werner; Karan Shrestha; Kåre Aleksander Grundvåg; Marcus Coates; Sajan Mani; Singing Wells; Ánddir Ivvár Ivvár / Iver Jåks
Bergen Public Library / Mikey Laundrey Art Garden	INTERPRT; Climate Rights
Bergen School of Architecture	Jana Winderen; Joar Nango; Ken Are Bongo; Koki Tanaka; Prabhakar Pachpute; Susan Philipsz; Vikrant Bhise
Bergen School of Architecture / Kristiansholm	Floating University
Epos (library boat)	Elin Már Øyen Vister; Philip Rizk
Epos (writers in residence)	Layli Long Soldier; Shahram Khosravi; Maaza Mengiste
Entrée	Maasai Mbili
Matskogen, Landås	Matskogen; Gram Art Project
Nonneseter Chapel	Monica Ursina Jäger
Nonneseter Tårnfoten	Lapdiang Artimai Syiem
Rommet, USF	Bergen School of Architecture
Stranges Stiftelse	Nepal Picture Library; The Norwegian Queer Archive; People's Archive of Rural India
The Textile Industry Museum	Jakkai Siributr
Multiple venues	Communist Museum of Palestine
Online	Vinduet
