= Otternes =

Farm area in Aurland Municipality, Norway

Åtnes Otternes / Åtrenes
- Village
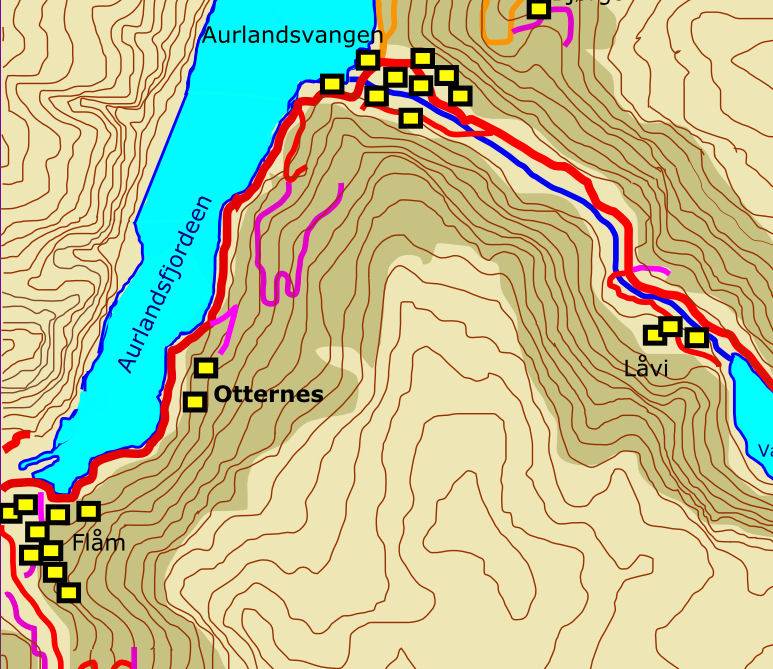
- Map of the area
- Interactive map of Åtnes
- Location within Vestland Location within Norway
- Coordinates: 60.87517°N 7.14967°E
- Country: Norway
- Region: Western Norway
- County: Vestland
- District: Sogn
- Municipality: Aurland Municipality
- Elevation: 100 m (330 ft)
- Time zone: UTC+01:00 (CET)
  - Summer (DST): UTC+02:00 (CEST)
- Post Code: 5745 Aurland

Åtnes or the historic Otternes is a linear and cluster collective farmyard located midway between the villages of Aurlandsvangen and Flåm in Aurland Municipality in Vestland county, Norway. The farmyard consists of 27 buildings.

== History ==
Evidence shows settlements from about 300 A.D. The oldest buildings, Guttormstova and Eilertstova were built about 1700. The land redistribution reform in the 1860s were not implemented in Otternes, where the allocation of strip of fields lasted until 1987. Otternes consisted originally of four farms: Tomas Farm, Guttorm Farm, Odda Farm, and Anders Farm. In the 19th century, about 30 people lived there in the farm place. The two remaining farms were run in the traditional fashion until 1970. Otternes has thus been hardly affected by the passage of time, and some of its buildings appear more or less as they did in the 18th century. The cultivated landscape remains essentially intact with hills, stairs, stone walls, wells, etc.

Otternes has been without residents since 1996. As a result of its historic flavor, the locale has therefore been a setting for several film productions.

Today Otternes serves as a rural museum and a centre for traditional crafts. It is also used for traditional activities as spinning, weaving, thin wafer crispbread (flat bread) baking, yarn dyeing, ale brewing and a variety of other exhibitions in the summer.

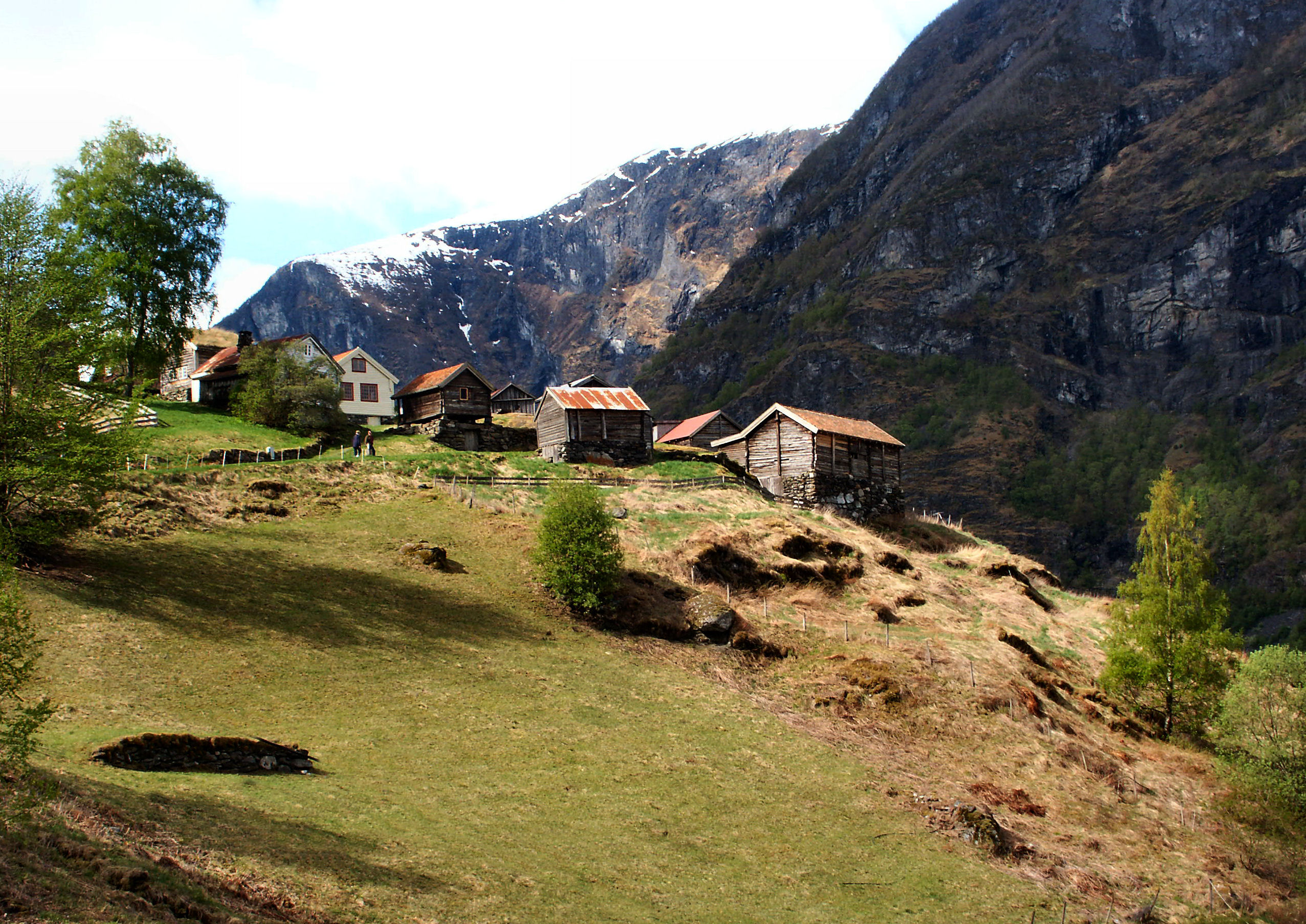
Otternes cluster farm seen from the north

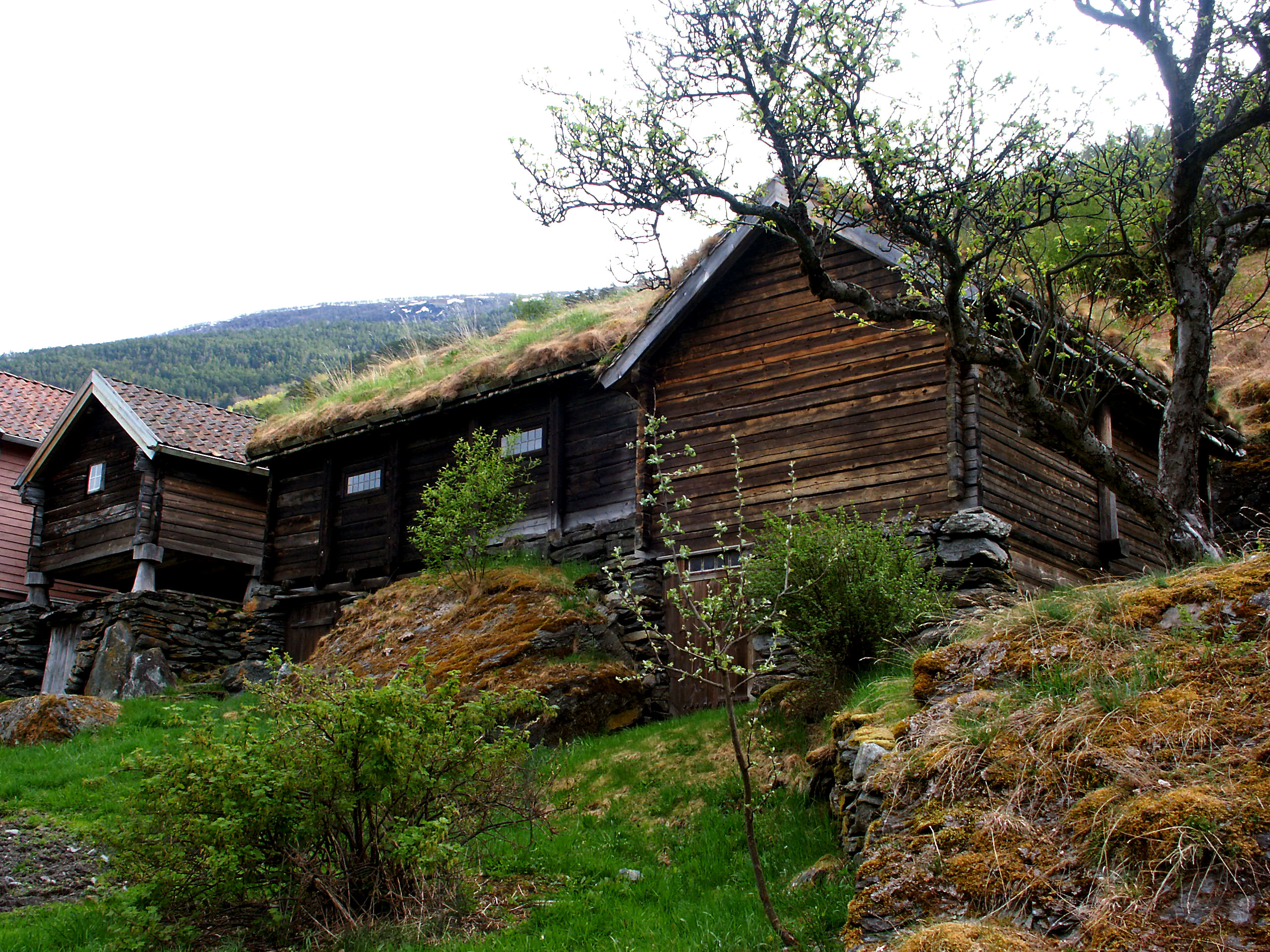
Linear collective farmyard.

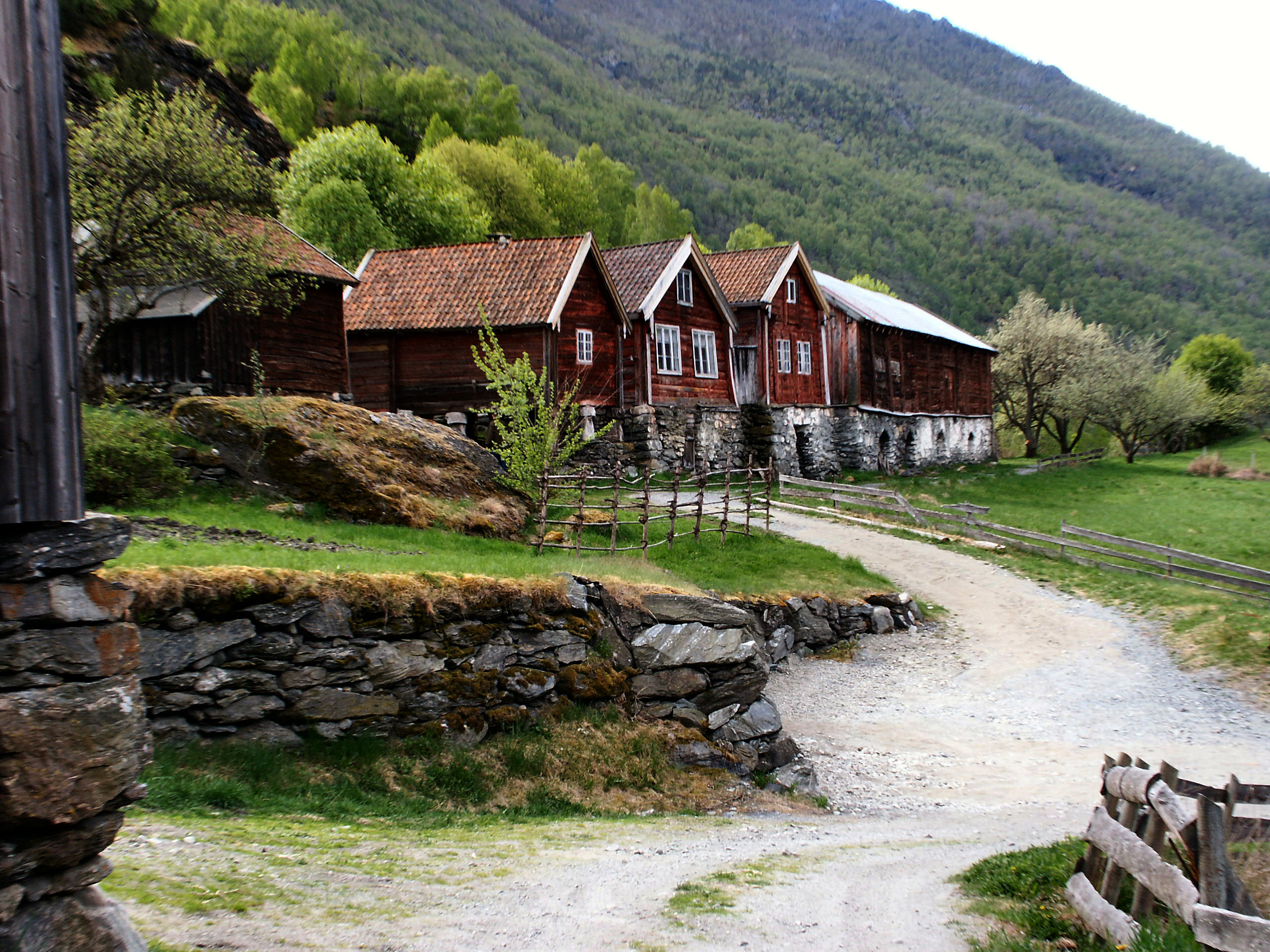
Linear collective farmyard.

== See also ==
- Strip farming in Norway
