= The Great Transformation =

The Great Transformation may refer to:

- The Great Transformation (book), a book by Karl Polanyi on the rise of the market economy in England
- The Great Transformation (Norway), a period of social change in Norway in the mid-to-late-19th century
- Great Transformation, a term for collectivization in the Soviet Union
  - Great Plan for the Transformation of Nature, a later Stalinist policy
