= Havrå =

Village in Osterøy Municipality, Norway

Havrå Havre
- Farm
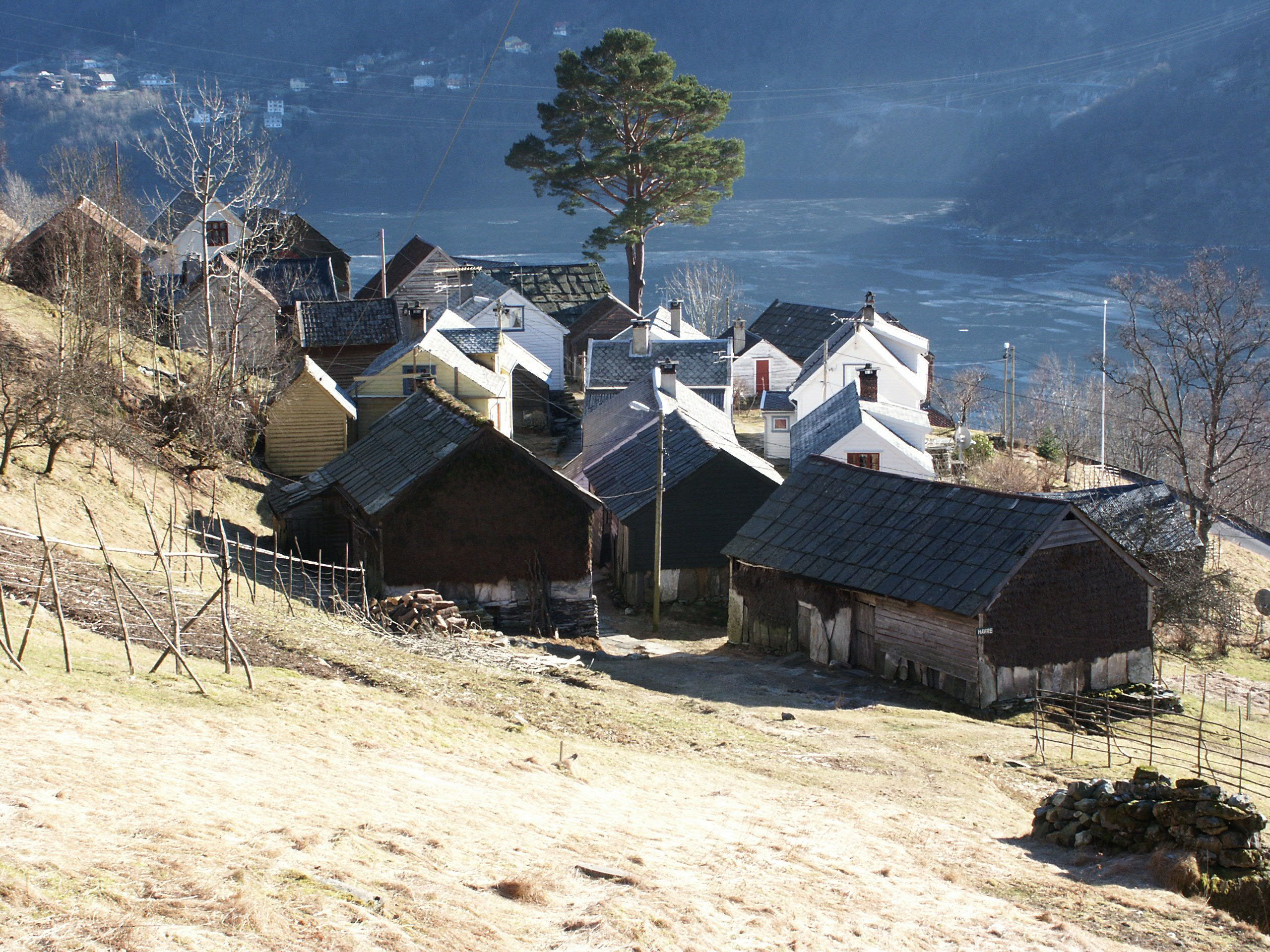
- View of the farm area, Havretunet
- Interactive map of Havrå
- Coordinates: 60.4397°N 5.57615°E
- Country: Norway
- Region: Western Norway
- County: Vestland
- District: Nordhordland
- Municipality: Osterøy Municipality
- Elevation: 86 m (282 ft)
- Time zone: UTC+01:00 (CET)
  - Summer (DST): UTC+02:00 (CEST)

Havrå (sometimes spelled Havre, Havretunet, or Havråtunet) is a preserved cluster farm along the southern shore of the island of Osterøy in Osterøy Municipality in Vestland county, Norway. Havrå is one of the last and best preserved of the common farm clusters on the western coast of Norway. Havrå was the first cultural environment to be protected under section 20 of the Norwegian Cultural Heritage Act. It was not connected to the national road network until late in the 1960s.

Havrå is situated on very steep terrain on the south side of the island of Osterøy, along the Sørfjorden. The farm area is shaped in a typical fashion for the steep terrain along the Western Norwegian fjords. It can be clearly seen from both the railway (the Bergen Line) and the highway that goes between the cities of Bergen and Oslo.

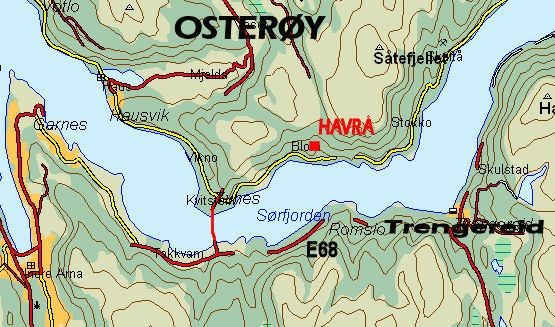
Map indicating Havrå

Many of the buildings at Havrå are characteristic to the inner coastal district between Bergen and the Sognefjorden; the combination of dry masonry and juniper cladding on barn façades that are exposed to rain and wind.

== Name ==
The name, with various spellings, dates back as far as 1303. In the oldest sources the name is written Havra (possibly representing Havrá). From the 16th century the name was often spelled (with many variations) Havre.

In 1949–1950, a film called Havretunet was made about life at Havrå. It was released in 1952. Some of the people taking part in the film worked to change the name from Havre to Havrå. This changing of name was accepted by the Norwegian Mapping Authority, but the name change remains controversial among the local population.

== Museum Centre in Hordaland ==
The farm is now a part of the museum organisation The Museum Centre in Hordaland, together with the Osterøy Museum, The Heathland Centre at Lygra, the Western Norway Emigration Center on the island of Radøy, The Textile Industry Museum, The Conservation Department, The Cultural Heritage Service in Nordhordland, and the museum administration in Salhus.

== Media gallery ==
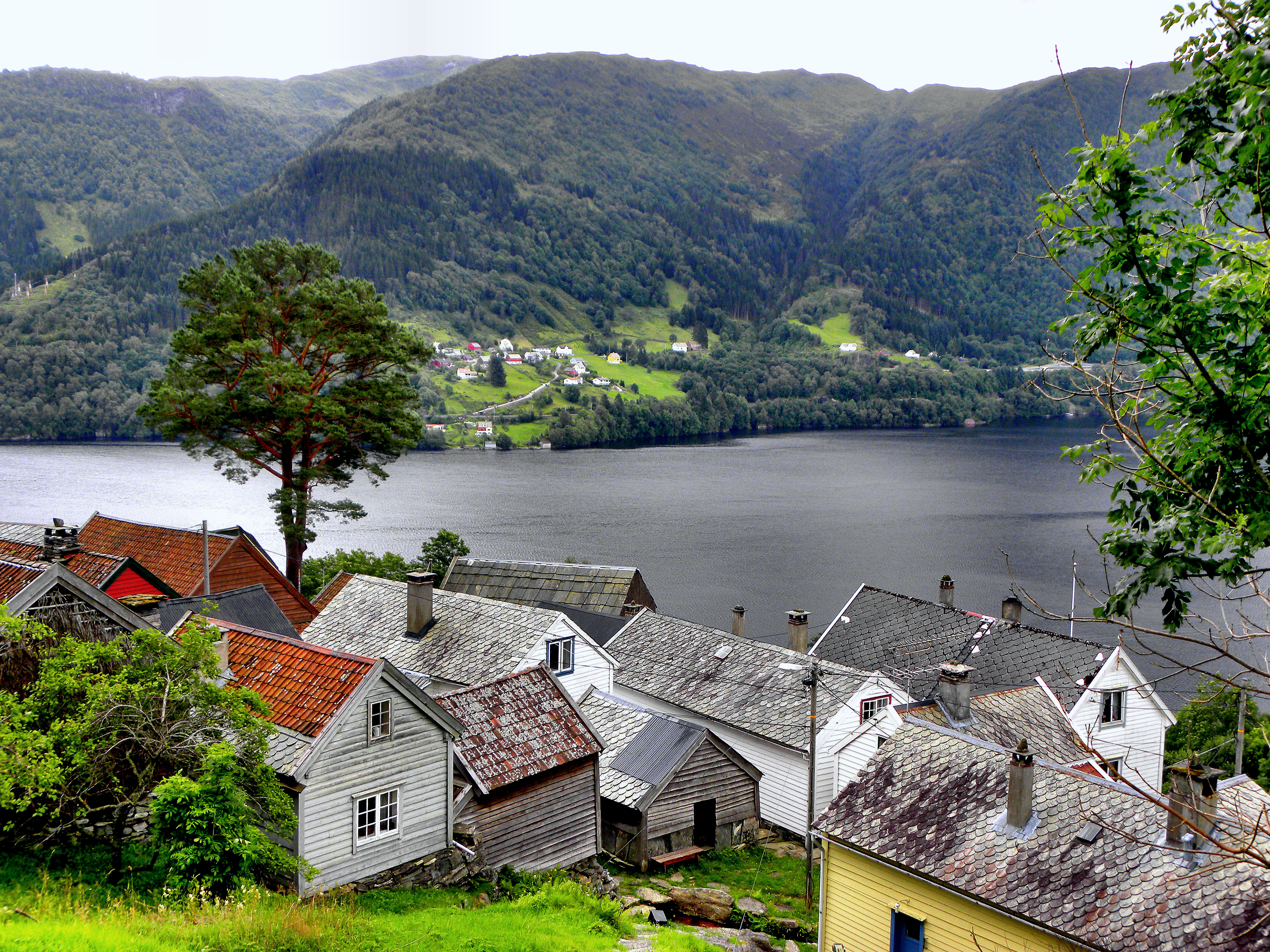
View looking south towards the mainland

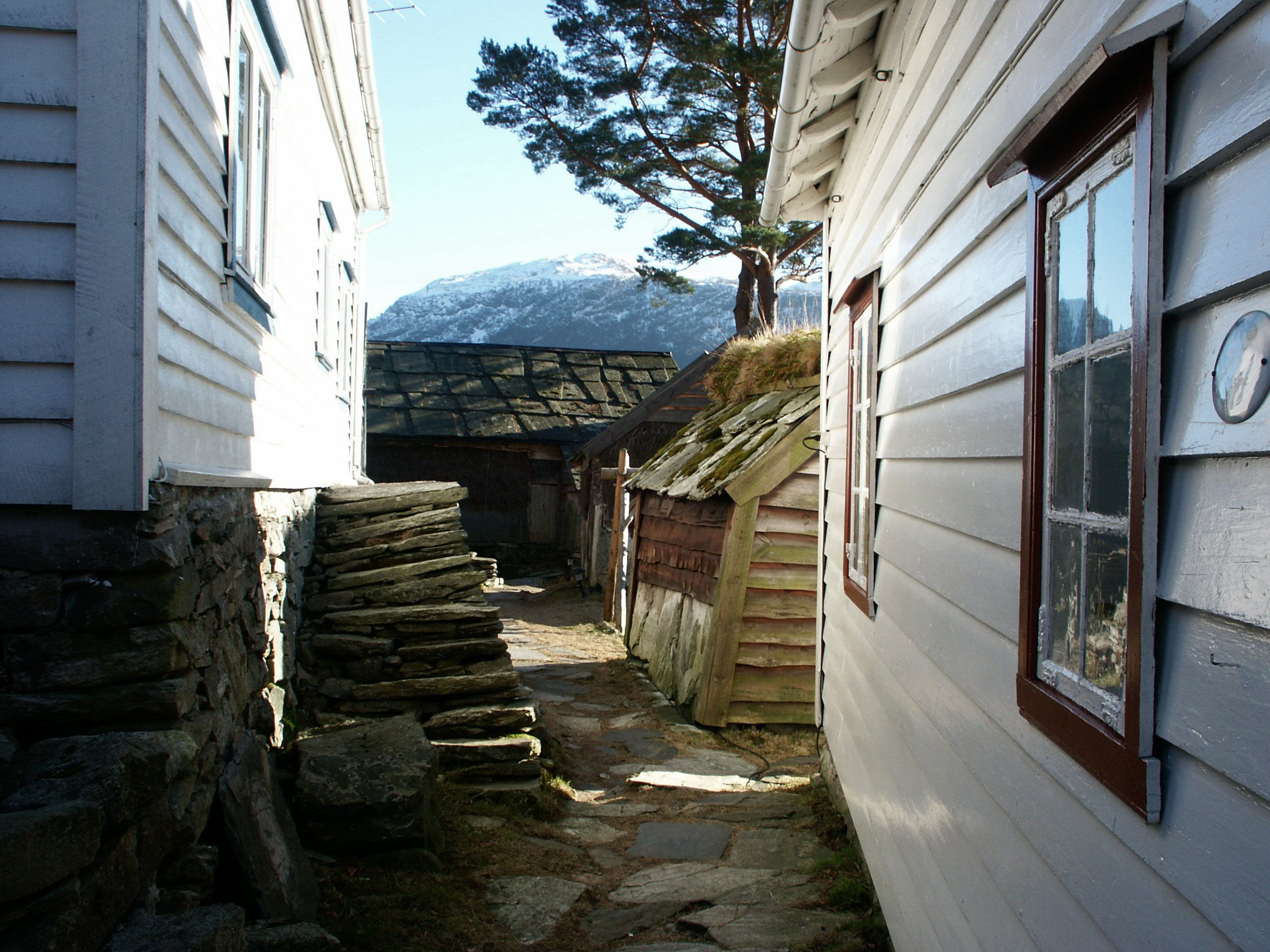
Havretunet between the houses

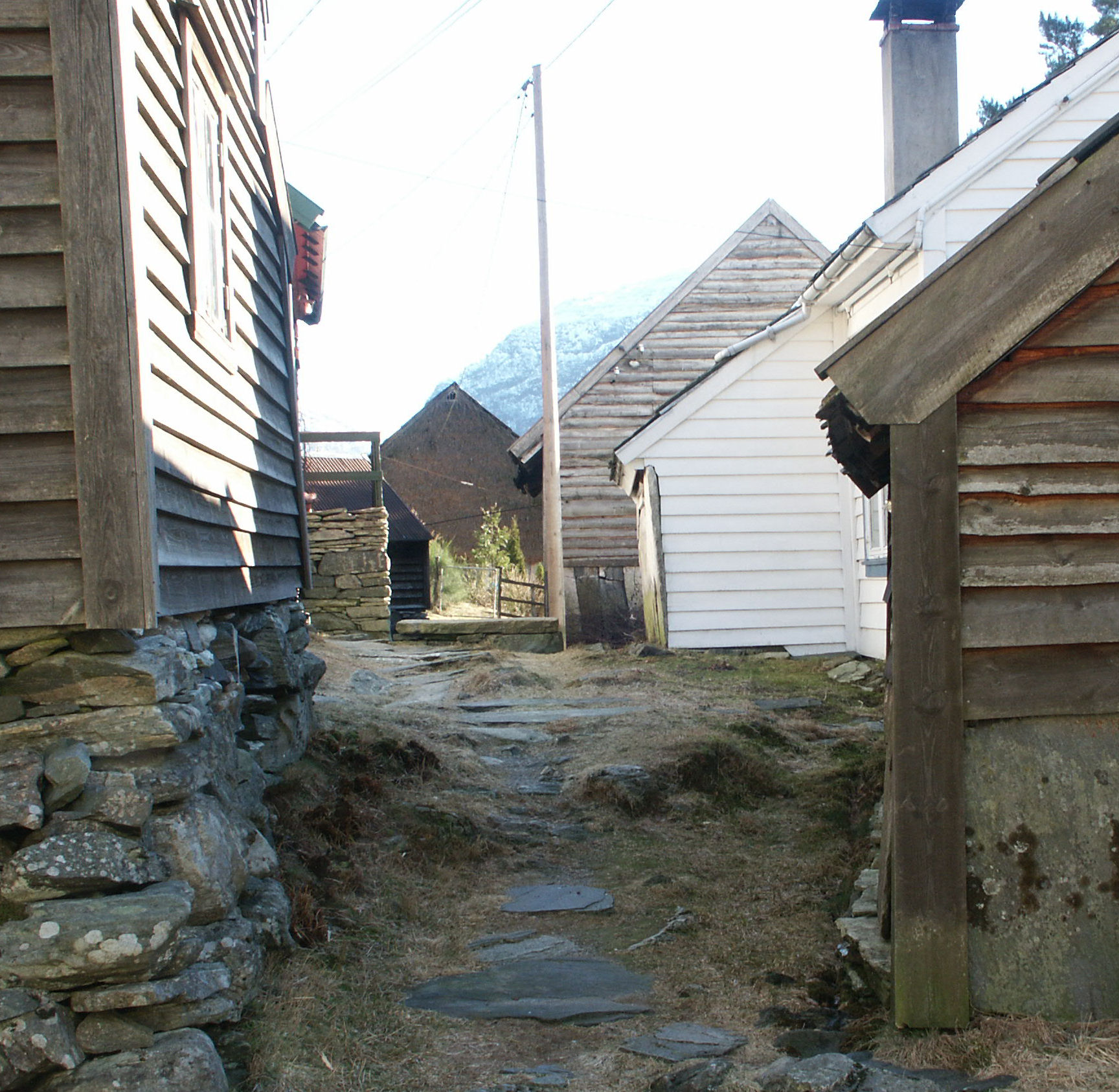
Havretunet between the houses

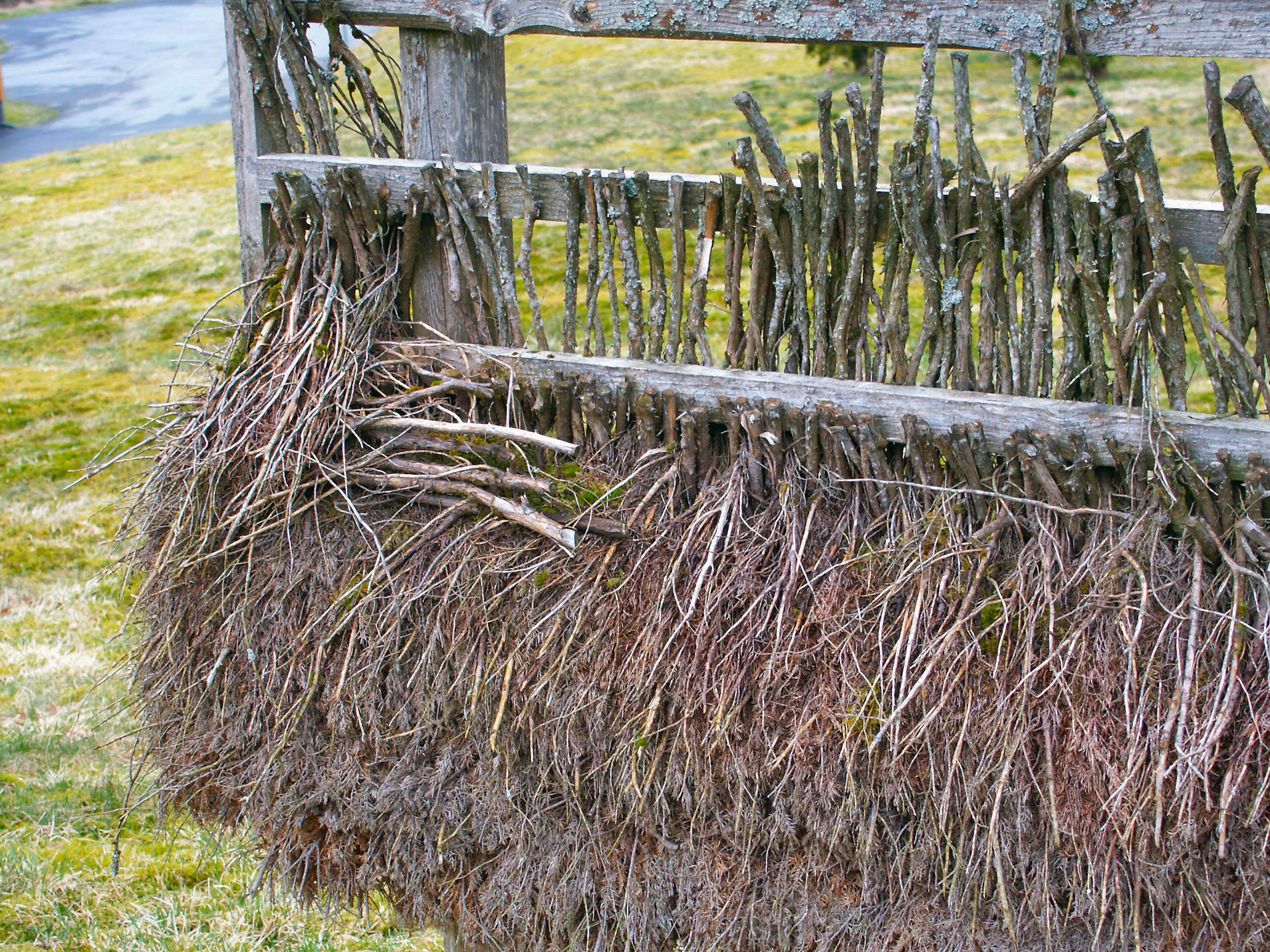
A demanding technique, but the cladding lasts for 30–50 years

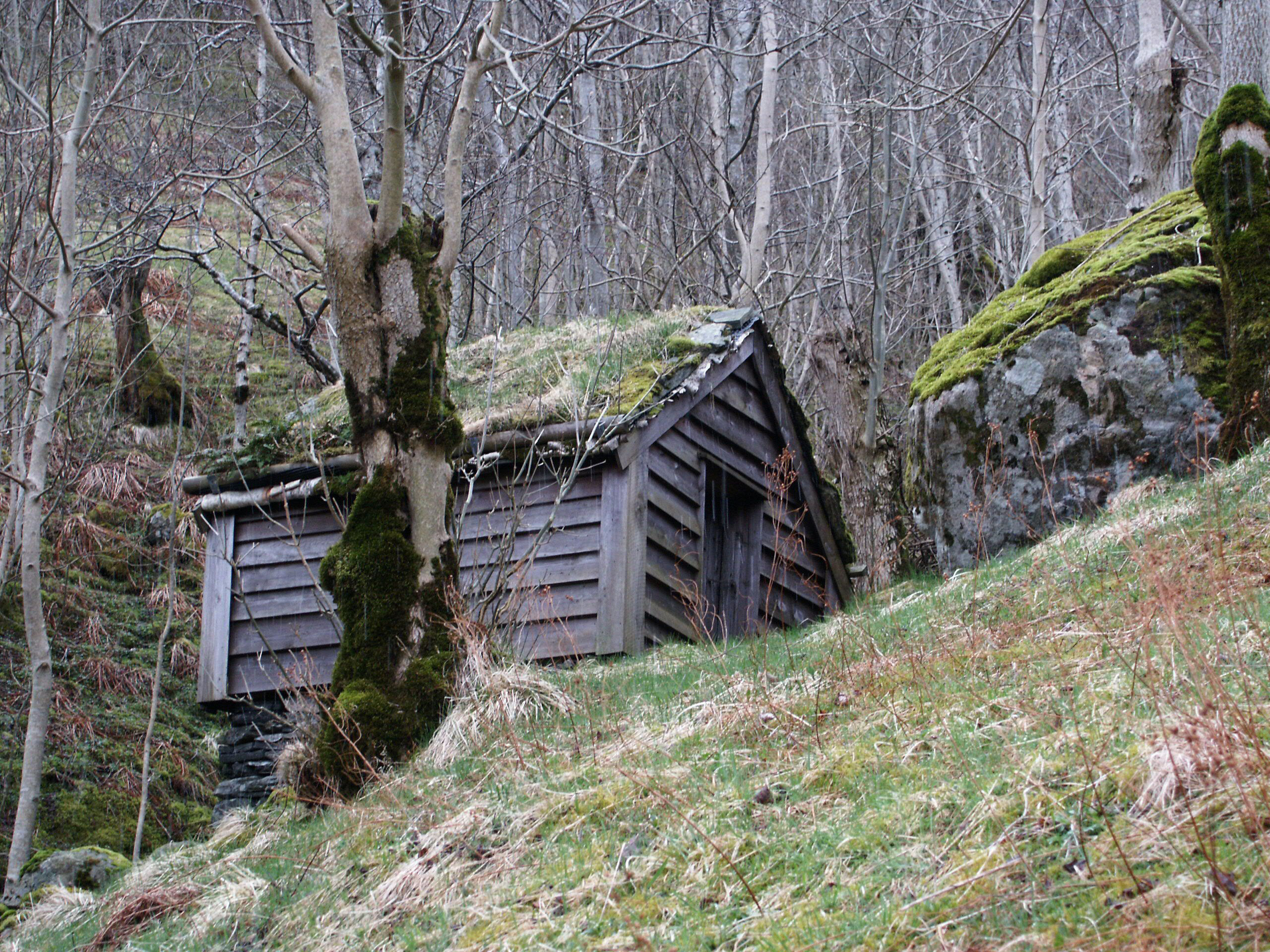
water mill

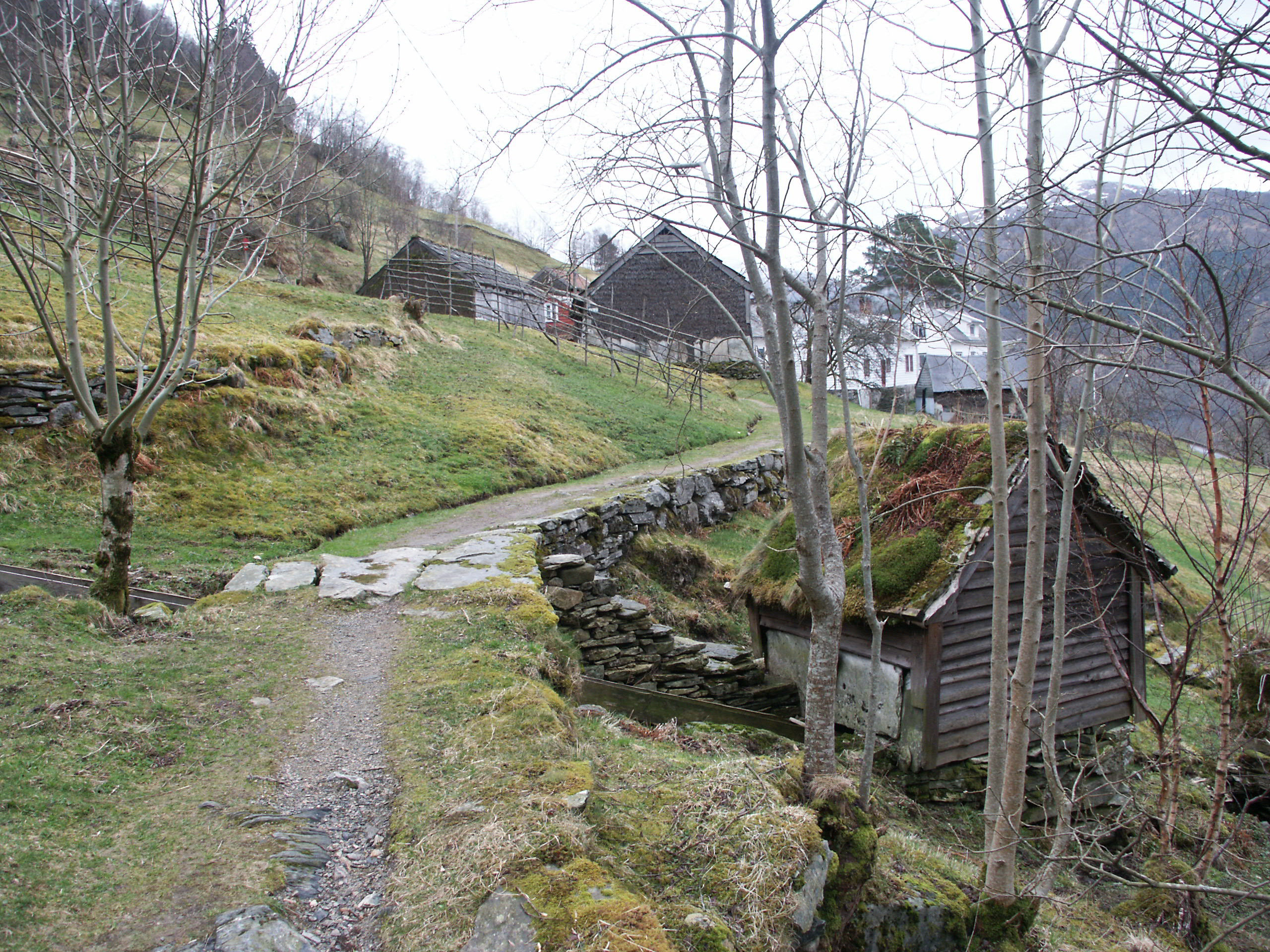
The mills are near the houses

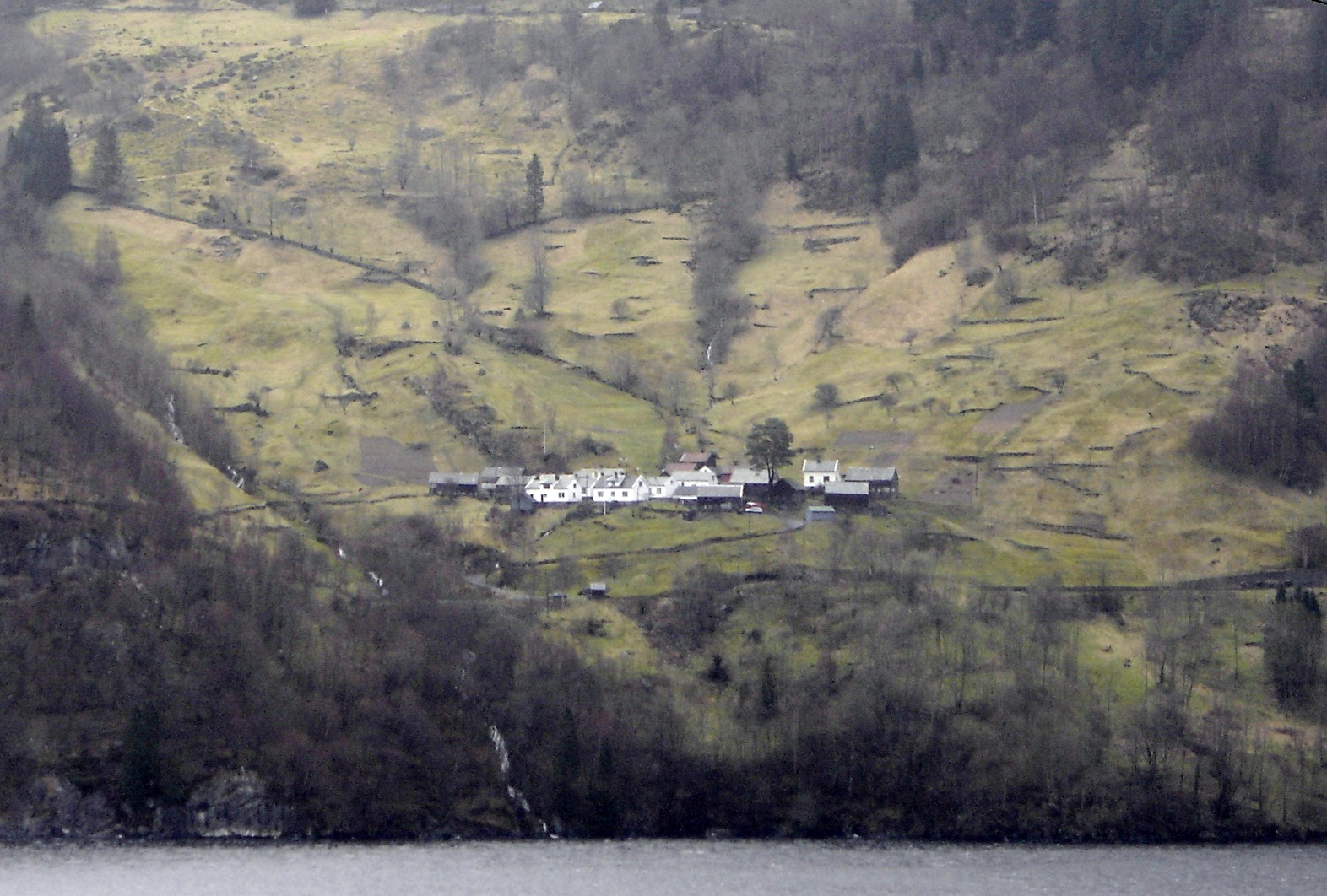
Havretunet from across Sørfjord, near Romslo

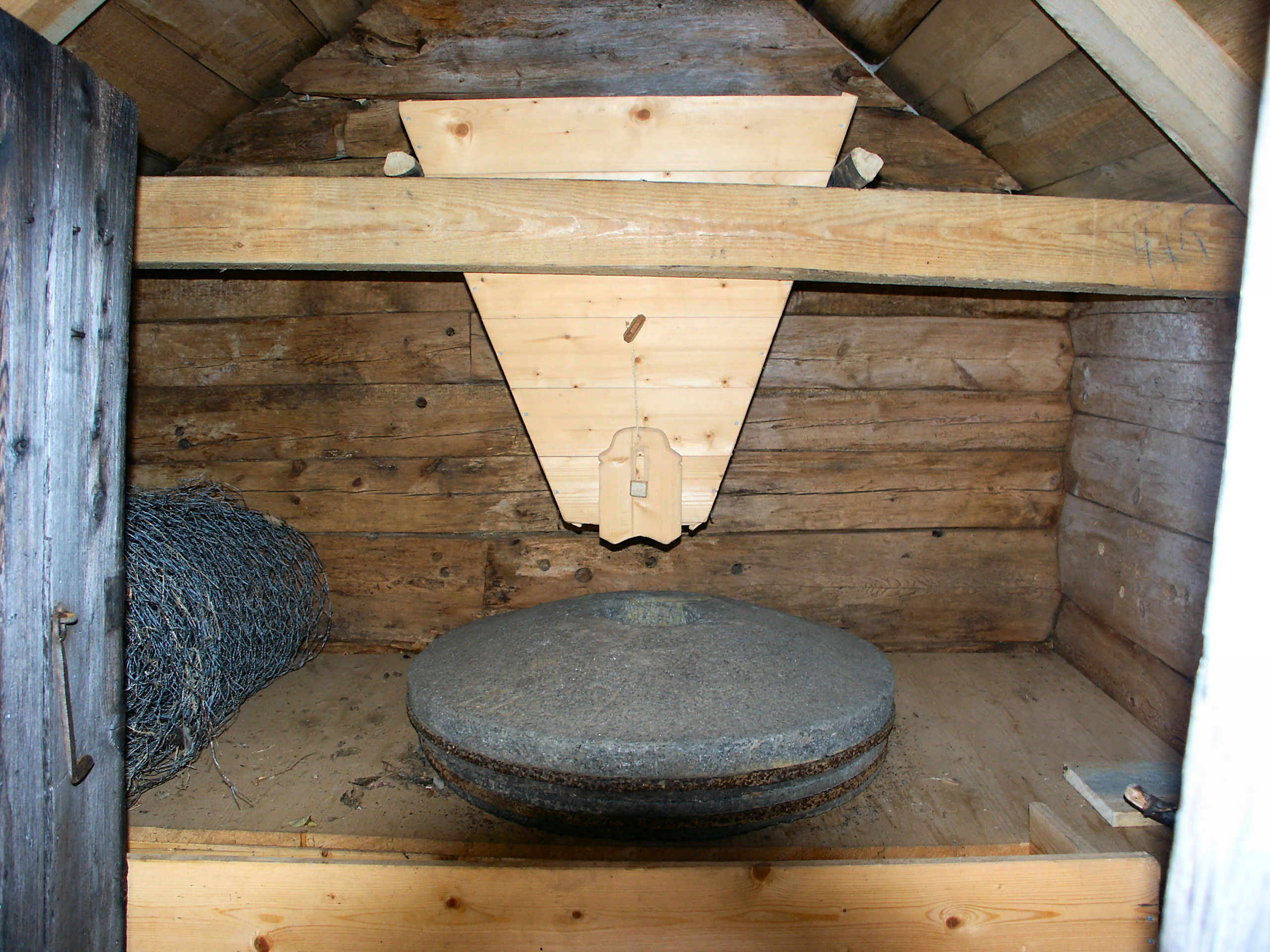
The grain is poured into the tract and the flavour is gathered on the desktop surrounding millstones and is wiped down to a bin in the front of the table

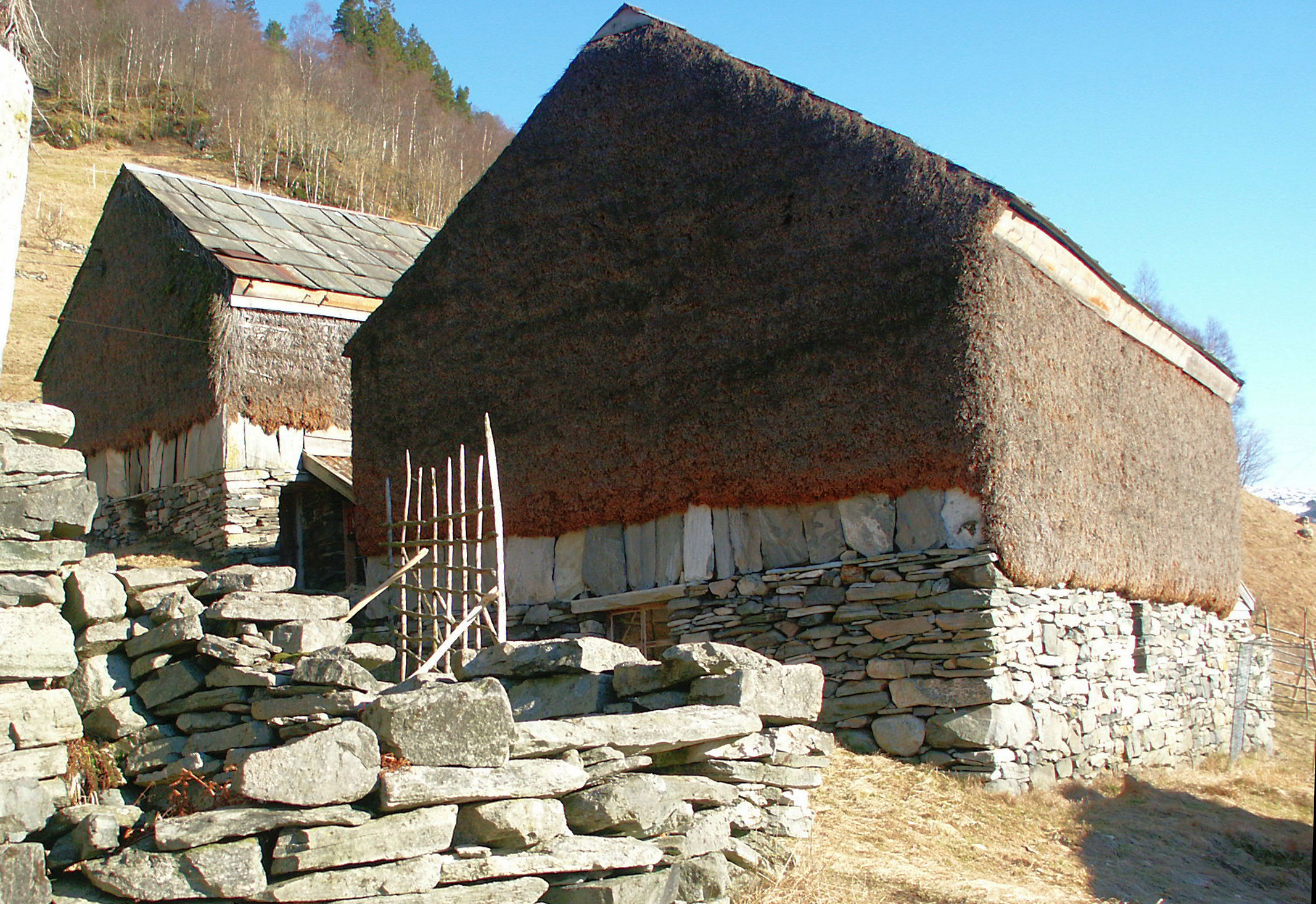
Weather exposed barn walls clad with juniper. Juniper keeps the lashing rain out, permits draft and keeps the hay dry.

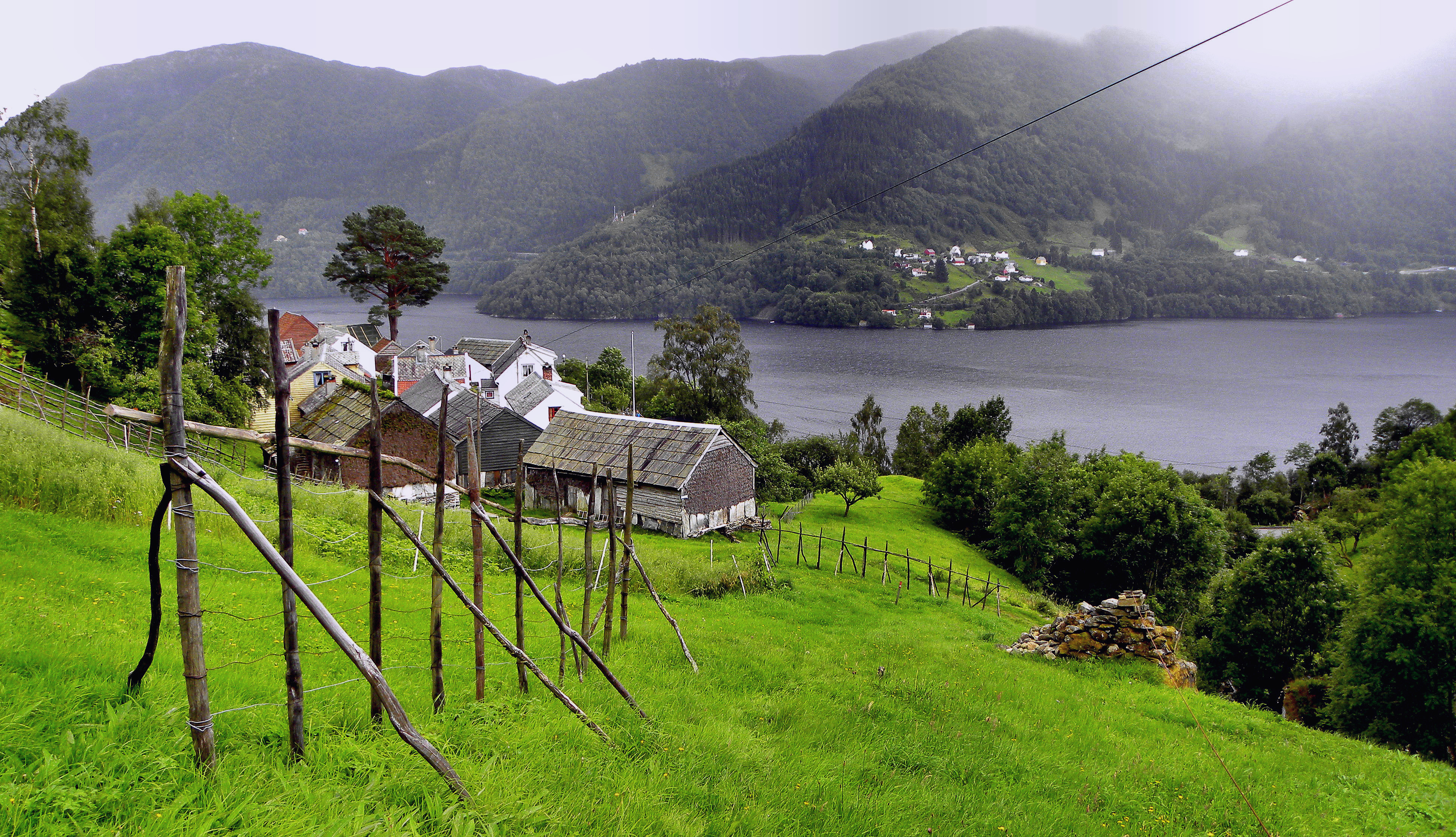
View of the traditional fencing

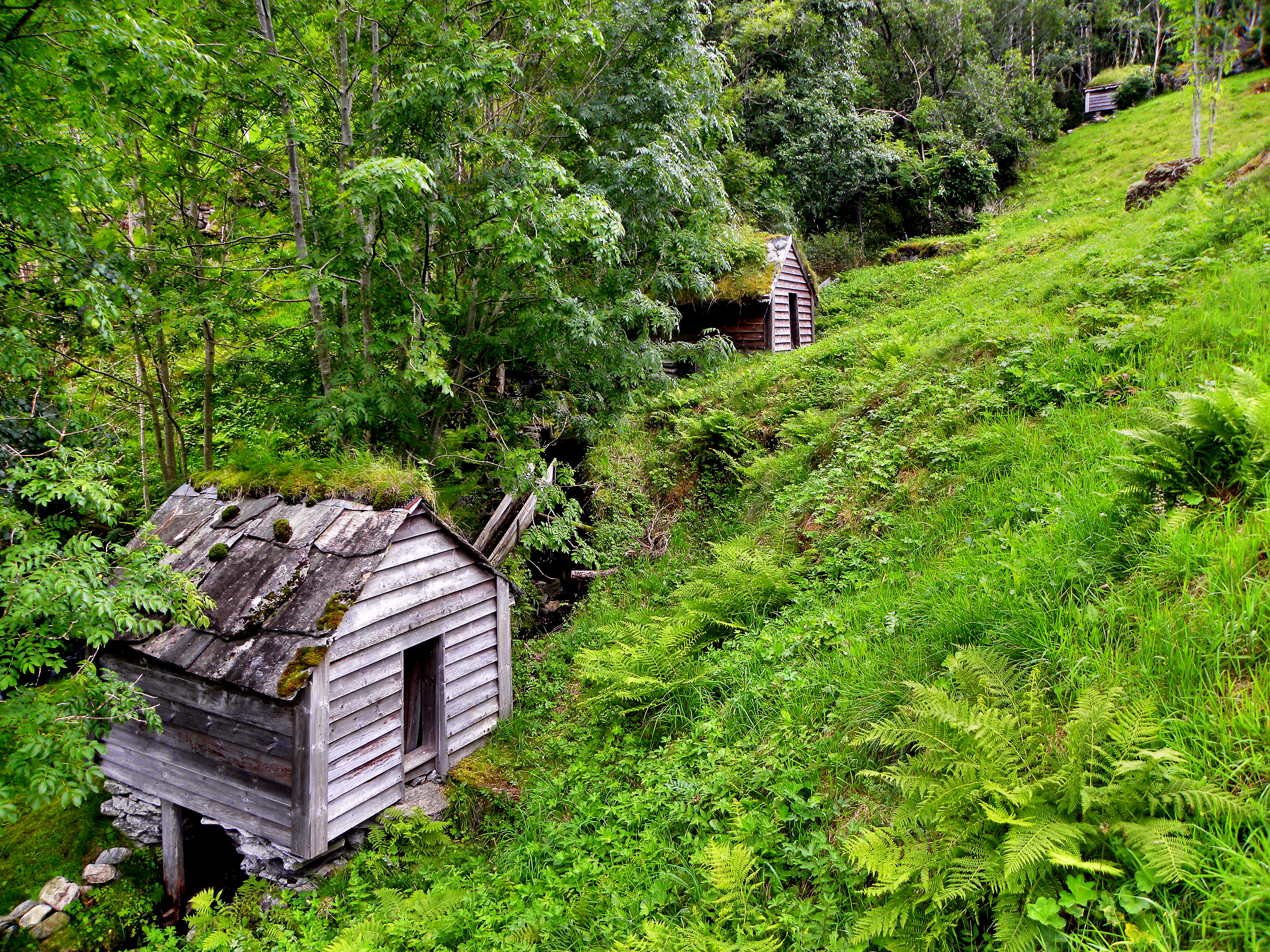
Mill houses

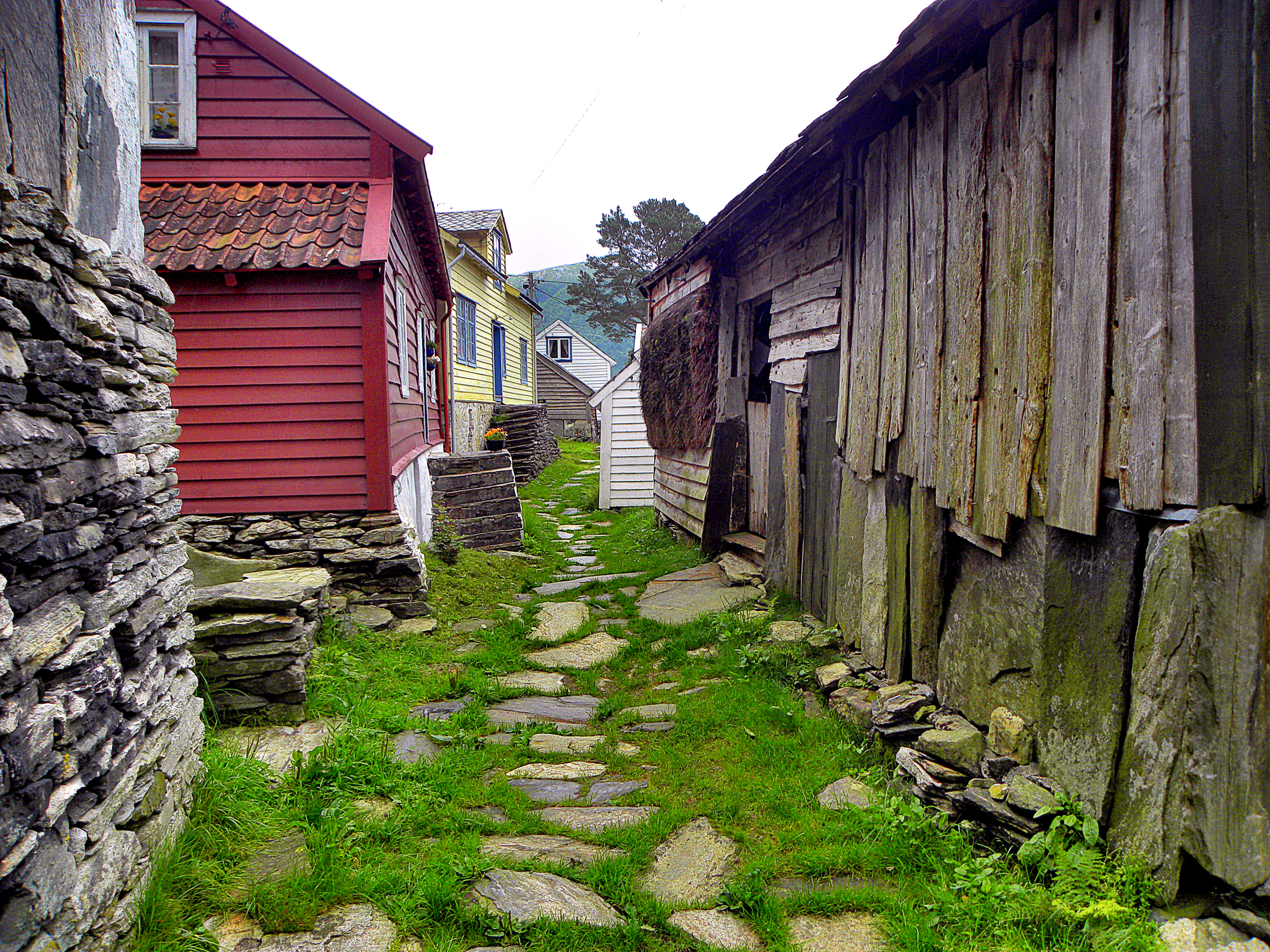
Main path through the farm area

== See also ==
- Strip farming in Norway
- movie "Two Lives" (2012) - scenes filmed at Havra farm
