= The Great Transformation (Norway) =

Period of intense change in Norwegian society from the mid-to-late 19th century

The Great Transformation (Norwegian: Det store hamskiftet) was a period of intense change in Norwegian society during the mid-to-late 19th century. During this time most Norwegian farmers ended their traditional self-sufficient lifestyle and become more specialized. Strip farms were consolidated under several Land Consolidation Acts, and new farming equipment was introduced. The country became more industrialized, and many people in rural areas began migrating to towns and cities or emigrating to the United States. The Norwegian term was introduced by Norwegian writer Inge Krokann.
