= Salhus, Vestland =

Village in Vestland county, Norway

Coordinates: 60.5069°N 5.26944°E

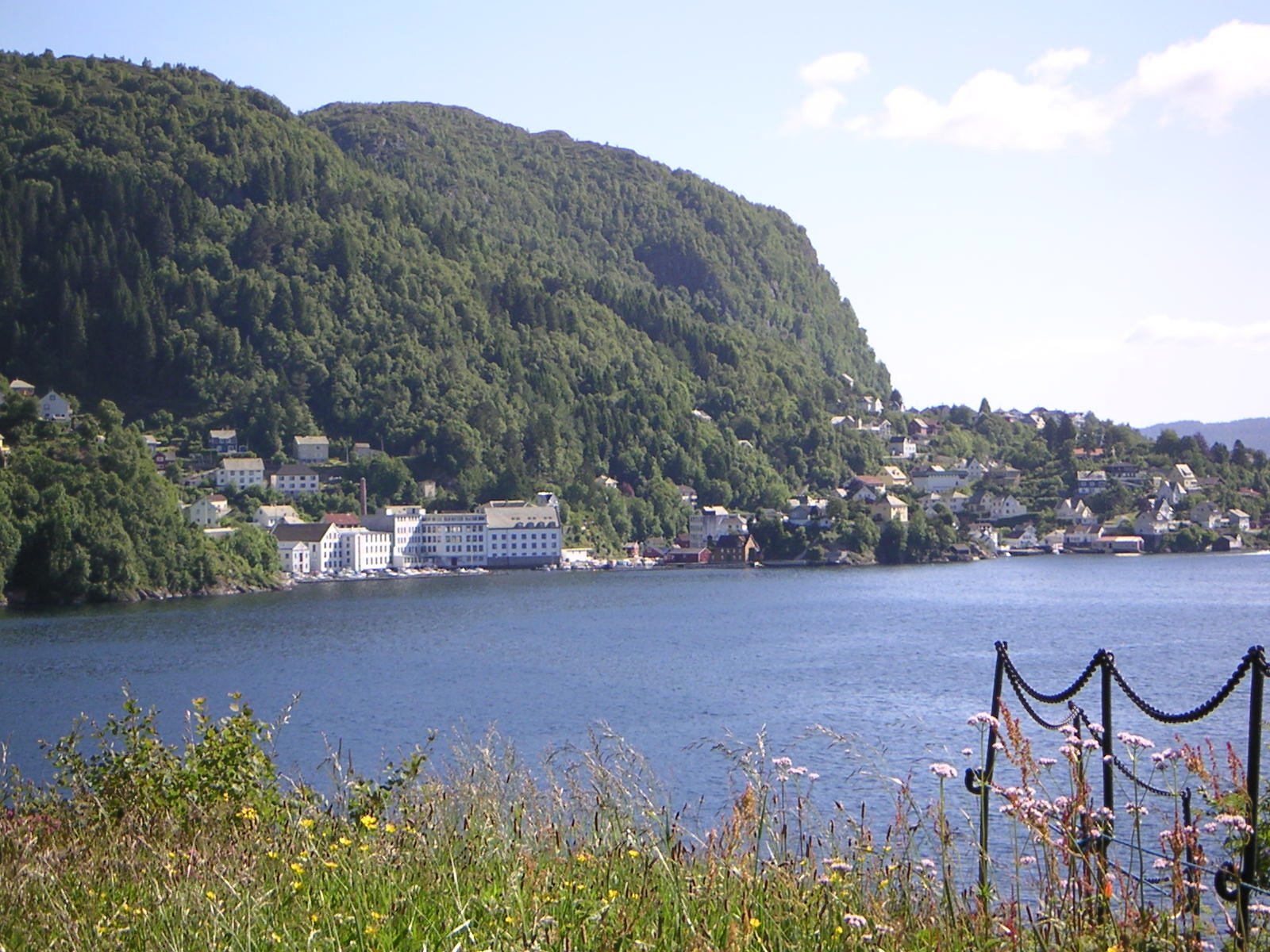
View of Salhus

Salhus is an urban settlement in the borough of Åsane in Bergen municipality, Vestland county, Norway. Salhus is located approximately 15 kilometres (9.3 mi) north of the city centre of Bergen. Salhus sits along the shore of the Salhusfjorden on the northern part of the Bergen Peninsula. The village area is located along Norwegian County Road 564, just east of the European route E39 highway and the southern end of the Nordhordland Bridge.

== Name ==
Salhus comes from the Old Norse word "Sálúhusn" which means the place with an innkeeper, and it is possible that the name has a connection with the many "Sálúhus" that King Øystein Magnusson had put up for the road travelers.

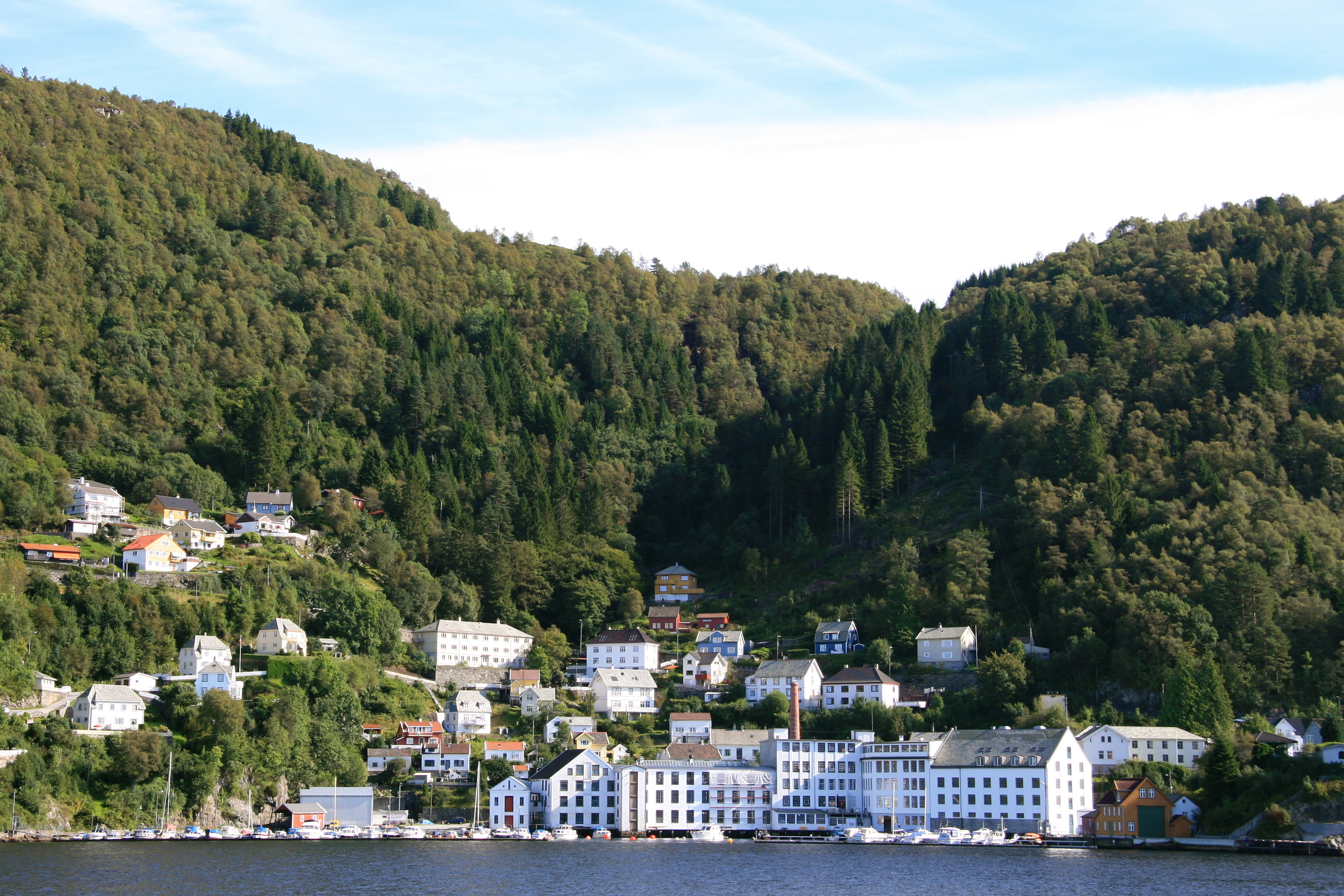
Salhus and the former knitwear factory Salhus Tricotagefabrik (now The Textile Industry Museum).

== History ==
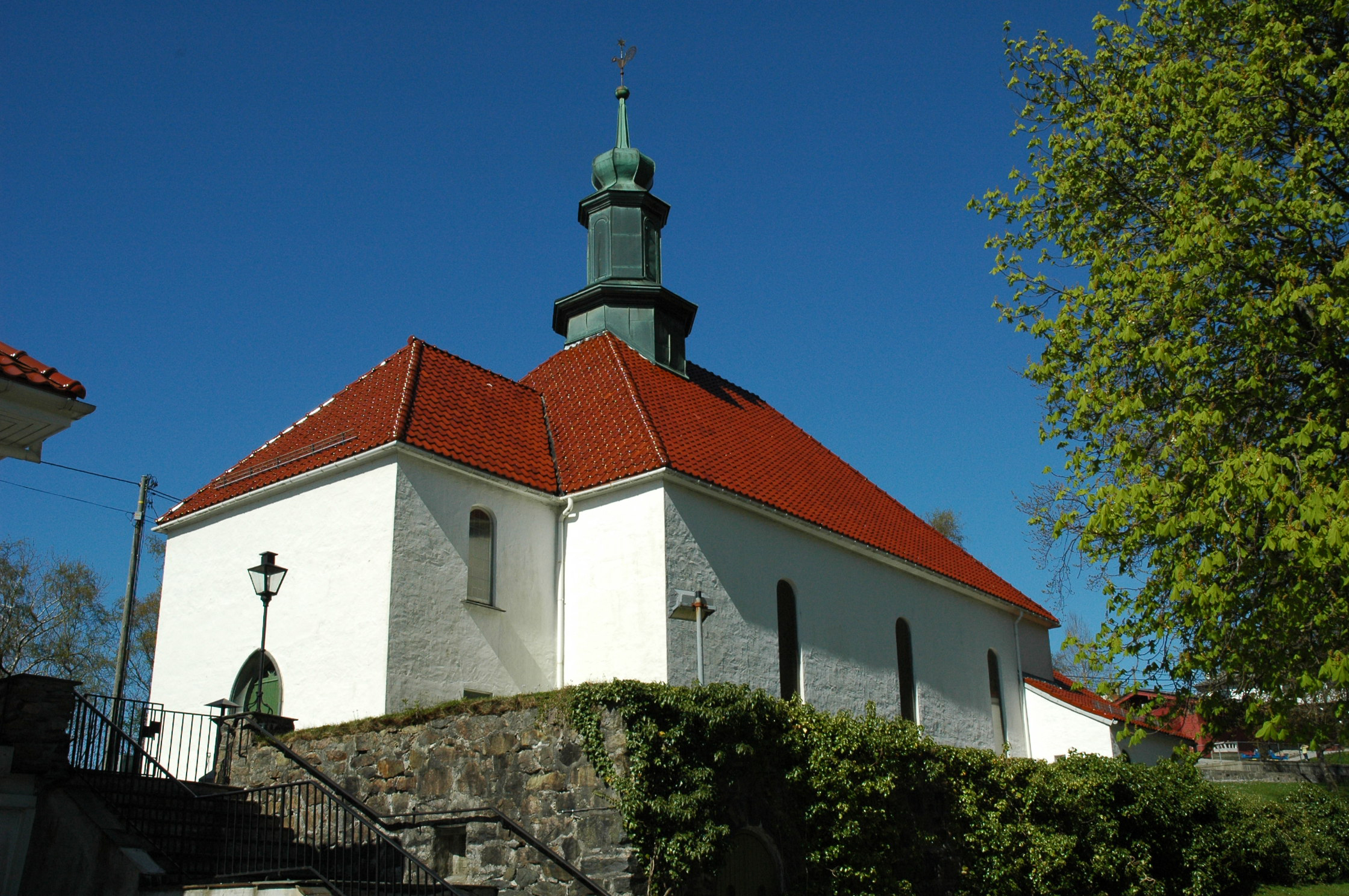
Salhus Church

Salhus was known for its textile industry, the knitwear factory Salhus Tricotagefabrik (1859-1989) was the first, followed by Salhus Væverier and Birkelund Trikotasjefabrikk. Today The Textile Industry Museum is located in the former Salhus Tricotagefabrik. From 1954 until 1985, Salhus had a ferry connection across the Salhusfjorden to Frekhaug and Alverstraumen.

At its peak, Salhus had 3 grocery stores, a bank, a post office, several lodging houses with a liquor license where the local fishermen from Nordhordland used up their money on their way home from selling their fish at the fish market in Bergen.

Salhus Church (Salhus kirke) was built in 1923-1924 as a chapel for the village of Salhus, mainly from means provided by the local population. It is situated beautifully in Storåkervika by the Salhusfjorden. In connection to the church, there is a graveyard that was constructed in 1916, prior to the church building. This is one of four churches in the borough of Åsane today.

Salhushallen has been synonymous with cultural activities, and even after Salhus has lost the place as the local node with all public services needed, the cultural scene is still very much alive.

Salhus has had two famous bands, Salhuskvintetten and Vinskvetten, previously known as "Salhusvinskvetten". The name Salhus is also known from the local athletics team IL Norna-Salhus.
