= Salhuskvintetten Olkabilamo =

Band from Norway

Salhuskvintetten OLKABILAMO was a band from Salhus, Åsane in Bergen, Norway formed in 1950 by Monrad Holm Johnsen.

== History ==
Monrad Holm Johnsen came from Sandviken to Salhus in 1930 and became active in both sports and in the local man's choir. He started a band for a revue. This was the beginning of the band, and he wanted to continue. The three women in the band quit, but the rest wanted to continue, and they formed Salhuskvintetten, although they didn't have a name at the beginning, and were called "Cowboygjengen" (Cowboygang) or "Salhus Cowboys".

It took 12 years before they became famous. In the start they just played on special occasions and in the yearly review in Salhus, but after they played "Singel og Sand" on radio in 1962 they turned into pop stars. It was Rolf Wesenlund from Norsk A/S Philips who spotted them and helped them get a contract with Philips. The single "Singel Og Sand" were on "VG-lista" for 27 weeks and sold 30,000 copies. They decided to call it a day after 23 years, 21 singles and 5 LPs. After that they have only played on special occasions. In the later years, three of them have died, Birger Martinussen in 1997, Monrad Holm Johnsen in 1998 and Lars Kalvik in 2000.

The band Vinskvetten started as a parody of Salhuskvintetten.

== Members ==
- Mondrad Holm Johnsen
- Ole Mjelde
- Karl Sjursen
- Birger Martinussen
- Lars Kalvik

== Discography ==
- Salhuskvintetten 1968 Philips
- Viser fra vest 1969 Philips
- Vi kjem att ... 1969 Philips
- Vestlandsviser 1971 Philips
- Viser ved vegkanten 1971 Philips
- Dei beste frå Salhuskvintetten 1977 Philips
- 20 Beste 2000 Tylden & Co as
