= Vinskvetten =

Norwegian musical group

Vinskvetten (previously known as Salhus Vinskvetten) is a Norwegian music and comedy troupe.

== History ==
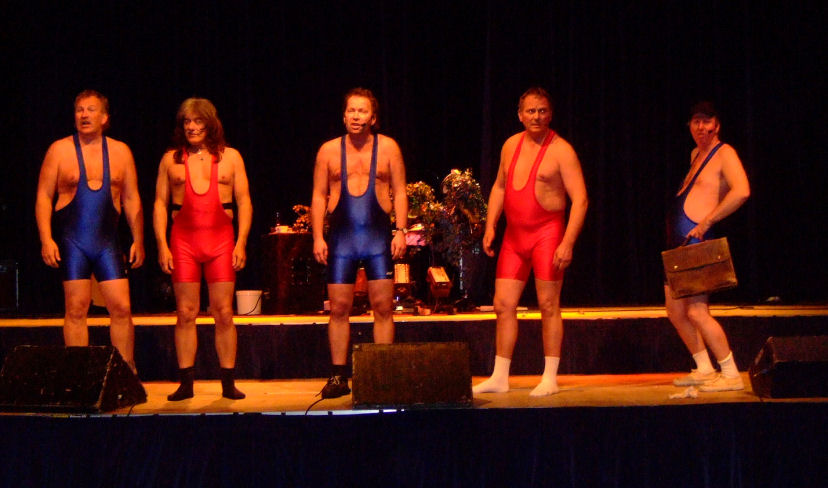
Vinskvetten in Stavanger. 2006

The group was formed in 1975 as part of a local comedy revue (Nornarevyen (Salhus Revy og Teater)), and has ever since been based in Salhus, north of Bergen in Norway. The group's name is a parody of another well known band from the same area, Salhuskvintetten. They first gained national fame in 1983, when they made the TV program Livet i Rothålå (Life in Rothålå), a mockumentary about the fictional town of Rothålå. This production would stay with both the band and its fans for the remainder of their career, and the band often use the town and its inhabitants as basis for their songs. In the late 1980s the band began recording their material, and their first two albums, released in 1988 and 1991, both went gold in Norway. They would go on to record seven albums, the last one in 2005. In 2008, the group announced their farewell tour, which played to sold-out crowds in Bergen during fall 2008 and winter 2009. The show was released on a DVD soon after, along with over two hours of bonus material from 1981 to 2007. The group subsequently retired.

Vinskvetten sings in a typical Northern Hordaland dialect referred to as "stril", which is local slang for a person from the outskirts of Bergen and their dialect, and they also use many "old" Nynorsk words and expressions in their lyrics.

== Members ==
The line-up went through many changes during the '70s and '80s, until a final roster was selected in 1986.

Final members (1986 - 2009):

- Bjørn Jensen alias "Bertel" – guitar and vocals (founding member),
- Jarle Farestveit alias "Hallstein" – accordion and vocals (founding member),
- Gunnar Låstad alias "Ruball" – bass and vocals,
- Arild Totland alias "Belbert" – drums and vocals,
- Øyvind Østerbø alias "Øyvind" – guitar and vocals,
- Gunnar Polden – light and sound technician.

Former members (until 1986):

- Steinar Toft
- Finn Langeland
- Knut Langeland
- Stein Langeland
- Bjørn Ivar Rusten
- Kjell Østerbø
- Roald Tellevik

== Discography ==
=== Albums ===
- 1988: "Platå" - Sold 25,000 (Gold record in Norway)
- 1991: "På Helså Laus" - Sold 25,212 copies (Gold record in Norway)
- 1994: "På Nye Eventy" - Sold 15,353 copies
- 1997: "Rånnyen og Kveitebollen" - Sold 32,402 copies (Gold record in Norway)
- 2000: "Dei Beste" (Greatest hits) - Sold 19,800 copies
- 2002: "Du Sa Det Va Forbi-bi-bi..." - Sold 12,162 copies
- 2005: "Stapp Mett" - Sold 7,000 copies

=== Singles ===
- 1984: Data-Dagros (single)
- 1990: Ein Heit Ekkel Sommarhitt (single)
- 2004: Daiane (single)

=== DVDs ===
- 2006: Stapp-Mett (DVD)
- 2009: No Kjem Dei Tre Siste (DVD)
