= Salhus Church =

Church in Vestland, Norway

- Salhus kirke
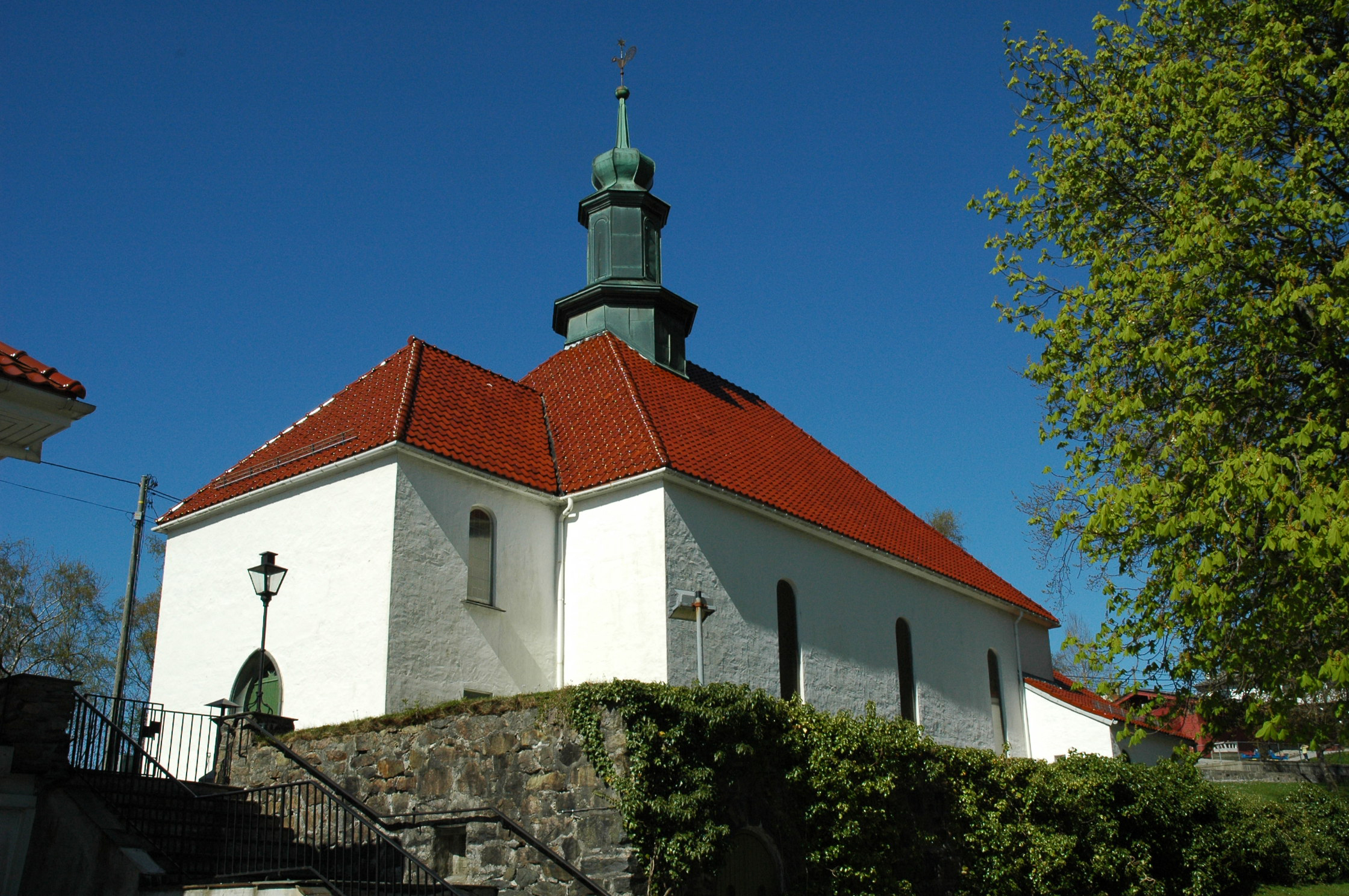
- View of the church
- Salhus Church
- 60°30′12″N 5°15′44″E
- Location: Bergen Municipality, Vestland
- Country: Norway
- Denomination: Church of Norway
- Churchmanship: Evangelical Lutheran

History
- Status: Parish church
- Founded: 1924
- Consecrated: 1924

Architecture
- Functional status: Active
- Architect: Ole Landmark
- Architectural type: Long church
- Completed: 1924 (102 years ago)

Specifications
- Capacity: 320
- Materials: Stone

Administration
- Diocese: Bjørgvin bispedømme
- Deanery: Åsane prosti
- Parish: Salhus
- Norwegian Cultural Heritage Site
- Type: Church
- Status: Listed
- ID: 85362

Salhus Church (Norwegian: Salhus kirke) is a parish church of the Church of Norway in Bergen Municipality in Vestland county, Norway. It is located in the Salhus neighborhood in the city of Bergen. It is the church for the Salhus parish which is part of the Åsane prosti (deanery) in the Diocese of Bjørgvin. The white, stone church was built in a long church design in 1924 using plans drawn up by the architect Ole Landmark. The church seats about 320 people.

== History ==
In 1916, a cemetery was established at Salhus. Soon after, the parish decided to build a chapel at the cemetery. Ole Landmark was hired as the architect for the new building. The chapel was built in 1924 and originally, it was an annex chapel to the main Åsane Church. The building is a stone long church with a rectangular nave with a hipped roof and church porch on the southwest side of the nave and a choir with a semi-circular apse in the northeast. There were matching sacristies on either side of the choir. In 1982, the Åsane parish was divided so that Salhus Chapel became a full parish church, called Salhus Church.

== See also ==
- List of churches in Bjørgvin
