= Strip farming in Norway =

Norwegian strip farming is a variation on the agricultural open field system practiced in much of the rest of Europe from medieval to modern times. In collective farmsteads where every farmer owned or rented a part of the farm, the properties become complicated. The home fields were divided into small strips and each family maintained rights to both the fertile and marginal fields. Outlying fields were not divided but kept in commons.

In the years after the black death, Norway developed, in contrast to most European countries, a particular farm tenure with free and partly independent farmers. Whereas Central Europeans lived in villages, in Norway the rural population lived in communal farmsteads. Since the population had a relatively strong growth through the eighteenth century there was an increase in subdividing farms.

== Eastern Norway ==
In eastern Norway, the development was distinguished by the strong expansion of the cotters system until its culmination around 1850.

A cotters farm was often established because one of the brothers who had odel (usually the eldest brothers exclusive right to inherit the whole farm) gave a cotters farm to his other brothers and to provide for their families.

In this agrarian society, farmland was the principal source of wealth. Those not having a farm might risk their life as legdeslem (a kind of rural, social security). These rural migrant laborers circulated from farm to farm in a district where the people—by law—had an obligation to provide food and accommodation, usually in a barn. This system resulted in strong socioeconomic inequality over time.

== Western and southern Norway ==
In western and southern Norway, farms were subdivided into plots or strips. This resulted in many small fields of various quality on the same farmstead. Meadows were also divided in this manner. To ensure each stakeholder had a fair portion, the strips were distributed according to size and quality. Often, these strips were rotated among the stakeholders to disincentivize unequal land divisions, this was called årsskifte (annual shift). The custom in western and southern Norway was that the home fields of differing purposes consisted of a complex variety of strips spreading oftentimes to the other farm subdivisions in the collective farmstead. The outlying fields were used as commons. In the fall and spring, they were used for grazing. This system often resulted in disagreement over the management, distribution, and use of the farmland.

== Redistribution reform ==
The growth in population forced an increasing subdividing of land, and the individual holdings belonging to each individual household on the collective farmstead, was more or less placed by randomly.

The rugged terrain of southern and western Norway further exacerbated the fracturing of farmsteads. As far back as the Gulatingslova (Law from the Gulating in about 900 AD) land distribution has been legally regulated, reflecting the problems involved in strip farming and Norwegian land tenure.

A redistribution reform was commenced with Norway's first redistribution law in 1821, the land consolidation act. Its purposes were to gather all the strips into more coherent and larger pieces of land to individual homesteads and to move the farmhouses to the respective homesteads. The purpose was to prepare for more rational and effective farming. The redistribution reform is more or less completed for infield, but not for outlying fields. The jordskifteloven (the land consolidation act) went through a major revision in 1979.

== See also ==
- Flurbereinigung
- Havretunet
- Otternes
- Open field system
