= Cluster farm =

Traditional western Norwegian farm settlement

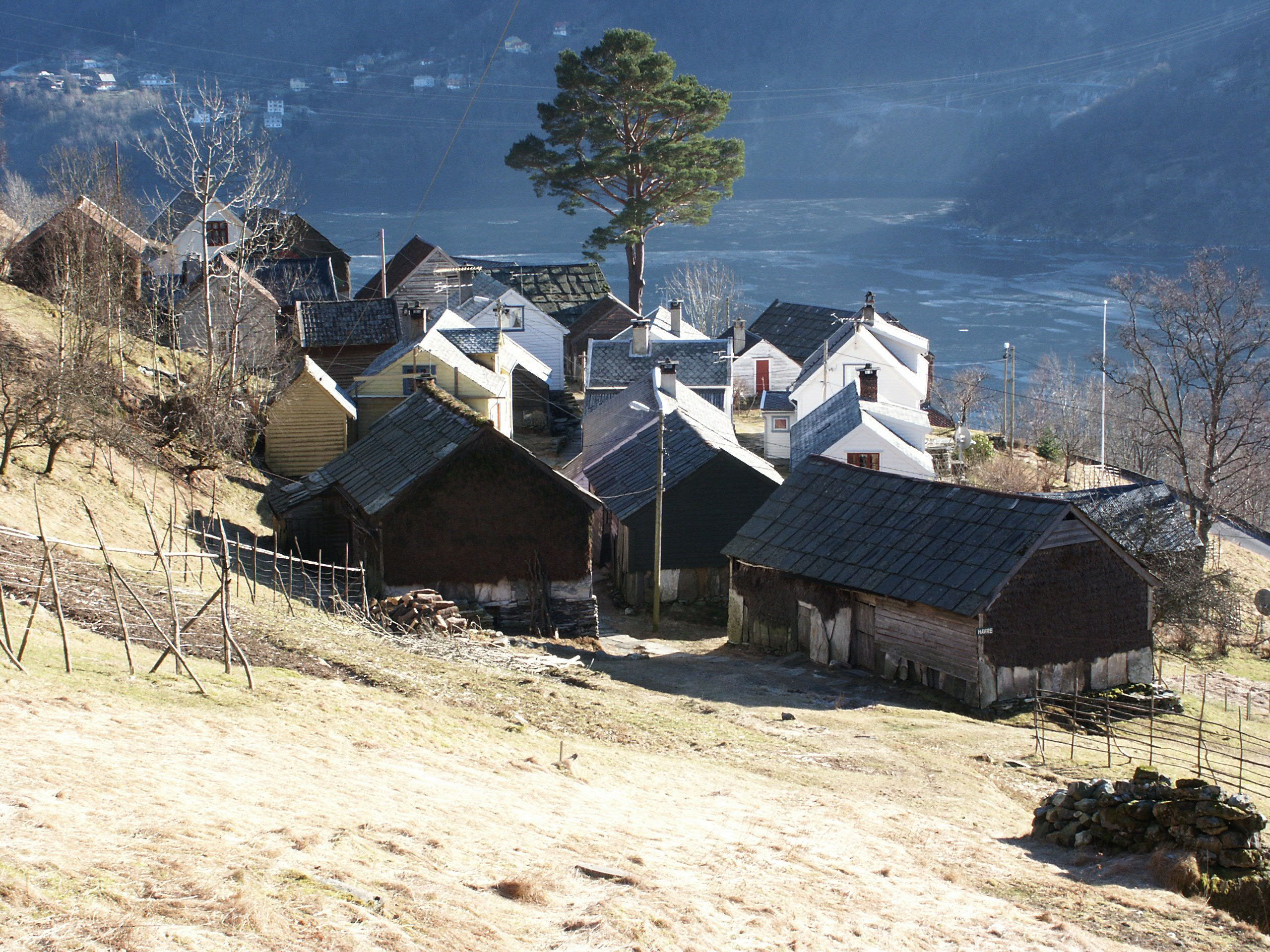
Havrå, a cluster farm

A cluster farm (Norwegian: klyngetun) is a traditional western Norwegian farm settlement with multiple individual farms and with the houses of the various farms located close together, more or less irregularly in relation to one another, and so that it is difficult to see any regular pattern.

Typical examples of cluster farms include Havrå on the island of Osterøy, Agatunet in the Hardanger district, Henjum in Hermansverk, Tyssedalen in Fjaler Municipality, Osmundnes in Gloppen Municipality, Sjønstå in Fauske Municipality, and remaining parts of Larsbakken in Fjaler Municipality.

Cluster farms originated through repeated division of farms. The division was to be made fairly and so every single field plot was therefore divided. The plots of land therefore became increasingly smaller, and each user received an increasingly complex property to deal with.
