= Massai Mbili =

Artists collective

Maasai Mbili is a group of artist-activists based in Kibera, Kenya. The Maasai Mbili collective was founded in 2001 by the artists and painters Otieno Gomba and Otieno Kota. Both artists designed and sold narrative signs. In 2003 they acquired a permanent studio, based in Kibera, a large informal settlement in the capital Nairobi. In Kiswahili "Maasai Mbili" means Two Maasai. The collective started its activities with the abbreviated title "M2". Nowadays the collective comprises about 20 members, painters, sculptor, photographers, moviemakers, poets, and writers.

== Art gallery ==
Maasai Mbili is not just an art store but also an archive and a laboratory for creative processes. The centre offers opportunities für workshops and performances, for teaching and collaboration. It also serves as a marketplace for ideas and a public source for inspiration.
