= The Textile Industry Museum =

Coordinates: 60°30′29″N 05°16′19″E

- Tekstilindustrimuseet
- Location within Norway
- Former name: Norsk Trikotasjemuseum
- Established: 1992
- Location: Salhusvegen 201, 5107 Salhus, Bergen, Norway
- Type: Industrial museum
- Website: www.muho.no/tekstilindustrimuseet

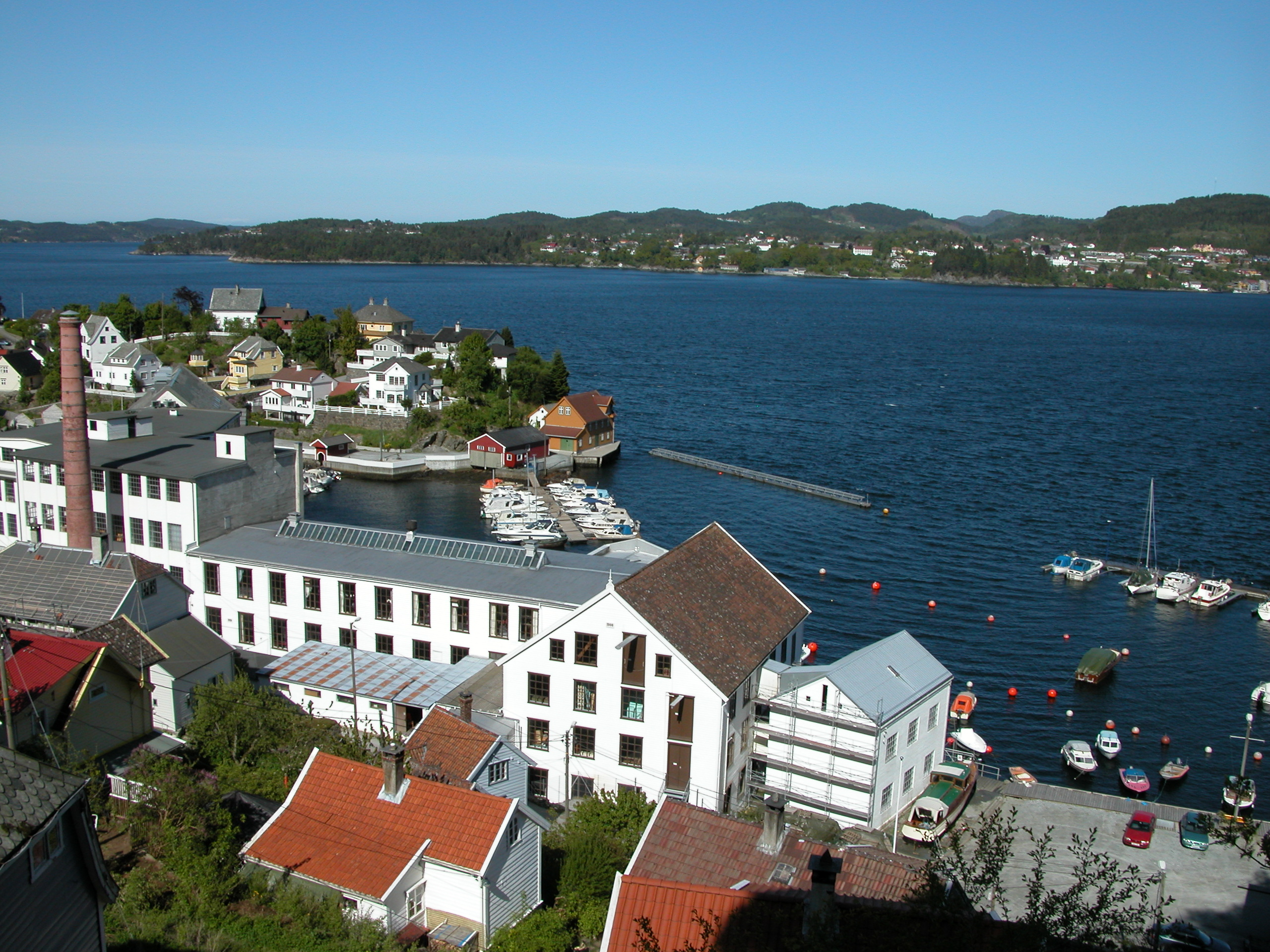
The former knitwear factory Salhus Tricotagefabrik, where the museum is located.

The Textile Industry Museum is a museum in Salhus, Bergen, Norway. It is within the former knitwear factory Salhus Tricotagefabrik, a national industrial heritage site. The museum was founded in 1992, and officially opened in 2001. It focuses on education, documentation of and research into the Norwegian knitwear- and textile industry. In 2020 the factory buildings were protected by The Norwegian Directorate for Cultural Heritage.

== Knitwear factory becomes museum ==
The museum's history is directly connected to Salhus Tricotagefabrik. The textile mill was established in 1859 as one of the first knitwear factories in Norway, and closed in 1989. And as the factory was closing, the idea of an industrial museum in Salhus became reality.

By the mid-1980s, the Norwegian textile industry was in decline, and the cultural heritage sector recognised the importance of preserving the long history of the Norwegian textile industry, especially in the Bergen area, which had been central to Norwegian knitwear production. In 1987, Arts Council Norway initiated the creation of a plan for the protection of machines, facilities and sites from the extensive knitwear industry in Hordaland, and through the County Conservator a survey was made of sites for weaving mills and knitwear factories in the county.

In the end, Salhus Tricotagefabrik was chosen for protection, above all because of its authentic factory premises, and surrounding social functions such as workers' housing, schoolhouse and a nursing home for former workers. The survey also highlighted the fact that machinery, equipment and the company archives had been preserved. With an intact production line, one could follow the production process from raw wool or cotton to finished garments. Thus everything was in place for the establishment of a museum in Salhus, and in 1992 the museum was founded. Some years later, The Norwegian Directorate for Cultural Heritage created a list of ten national industrial heritage sites, which would come to include Salhus Tricotagefabrik.

== 1992–2001: restoration period ==
In 1992, most operations at the knitwear factory had stopped, and the significant task of cleaning up, restoring and documenting the old factory premises began. Parts of the factory building were in poor condition, and building maintenance is still one of the most labor-intensive tasks for The Textile Industry Museum. The 1990s were above all a starting phase until the museum officially opened its doors to the public in 2001.

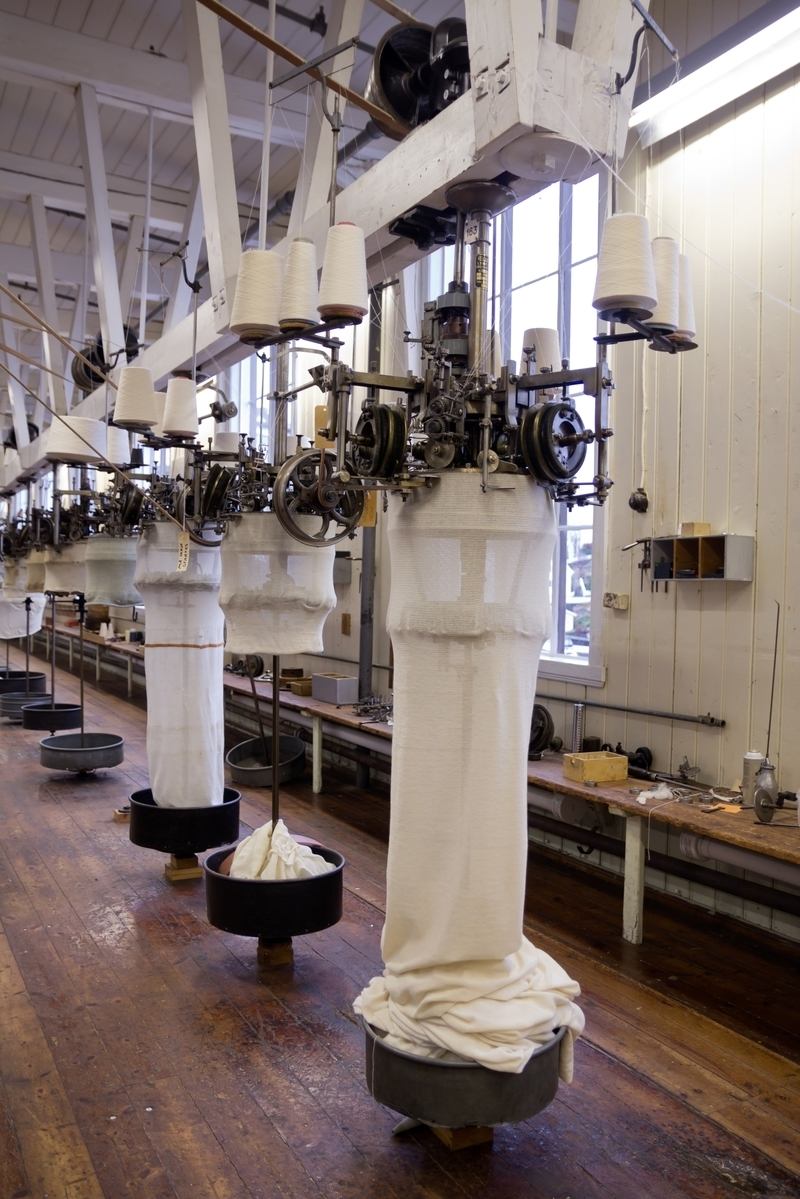
Circular knitting machines in the knitting department at Salhus Tricotagefabrik, now The Textile Industry Museum.

== The collections ==
When the factory closed, the machinery and large parts of the factory archives were still intact. The factory premises form the core of the museum's collections, as well as several buildings connected to its operations, and social life in the factory town: workers' housing (1860), a schoolhouse (1873), a teacher's residence and the first director's residence. The latter would go on to become "Kveldheim", a nursing home for former workers and now houses the administrative offices for the Museum Centre in Hordaland. The museum has clothes and textiles produced at the factory in Salhus, including the underwear brand Krone Maco, and other textile-related objects and documentation in its collections.

The Textile Industry Museum has a large collection of machines for various processes in the production of knitted textiles, washing, dyeing, carding, spinning, winding, and knitting, to cutting, sewing, quality control, and packing. These are mainly from the factory in Salhus, but also from other textile factories in the Bergen region, and other parts of the country. Around 160 of these are exhibited at the premises.

== Education ==
The Textile Industry Museum offers guided tours of Salhus Tricotagefabrik, following the production line in the factory from wool to finished garments, via carding, spinning, knitting and sewing. The development of Salhus as a factory town and the processes of industrialisation are in focus: how the machines in the factory changed the conditions for work and production from the pre-industrial society to the industrial revolution. In recent years, the museum has focused on showing contemporary textile art, as well as other exhibitions relating to work, industry and textiles.

== Part of The Museum Centre in Hordaland ==
The factory buildings in Salhus are today home to several departments in The Museum Centre in Hordaland, including The Textile Industry Museum. Here you will also find The Conservation Department, The Cultural Heritage Service in Nordhordland, and the museum administration. The Museum Centre in Hordaland also has locations on the islands outside of Bergen: Havrå and Osterøy museum on Osterøy, The Heathland Centre at Lygra and The Western Norway Emigration Centre at Radøy.
