= List of municipalities in Hordaland, Norway =

Hordaland, Norway, until 1919 known as Søndre Bergenhus amt, was divided into 33 municipalities prior to 2020 when the county was merged into Vestland county. Traditionally, the county was divided into five districts: Hardanger, Voss, Sunnhordland, Midhordland, and Nordhordland. These districts do not have separate administrations and have no political powers. The municipality and city of Bergen, a separate county until 1972, is the county capital of Hordaland.

Municipality	Notes	District	Area in km^{2}	Population (2009)	Map
Askøy Municipality	Askøy was established as a municipality 1 January 1838. Laksevåg Municipality was separated from Askøy in 1918. Most of Herdla Municipality was merged with Askøy in 1964.	Midthordland	100 km²	24,432	
Austevoll Municipality	Austevoll was separated from Sund Municipality in 1886.	Midthordland	117 km²	4,417	
Austrheim Municipality	Austrheim was separated from Lindås Municipality on 1 January 1910. Fedje Municipality was separated from Austrheim Municipality in 1947.	Nordhordland	57 km²	2,576	
Bergen Municipality	County capital, is divided into eight boroughs, the only administrative subdivision within a municipality in the county. Established as a municipality 1 January 1838. Bergen landdistrikt was merged into Bergen in 1877, Årstad Municipality in 1915, and Åsane Municipality, Arna Municipality, Fana Municipality and Laksevåg Municipality in 1972.	Midthordland	465 km²	252,051	
Bømlo Municipality	Finnås Municipality was divided into Bømlo Municipality, Bremnes Municipality, and Moster Municipality 1 July 1916. The latter two were merged with Bømlo Municipality in 1963.	Sunnhordland	246 km²	11,085	
Eidfjord Municipality	Eidfjord Municipality was separated from Ulvik Municipality 1 May 1891. Eidfjord Municipality was a part of Ullensvang Municipality from 1964 until 1977.	Hardanger	1,493 km²	945	
Etne Municipality	Etne Municipality was established as a municipality 1 January 1838. Most of Skånevik Municipality was merged with Etne Municipality in 1965.	Sunnhordland/ Haugalandet	735 km²	3,854	
Fedje Municipality	Fedje Municipality was separated from Austrheim Municipality in 1947.	Nordhordland	9 km²	596	
Fitjar Municipality	Fitjar Municipality was separated from Stord Municipality in 1860.	Sunnhordland	143 km²	2,908	
Fjell Municipality	Fjell was established as a municipality 1 January 1838.	Midthordland	148 km²	21,507	
Fusa Municipality	Fusa Municipality was separated from Os Municipality in 1856. Hålandsdal Municipality and Strandvik Municipality were separated from Fusa Municipality in 1903, but merged into Fusa Municipality again in 1964.	Midthordland	379 km²	3,791	
Granvin Municipality	Granvin was established as a municipality 1 January 1838 (originally it included the main parish of Granvin and the annex of Ulvik. In 1858, Ulvik became the main parish, and Granvin an annex so the municipal name was changed to Ulvik Municipality. Granvin was separated from Ulvik as a municipality of its own 1 May 1891.	Hardanger	213 km²	950	
Jondal Municipality	Jondal Municipality was separated from Strandebarm Municipality in 1846.	Hardanger	210 km²	1,022	
Kvam Municipality	Vikør was established as a municipality 1 January 1838. In 1912, the name was changed to Kvam Municipality. Strandebarm Municipality was merged with Kvam in 1965.	Hardanger	616 km²	8,338	
Kvinnherad Municipality	Kvinnherad was established as a municipality 1 January 1838. Fjelberg Municipality, most of Varaldsøy Municipality and parts of Skånevik Municipality, were merged with Kvinnherad Municipality in 1965.	Sunnhordland	1,135 km²	13,112	
Lindås Municipality	Lindås was established as a municipality 1 January 1838. Masfjorden Municipality was separated from Lindås Municipality on 1 March 1879. Austrheim Municipality was separated from Lindås Municipality in 1910. Alversund Municipality, and parts of Hamre Municipality and Hosanger Municipality, were merged with Lindås Municipality in 1964.	Nordhordland	476 km²	14,036	
Masfjorden Municipality	Masfjorden Municipality was separated from Lindås Municipality on 1 January 1879.	Nordhordland	556 km²	1,652	
Meland Municipality	Meland Municipality was separated from Alversund Municipality in 1923. The northern part of Holsnøy was transferred from Herdla Municipality to Meland Municipality in 1964.	Nordhordland	93 km²	6,478	
Modalen Municipality	Modalen Municipality was separated from Hosanger Municipality in 1910. The middle part of Eksingedalen was transferred from Modalen Municipality to Vaksdal Municipality in 1964.	Midthordland	412 km²	351	
Odda Municipality	Odda was established as a municipality 1 July 1913. Røldal Municipality was merged into it on 1 January 1964.	Hardanger	1,616 km²	7,025	
Os Municipality	Os was established as a municipality 1 January 1838. Fusa Municipality was separated from Os Municipality in 1856. Samnanger Municipality was separated from Os Municipality in 1907.	Midthordland	140 km²	16,437	
Osterøy Municipality	Osterøy was established as a new municipality 1 January 1964, after the merger of large parts of Bruvik Municipality, Hamre Municipality, Haus Municipality and Hosanger Municipality.	Midthordland	93 km²	7,352	
Radøy Municipality	Radøy was created as a new municipality on 1 January 1964, after the merger of large parts of Hordabø Municipality, Manger Municipality and Sæbø Municipality, and smaller parts of Austrheim Municipality and Lindås Municipality.	Nordhordland	112 km²	4,825	
Samnanger Municipality	Samnanger Municipality was separated from Os Municipality in 1907.	Midthordland	269 km²	2,379	
Stord Municipality	Stord was established as a municipality 1 January 1838. Fitjar Municipality was separated from Stord Municipality in 1860. Valestrand Municipality was separated from Stord Municipality in 1868.	Sunnhordland	144 km²	17,289	
Sund Municipality	Sund was established as a municipality 1 January 1838. Austevoll Municipality was separated from Sund in 1886.	Midthordland	100 km²	5,899	
Sveio Municipality	Sveio Municipality was separated from Finnås Municipality in 1861. Vikebygd Municipality was separated from Svei Municipalityo in 1902. Valestrand Municipality and the western part of Vikebygd Municipality were merged with Sveio Municipality in 1964.	Sunnhordland/ Haugalandet	246 km²	4,906	
Tysnes Municipality	Tysnes was established as a municipality 1 January 1838.	Sunnhordland	255 km²	2,792	
Ullensvang Municipality	Ullensvang was an annex to Kinsarvik Municipality until 1869, when Ullensvang became the main parish, and Kinsarvik became an annex to Ullensvang. Kinsarvik Municipality and Odda Municipality were separated from Ullensvang as municipalities of their own 1 July 1913. Most of Kinsarvik Municipality was again merged with Ullensvang Municipality in 1964. Eidfjord Municipality was merged with Ullensvang Municipality in 1964, but was separated from Ullensvang in 1977.	Hardanger	1,399 km²	3,351	
Ulvik Municipality	Ulvik was an annex to Granvin Municipality until 1858, when Granvin became an annex to Ulvik. Granvin Municipality and Eidfjord Municipality were separated from Ulvik Municipality in 1891.	Hardanger	721 km²	1,095	
Vaksdal Municipality	Vaksdal was created as a municipality 1 January 1964, after the merger of parts of Bruvik Municipality, Evanger Municipality, and Modalen Municipality.	Midthordland	716 km²	4,110	
Voss Municipality	Voss was established as a municipality 1 January 1838. Vossestrand Municipality was separated from Voss Municipality in 1868. Evanger Municipality was separated from Voss Municipality in 1885. Vossestrand Municipality and most of Evanger Municipality were merged with Voss Municipality in 1964.	Voss	1,806 km²	13,868	
Øygarden Municipality	Øygarden was created as a municipality 1 January 1964, after the merger of Hjelme Municipality and parts of Herdla Municipality.	Midthordland	67 km²	4,223	
Total			15,460 km²	469,681	
