= Flatkvål =

Village in Vaksdal Municipality, Norway

Flatkvål Flatekvål
- Village
- Interactive map of Flatkvål
- Coordinates: 60.78488°N 5.9573°E
- Country: Norway
- Region: Western Norway
- County: Vestland
- District: Nordhordland
- Municipality: Vaksdal Municipality
- Elevation: 284 m (932 ft)
- Time zone: UTC+01:00 (CET)
  - Summer (DST): UTC+02:00 (CEST)
- Post Code: 5728 Eidslandet

Flatkvål (Norwegian pronunciation: [/fla:kol/]) is a village in the Eksingedalen valley of Vaksdal Municipality in Vestland county, Norway. The village lies along the river Storelvi, about 30 kilometres (19 mi) northeast of the village of Stamneshella. The Modalen Tunnel is located about 5 kilometres (3.1 mi) west of Flatkvål. The village of Nesheim lies about 15 kilometres (9.3 mi) to the east. Flatkvål is the site of Eksingedal Church.

== History ==
Flatkvål was administratively a part of Voss Municipality starting in 1838. On 1 January 1885 the northeastern half of the Eksingedalen valley was separated from Voss Municipality to form the new Evanger Municipality (this included Flatkvål). On 1 January 1964, all of the Bergsdalen and Eksingedalen valleys with 251 inhabitants combined were merged with most of Bruvik Municipality and a part of Modalen Municipality to create the new Vaksdal Municipality. The village of Flatkvål has been part of Vaksdal Municipality since that time.

== Media gallery ==
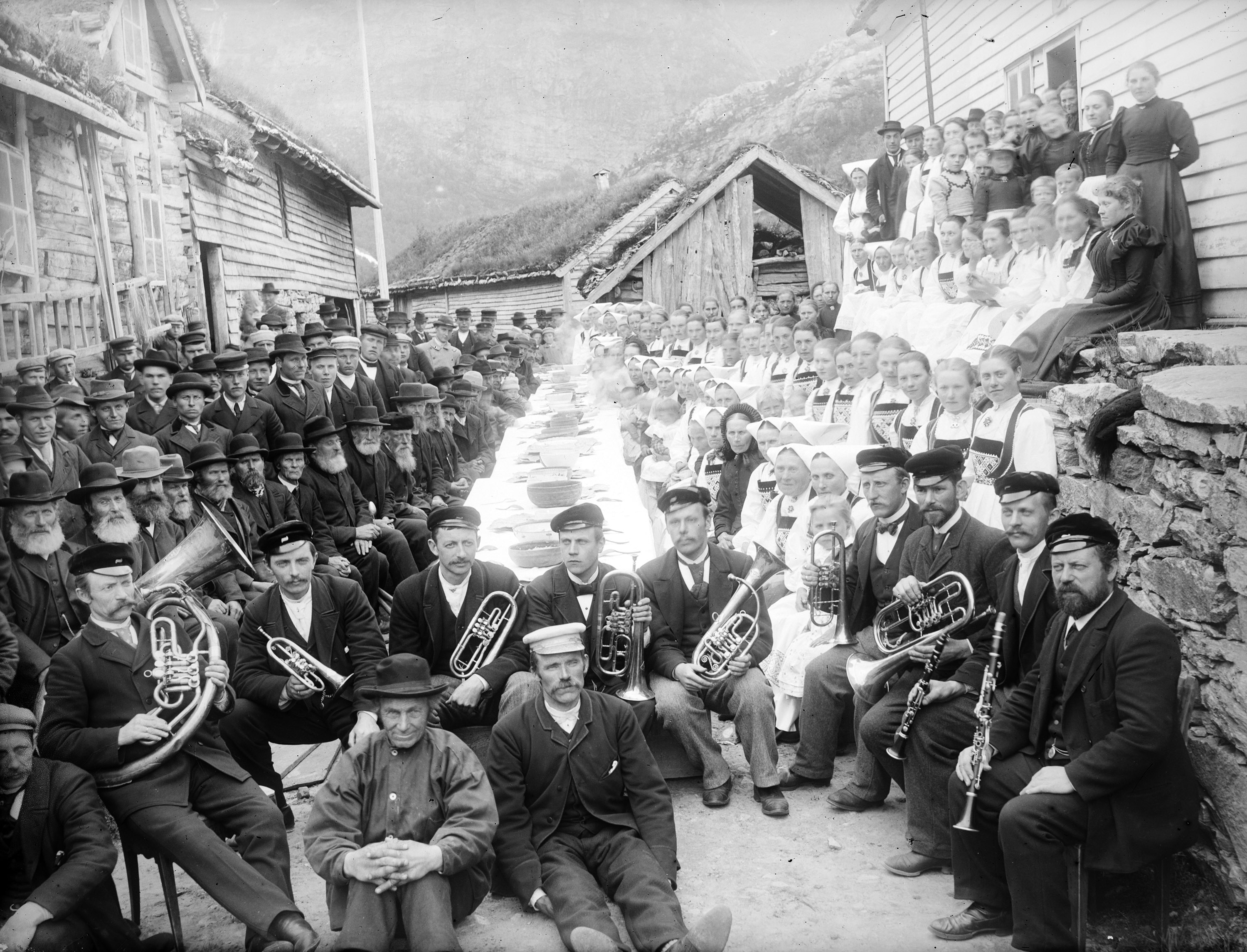
The people of the Eksingedalen valley celebrating that parts of the new road through the valley have been completed. The celebrations took place at Flatekval, ca. 1890.

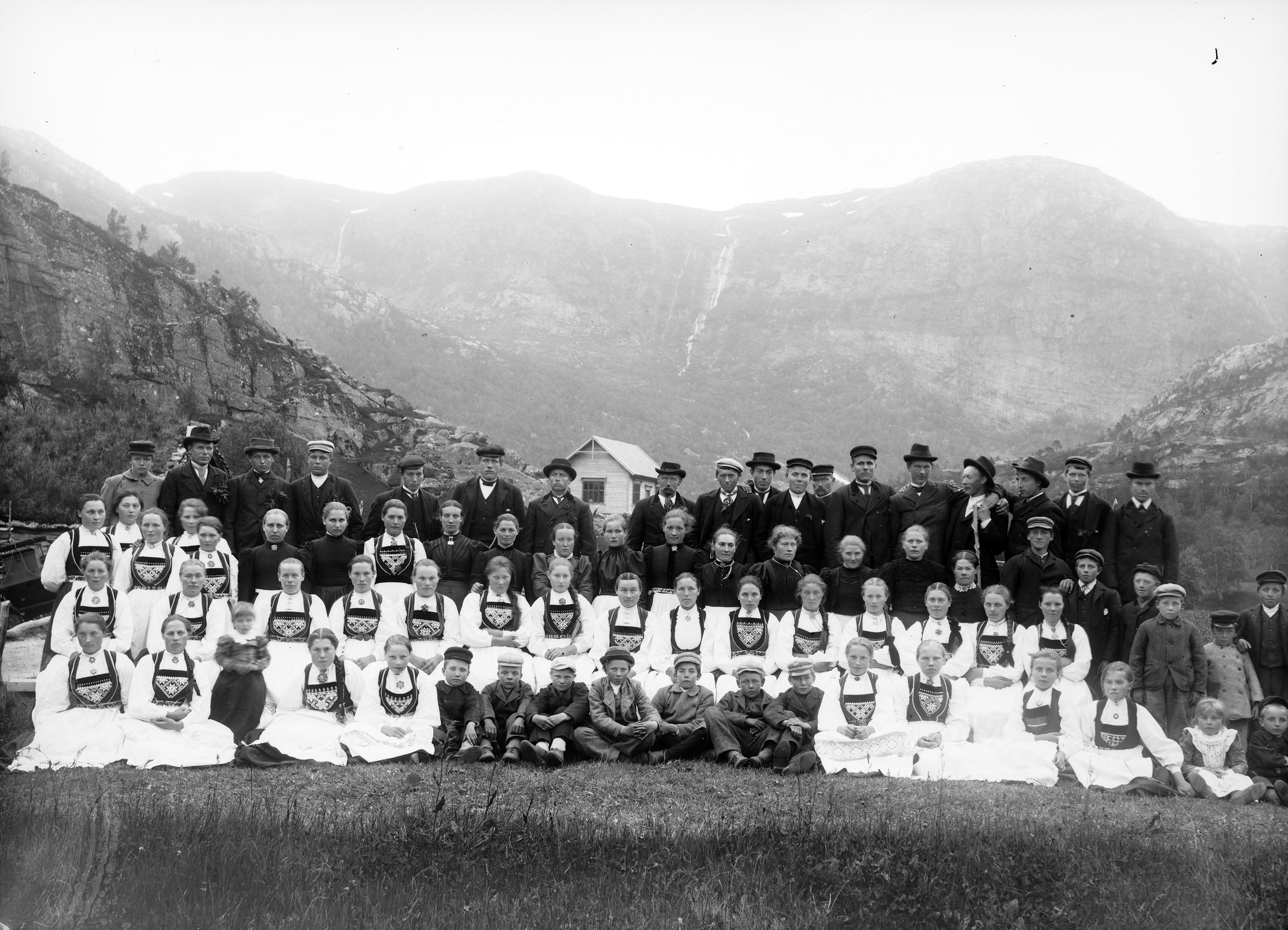
A group photo at another road-opening celebration in Flatekval in 1897.
