= Askjelldalsvatnet =

Lake in Vestland, Norway

- Askjellsdalsvatnet
- Interactive map of Askjelldalsvatnet
- Location: Vaksdal Municipality, Vestland
- Coordinates: 60.88868°N 6.18047°E
- Basin countries: Norway
- Max. length: 3.8 kilometres (2.4 mi)
- Max. width: 1.5 kilometres (0.93 mi)
- Surface area: 2.84 km^{2} (1.10 sq mi)
- Shore length^{1}: 10.49 kilometres (6.52 mi)
- Surface elevation: 805 metres (2,641 ft)
- References: NVE
- ^{1} Shore length is not a well-defined measure.

Askjelldalsvatn Dam

Askjelldalsvatnet is a lake in Vaksdal Municipality in Vestland county, Norway. The small lake lies at an elevation of 805 metres (2,641 ft) in the Vikafjell mountains between the Modalen and Eksingedalen valleys. The 2.84-square-kilometre (1.10 sq mi) lake has a dam at the southern end of the lake. The Askjelldalsvatnet dam is used to regulate the water level so that the water can be used for water power at a nearby power plant. The lake Skjerjavatnet lies about 1 kilometre (0.62 mi) to the west.

== See also ==
- List of lakes in Norway
