= Evanger Municipality =

Former municipality in Hordaland, Norway

Evanger Municipality Evanger herad
- Former municipality
- Ævanger herred (historic name)
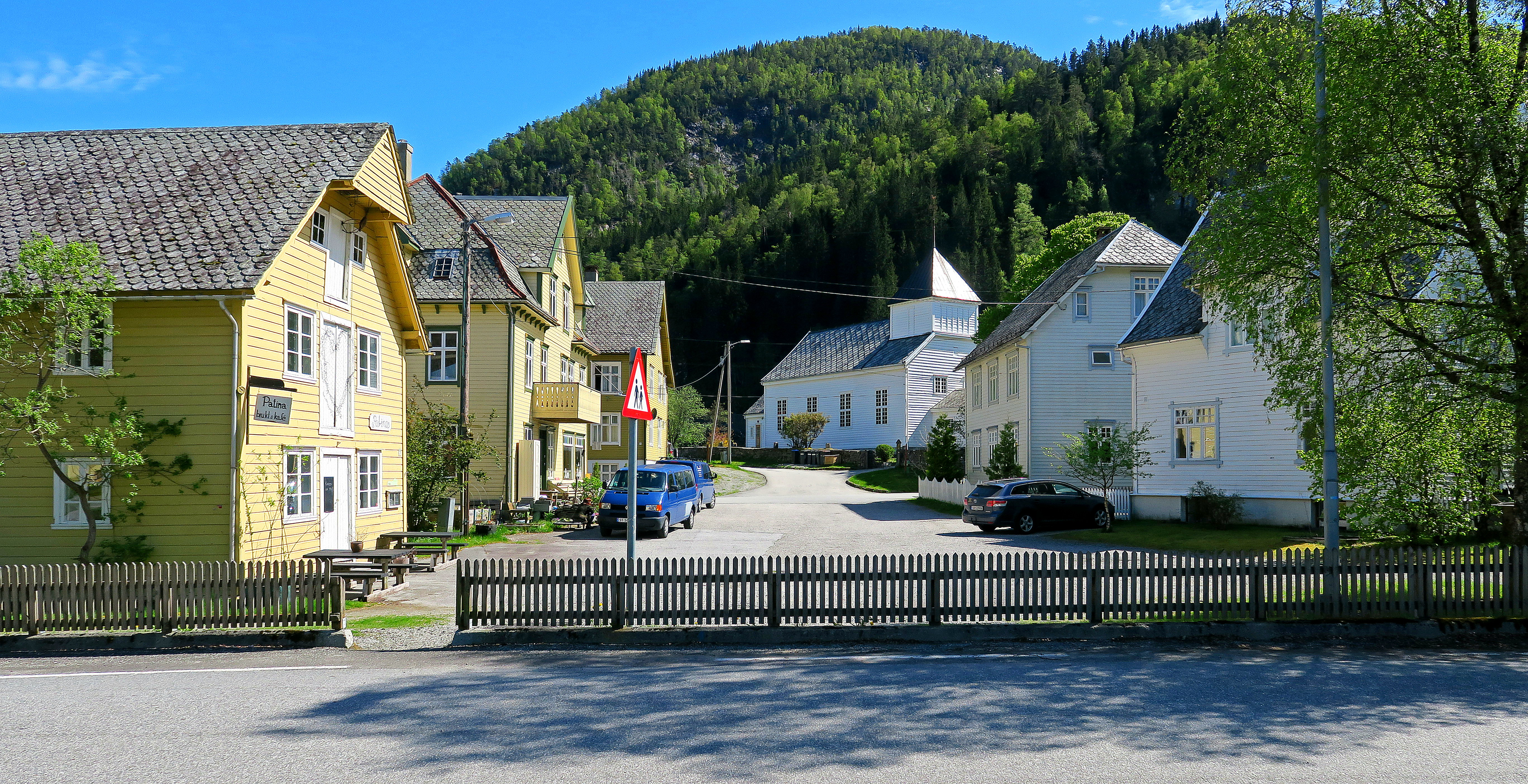
- View of Evanger village

- Hordaland within Norway

- Evanger within Hordaland
- Coordinates: 60°39′N 06°07′E
- Country: Norway
- County: Hordaland
- District: Voss
- Established: 1 Jan 1885
  - Preceded by: Voss Municipality
- Disestablished: 1 Jan 1964
  - Succeeded by: Voss Municipality and Vaksdal Municipality
- Administrative centre: Evanger

Government
  - Mayor (1948–1963): Ivar Bjørgo (Sp)

Area (upon dissolution)
  - Total: 590.6 km^{2} (228.0 sq mi)
  - Rank: #167 in Norway
- Highest elevation: 1,432 m (4,698 ft)

Population (1963)
  - Total: 1,338
  - Rank: #560 in Norway
  - Density: 2.3/km^{2} (6.0/sq mi)
  - Change (10 years): ▼ −10%
- Demonym: Vassvøring

Official language
  - Norwegian form: Nynorsk
- Time zone: UTC+01:00 (CET)
  - Summer (DST): UTC+02:00 (CEST)
- ISO 3166 code: NO-1237

Evanger is a former municipality in the old Hordaland county, Norway. The 590.6-square-kilometre (228.0 sq mi) municipality existed from 1885 until its dissolution in 1964. The area is now divided between Voss Municipality and Vaksdal Municipalityin the traditional district of Voss in Vestland county. The administrative centre was the village of Evanger where the Evanger Church is located. Other villages in the municipality included Nesheim and Bolstadøyri.

Prior to its dissolution in 1964, the 590.6-square-kilometre (228.0 sq mi) municipality was the 167th largest by area out of the 689 municipalities in Norway. Evanger Municipality was the 560th most populous municipality in Norway with a population of about 1,338. The municipality's population density was 2.3 inhabitants per square kilometre (6.0/sq mi) and its population had decreased by 10% over the previous 10-year period.

== General information ==
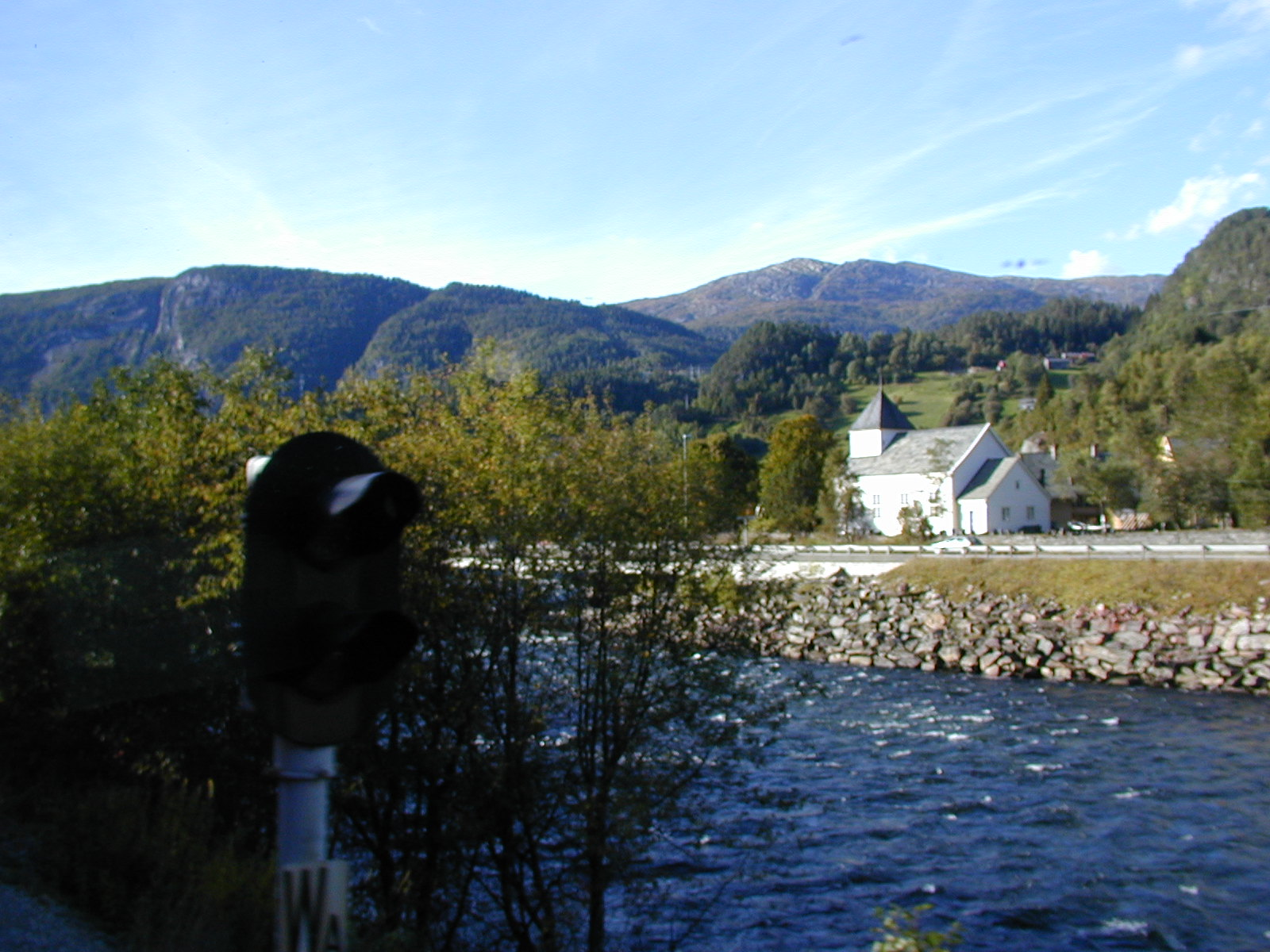
View of the village of Evanger and Evanger Church seen across the river Vosso from the Bergen Railway Line

The municipality of Evanger was established on 1 January 1885 when the large Voss Municipality was divided as follows: the western district of Voss (population: 2,045) became the new Evanger Municipality and the rest of Voss Municipality (population: 5,403) remained as Voss Municipality.

During the 1960s, there were many municipal mergers across Norway due to the work of the Schei Committee. On 1 January 1964, Evanger Municipality was dissolved. The Bergsdalen and Eksingedalen valleys (population: 251) were merged with parts of Bruvik Municipality and Modalen Municipality to create the new Vaksdal Municipality. The rest of Evanger Municipality (population: 1,075) was merged into the neighboring Voss Municipality.

=== Name ===
The municipality (originally the parish) is named after the old Evanger farm (Old Norse: Ævangir) since the first Evanger Church was built there. The first element comes from the word æja which means "to rest and eat" or "to rest and feed". The last element is the plural form of vangr which means "field" or "meadow". The name probably means something like "a place where one lets horses graze while on a journey". Historically, the name was spelled Ævanger until the early 20th century.

=== Churches ===
The Church of Norway had one parish (sokn) within Evanger Municipality. At the time of the municipal dissolution, it was part of the Evanger prestegjeld and the Hardanger og Voss prosti (deanery) in the Diocese of Bjørgvin.

Churches in Evanger Municipality
Parish (sokn)	Church name	Location of the church	Year built
Evanger	Evanger Church	Evanger	1851
Evanger	Nesheim Church	Nesheim	1908
Evanger	Bergsdalen Church	Bergsdalen	1955

Evanger Church was the main church for the municipality and it served the central part of the municipality. There were also two annex chapels: Nesheim Church served the northern areas and Bergsdalen Church served the southern areas of the municipality.

== Geography ==
The 590-square-kilometre (230 sq mi) municipality included the eastern part of the Eksingedalen valley, the area surrounding the lake Evangervatnet, and the Bergsdalen valley. The highest point in the municipality was the 1,432-metre (4,698 ft) tall mountain Kvitanosi, on the border with Voss Municipality. Vik Municipality (in Sogn og Fjordane county) was located to the north, Vossestrand Municipality was located to the northeast, Voss Municipality was located to the east, Kvam Municipality was located to the southeast, Samnanger Municipality was located to the south, Bruvik Municipality was located to the southwest, and Modalen Municipality was located to the northwest.

== Government ==
While it existed, Evanger Municipality was responsible for primary education (through 10th grade), outpatient health services, senior citizen services, welfare and other social services, zoning, economic development, and municipal roads and utilities. The municipality was governed by a municipal council of directly elected representatives. The mayor was indirectly elected by a vote of the municipal council. The municipality was under the jurisdiction of the Gulating Court of Appeal.

=== Municipal council ===
The municipal council (Heradsstyre) of Evanger Municipality was made up of 17 representatives that were elected to four year terms. The tables below show the historical composition of the council by political party.

Evanger heradsstyre 1959–1963
Party name (in Nynorsk)	Number of representatives
Labour Party (Arbeidarpartiet)	4
Conservative Party (Høgre)	1
Centre Party (Senterpartiet)	7
Liberal Party (Venstre)	5
Total number of members:	17
Note: On 1 January 1964, Evanger Municipality became part of Voss Municipality and Vaksdal Municipality.

Evanger heradsstyre 1955–1959
Party name (in Nynorsk)	Number of representatives
Labour Party (Arbeidarpartiet)	4
Conservative Party (Høgre)	1
Farmers' Party (Bondepartiet)	8
Liberal Party (Venstre)	4
Total number of members:	17

Evanger heradsstyre 1951–1955
Party name (in Nynorsk)	Number of representatives
Labour Party (Arbeidarpartiet)	4
Farmers' Party (Bondepartiet)	6
Joint List(s) of Non-Socialist Parties (Borgarlege Felleslister)	6
Total number of members:	16

Evanger heradsstyre 1947–1951
Party name (in Nynorsk)	Number of representatives
Labour Party (Arbeidarpartiet)	4
Christian Democratic Party (Kristeleg Folkeparti)	3
Farmers' Party (Bondepartiet)	6
Liberal Party (Venstre)	3
Total number of members:	16

Evanger heradsstyre 1945–1947
Party name (in Nynorsk)	Number of representatives
Labour Party (Arbeidarpartiet)	4
Farmers' Party (Bondepartiet)	6
Liberal Party (Venstre)	6
Total number of members:	16

Evanger heradsstyre 1937–1941*
Party name (in Nynorsk)	Number of representatives
Labour Party (Arbeidarpartiet)	4
Local List(s) (Lokale lister)	12
Total number of members:	16
Note: Due to the German occupation of Norway during World War II, no elections were held for new municipal councils until after the war ended in 1945.

=== Mayors ===
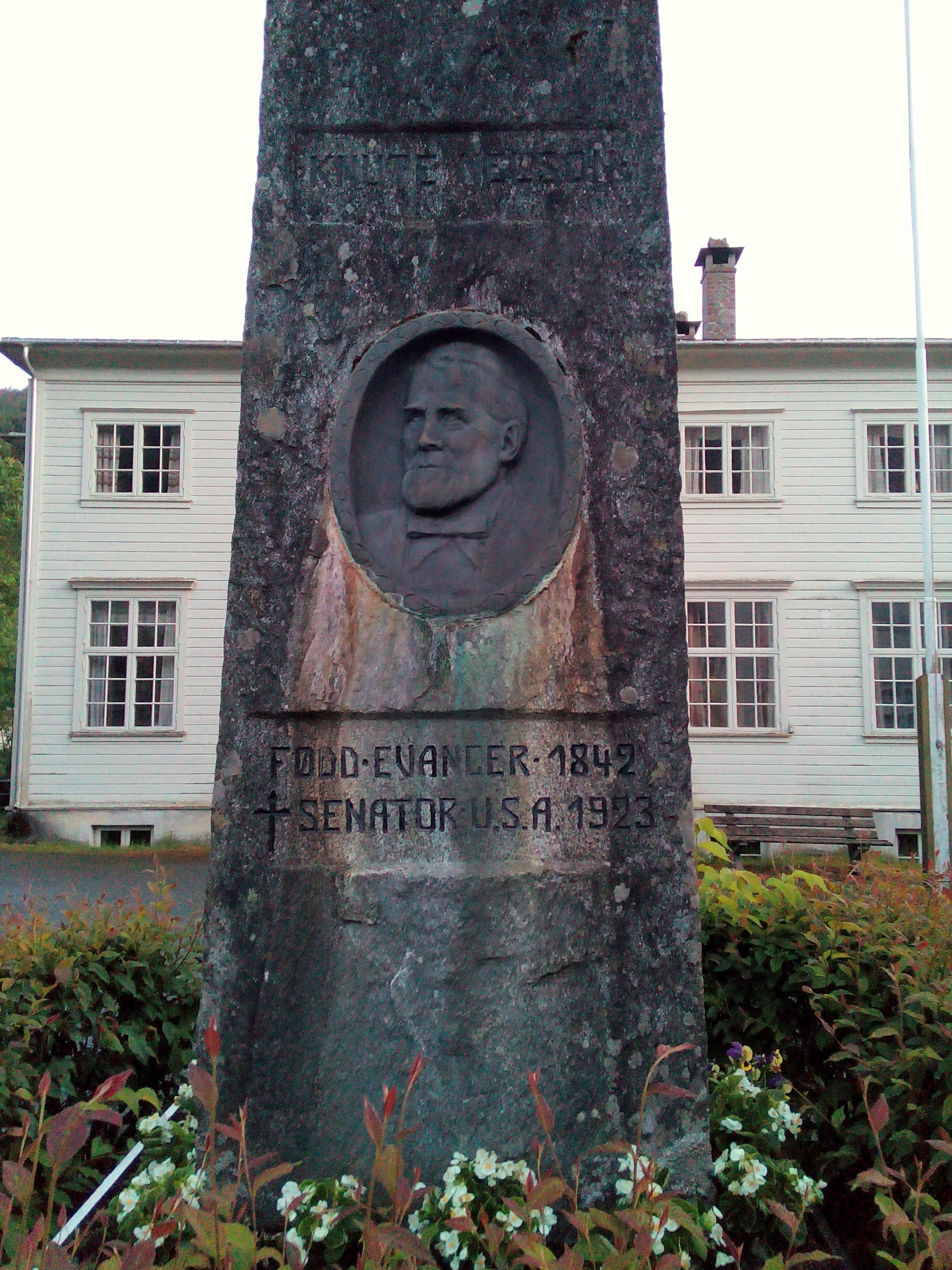
Knute Nelson memorial sign in Evanger

The mayor (Nynorsk: ordførar) of Evanger Municipality was the political leader of the municipality and the chairperson of the municipal council. The following people held this position:

- 1885–1887: Gulleik Horvei
- 1888–1897: Anders Kvilekvaal
- 1898–1898: Johannes Horvei (V)
- 1899–1913: Nils B. Mugaas (V)
- 1914–1916: Johannes Horvei (V)
- 1917–1928: Nils B. Mugaas (V)
- 1929–1937: Olav B. Rongen (V)
- 1938–1941: Gustav A. Hantveit (V)
- 1942–1945: Lars B. Horvei (NS)
- 1945–1946: Gustav A. Hantveit (V)
- 1946–1947: Magne Hjørnevik (Bp)
- 1948–1963: Ivar Bjørgo (Bp)

== Notable people ==
- Knute Nelson (1843–1923), a United States Senator
- Bjørn Rongen (1906–1983), a novelist and children's book writer
- Viking Mestad, a politician for the Norwegian Liberal Party

== See also ==
- List of former municipalities of Norway
