= Bruvik Municipality =

Former municipality in Hordaland, Norway

Bruvik Municipality Bruvik herad
- Former municipality
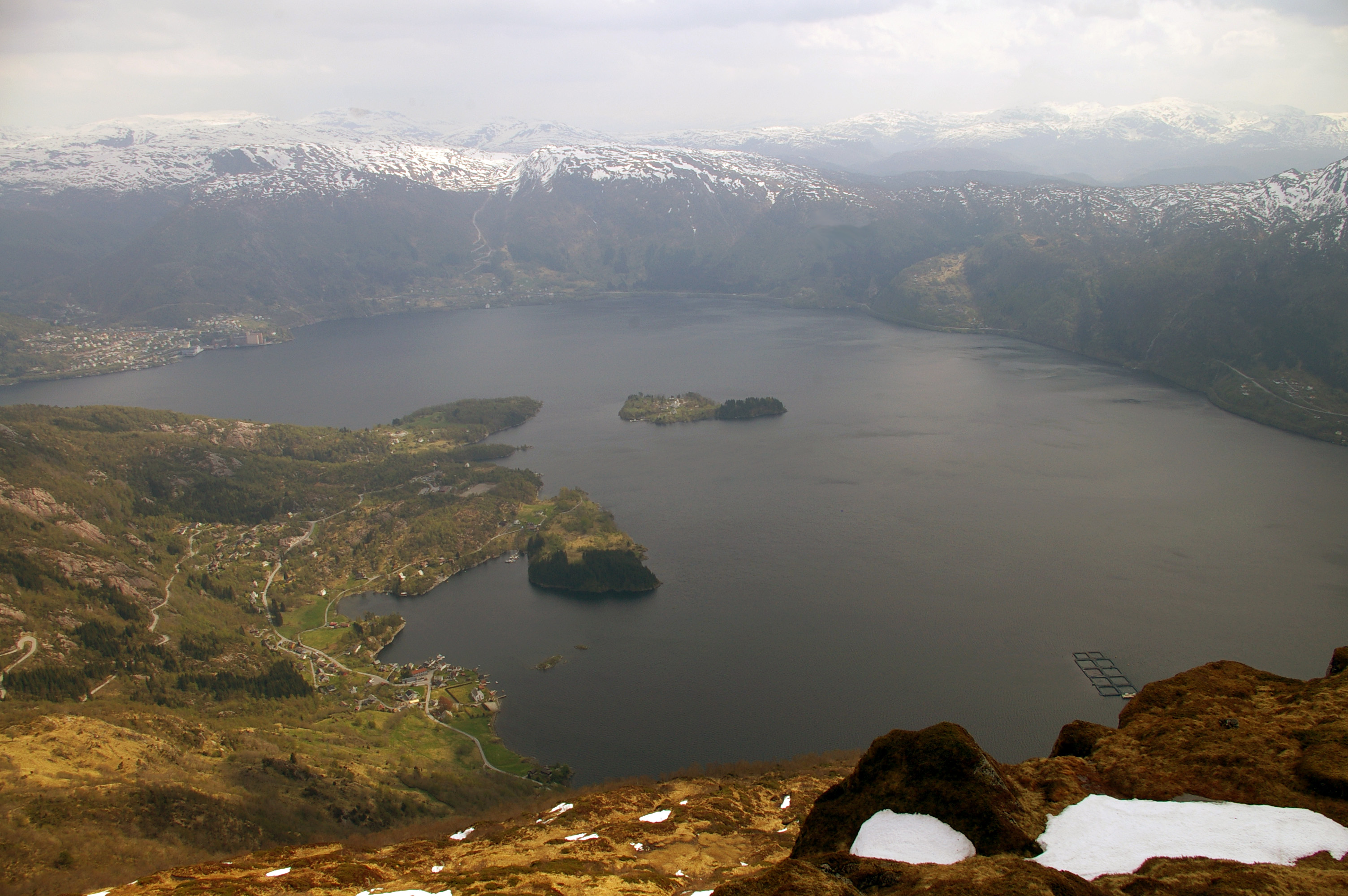
- Bruvik on Osterøy island, seen from the top of Brøknipa

- Coat of arms

- Hordaland within Norway

- Bruvik within Hordaland
- Coordinates: 60°28′50″N 05°41′00″E
- Country: Norway
- County: Hordaland
- District: Nordhordland
- Established: 1 Jan 1870
  - Preceded by: Haus Municipality
- Disestablished: 1 Jan 1964
  - Succeeded by: Vaksdal Municipality and Osterøy Municipality
- Administrative centre: Bruvik

Government
  - Mayor (1960–1963): Jan Hermann Hermansen

Area (upon dissolution)
  - Total: 363.3 km^{2} (140.3 sq mi)
  - Rank: #247 in Norway
- Highest elevation: 1,115 m (3,658 ft)

Population (1963)
  - Total: 5,709
  - Rank: #152 in Norway
  - Density: 15.7/km^{2} (41/sq mi)
  - Change (10 years): ▼ −1%
- Demonym: Bruviking

Official language
  - Norwegian form: Nynorsk
- Time zone: UTC+01:00 (CET)
  - Summer (DST): UTC+02:00 (CEST)
- ISO 3166 code: NO-1251

Bruvik is a former municipality in the old Hordaland county, Norway. The 363-square-kilometre (140 sq mi) municipality existed from 1870 until its dissolution in 1964. The area is now divided between Osterøy Municipality and Vaksdal Municipality in the traditional district of Nordhordland in Vestland county. The administrative centre was the village of Bruvik, where Bruvik Church is located. Other villages in the municipality included Dale, Dalegarden, Vaksdal, Stanghelle, and Stamneshella.

Prior to its dissolution in 1964, the 363.3-square-kilometre (140.3 sq mi) municipality was the 247th largest by area out of the 689 municipalities in Norway. Bruvik Municipality was the 152nd most populous municipality in Norway with a population of about 5,709. The municipality's population density was 15.7 inhabitants per square kilometre (41/sq mi) and its population had decreased by 1% over the previous 10-year period.

== General information ==
The parish of Haus was established as a municipality on 1 January 1838 (see formannskapsdistrikt law). On 1 January 1870, Haus Municipality was divided: the northeastern district (population: 2,062) became the new Bruvik Municipality and the rest of the municipality (population: 4,229) remained as a smaller Haus Municipality.

During the 1960s, there were many municipal mergers across Norway due to the work of the Schei Committee. On 1 January 1964, Bruvik Municipality was dissolved and its lands were divided as follows:

- the area around the village of Bruvik on the island of Osterøy (population: 409) was merged with parts of Haus Municipality (population: 2,237), Hamre Municipality (population: 1,166), and Hosanger Municipality (population: 1,616) to create the new Osterøy Municipality.
- the rest of Bruvik Municipality (population: 5,264) was merged with a parts of Evanger Municipality (population: 251) and Modalen Municipality (population: 151) to create the new Vaksdal Municipality.

=== Name ===
The municipality (originally the parish) is named after the old Bruvik farm (Old Norse: Brúnvíkr) since the first Bruvik Church was built there. The first element is brún which means "mountain ridge" or "rim". The last element is the genitive case of the word vík which means "bay", "cove" or "inlet". Thus it means the bay by the mountain ridge.

=== Coat of arms ===
The coat of arms was granted on 14 December 1960. The blazon was "Azure, a chevron over a cogwheel argent". This means the arms have a blue field (background) and the charge is a cogwheel with a chevron ordinary above it. The charge has a tincture of argent which means it is commonly colored white, but if it is made out of metal, then silver is used. The design was chosen to symbolize the importance of industry in the municipality. In 1964 when Bruvik Municipality was dissolved, the new Vaksdal Municipality (which included the majority of the old Bruvik Municipality) chose to continue using the old arms of Bruvik Municipality. Vaksdal Municipality used the arms until 1990 when new arms were adopted.

=== Churches ===
The Church of Norway had three parishes (sokn) within Bruvik Municipality. At the time of the municipal dissolution, it was part of the Bruvik prestegjeld and the Osterøy prosti (deanery) in the Diocese of Bjørgvin.

Churches in Bruvik Municipality
Parish (sokn)	Church name	Location of the church	Year built
Bruvik	Bruvik Church	Bruvik	1867
Bruvik	Vaksdal Chapel	Vaksdal	1933
Dale	Dale Church	Dale	1956
Stamnes	Stamnes Church	Stamneshella	1861

== Geography ==
At the time of its dissolution, the municipality covered 391 square kilometres (151 sq mi) on both sides of the Veafjorden, the innermost part of the Sørfjorden, including the southeastern part of the island of Osterøy. The highest point in the municipality was the 1,115-metre (3,658 ft) tall mountain Storvarden. Modalen Municipality was located to the north, Evanger Municipality was located to the east, Samnanger Municipality was located to the south, Haus Municipality was located to the southwest, and Hosanger Municipality was located to the west.

== Government ==
While it existed, Bruvik Municipality was responsible for primary education (through 10th grade), outpatient health services, senior citizen services, welfare and other social services, zoning, economic development, and municipal roads and utilities. The municipality was governed by a municipal council of directly elected representatives. The mayor was indirectly elected by a vote of the municipal council. The municipality was under the jurisdiction of the Gulating Court of Appeal.

=== Municipal council ===
The municipal council (Heradsstyre) of Bruvik Municipality was made up of 37 representatives that were elected to four year terms. The tables below show the historical composition of the council by political party.

Bruvik heradsstyre 1959–1963
Party name (in Nynorsk)	Number of representatives
Labour Party (Arbeidarpartiet)	20
Christian Democratic Party (Kristeleg Folkeparti)	7
Liberal Party (Venstre)	6
Local List(s) (Lokale lister)	4
Total number of members:	37
Note: On 1 January 1964, Bruvik Municipality became part of Osterøy Municipality and Vaksdal Municipality.

Bruvik heradsstyre 1955–1959
Party name (in Nynorsk)	Number of representatives
Labour Party (Arbeidarpartiet)	22
Christian Democratic Party (Kristeleg Folkeparti)	4
Farmers' Party (Bondepartiet)	2
Local List(s) (Lokale lister)	9
Total number of members:	37

Bruvik heradsstyre 1951–1955
Party name (in Nynorsk)	Number of representatives
Labour Party (Arbeidarpartiet)	20
Joint List(s) of Non-Socialist Parties (Borgarlege Felleslister)	13
Local List(s) (Lokale lister)	3
Total number of members:	36

Bruvik heradsstyre 1947–1951
Party name (in Nynorsk)	Number of representatives
Labour Party (Arbeidarpartiet)	17
Communist Party (Kommunistiske Parti)	3
Local List(s) (Lokale lister)	16
Total number of members:	36

Bruvik heradsstyre 1945–1947
Party name (in Nynorsk)	Number of representatives
Labour Party (Arbeidarpartiet)	16
Communist Party (Kommunistiske Parti)	4
List of workers, fishermen, and small farmholders (Arbeidarar, fiskarar, småbrukarar liste)	3
Local List(s) (Lokale lister)	13
Total number of members:	36

Bruvik heradsstyre 1937–1941*
Party name (in Nynorsk)	Number of representatives
Labour Party (Arbeidarpartiet)	11
Liberal Party (Venstre)	5
Joint List(s) of Non-Socialist Parties (Borgarlege Felleslister)	11
Local List(s) (Lokale lister)	9
Total number of members:	36
Note: Due to the German occupation of Norway during World War II, no elections were held for new municipal councils until after the war ended in 1945.

=== Mayors ===
The mayor (Nynorsk: ordførar) of Bruvik Municipality was the political leader of the municipality and the chairperson of the municipal council. The following people held this position:

- 1870–1877: Anders Johannesson Sandvik
- 1878–1879: Nils Monsson Helle
- 1880–1885: Nils Haldorsen Faugstad
- 1886–1891: Anders Olson Herfindal
- 1892–1893: Anders A. Boge
- 1894–1907: Nils Larsen Eknes
- 1908–1911: Martinius Rimmereid
- 1911–1913: Hans Mathiasson Brørvik
- 1914–1916: Martinius Rimmereid
- 1917–1919: Hans Mathiasson Brørvik
- 1920–1928: John Haldorson Dale
- 1929–1937: Olaf Rimmereid
- 1938–1940: Arnfinn Nygaard
- 1941–1945: Andreas Johannesson Dahle
- 1945–1945: Arnfinn Nygård
- 1946–1957: Knut Severin Jakobsen Vik
- 1958–1959: Steinar Salhus
- 1959–1959: Bernhard Johannesson Trettenes
- 1960–1963: Jan Hermann Hermansen

== See also ==
- List of former municipalities of Norway
