= Øvre Helland =

Village in Modalen Municipality, Norway

Øvre Helland Øvrehelland (unofficial)
- Village
- Interactive map of Øvre Helland
- Coordinates: 60.85225°N 5.97376°E
- Country: Norway
- Region: Western Norway
- County: Vestland
- District: Nordhordland
- Municipality: Modalen Municipality
- Elevation: 121 m (397 ft)
- Time zone: UTC+01:00 (CET)
  - Summer (DST): UTC+02:00 (CEST)
- Post Code: 5729 Modalen

Øvre Helland is a village in Modalen Municipality in Vestland county, Norway. The village is located along the river Moelva, about 15 kilometres (9.3 mi) to the northeast of the village of Mo i Modalen. The lake Steinslandsvatnet lies just north of the village and the lake Skjerjavatnet lies about 5 kilometres (3.1 mi) east of the village.
