= Skjerjavatnet =

Lake in Vestland, Norway

- Interactive map of Skjerjavatnet
- Location: Modalen and Vaksdal, Vestland
- Coordinates: 60.885°N 6.1172°E
- Basin countries: Norway
- Max. length: 7.6 kilometres (4.7 mi)
- Max. width: 1.5 kilometres (0.93 mi)
- Surface area: 7.37 km^{2} (2.85 sq mi)
- Shore length^{1}: 34.67 kilometres (21.54 mi)
- Surface elevation: 964 metres (3,163 ft)
- References: NVE
- ^{1} Shore length is not a well-defined measure.

Skjerjavatnet is a lake and reservoir in the Nordhordland area of Vestland county, Norway. It is located on the border of Vaksdal Municipality and Modalen Municipality. The 7.37-square-kilometre (2.85 sq mi) lake sits at an elevation of 964 metres (3,163 ft) above sea level, in the mountains between the Modalen valley and Eksingedalen valley. The southwest and northeast ends of the lake are both dammed up so that the lake can be regulated for hydroelectric power.

== See also ==
- List of lakes in Norway
