= Dale, Vaksdal =

Village in Vaksdal Municipality, Norway

Dale Dalekvam (unofficial)
- Village
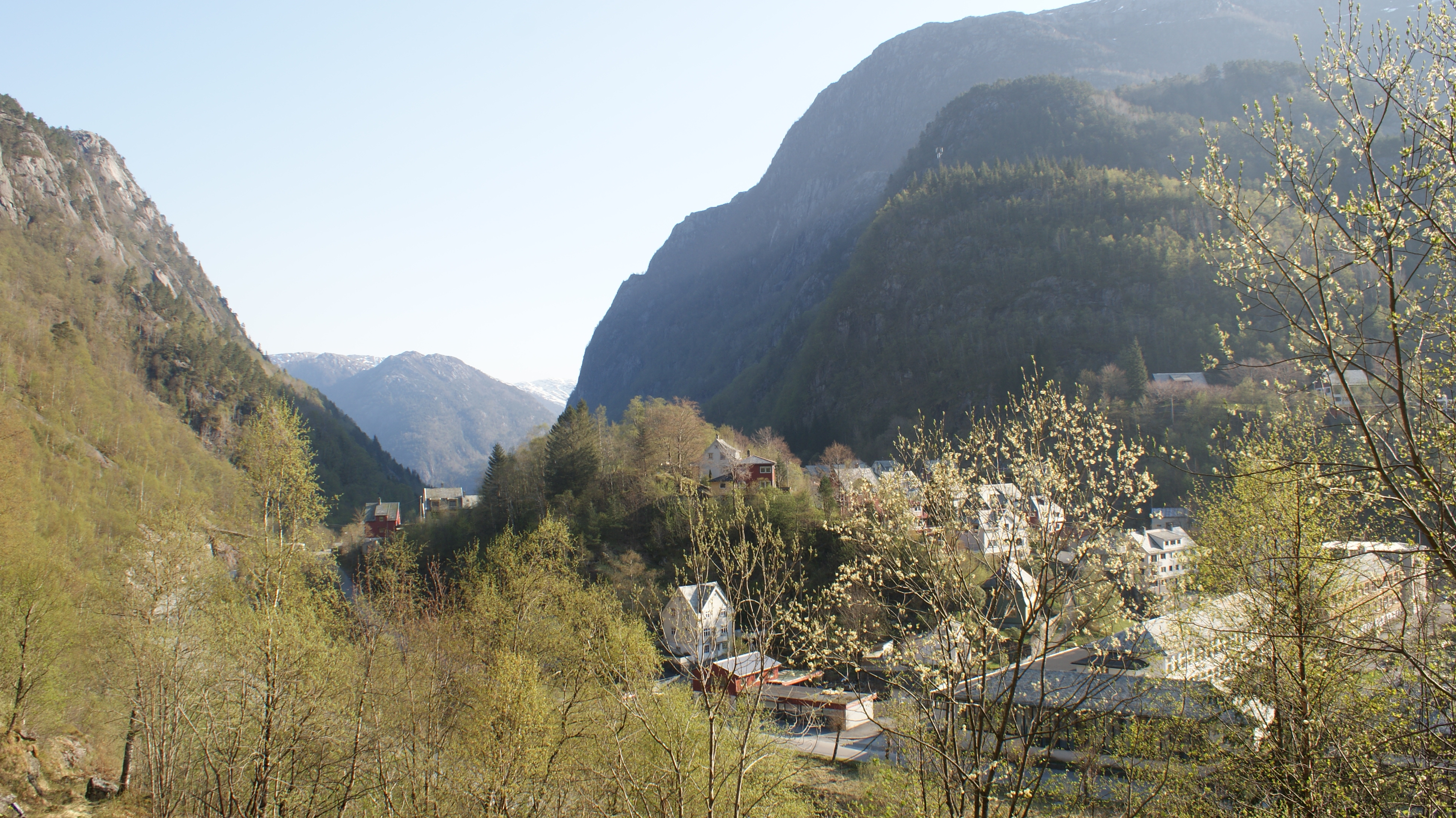
- View of the village
- Interactive map of Dale
- Coordinates: 60.58639°N 5.81888°E
- Country: Norway
- Region: Western Norway
- County: Vestland
- District: Nordhordland
- Municipality: Vaksdal Municipality

Area
  - Total: 0.71 km^{2} (0.27 sq mi)
- Elevation: 35 m (115 ft)

Population (2025)
  - Total: 1,159
  - Density: 1,632/km^{2} (4,230/sq mi)
- Time zone: UTC+01:00 (CET)
  - Summer (DST): UTC+02:00 (CEST)
- Post Code: 5722 Dalekvam

Dale (Norwegian pronunciation: [ˈdɑːɫə]) or Dalekvam is the administrative centre of Vaksdal Municipality in Vestland county, Norway. The village lies at the western end of the Bergsdalen valley, about 5 kilometres (3.1 mi) northeast of the village of Stanghelle on the shore of the Veafjorden. The village lies along the European route E16, the Bergen Line (and Dale Station), and the river Daleelva.

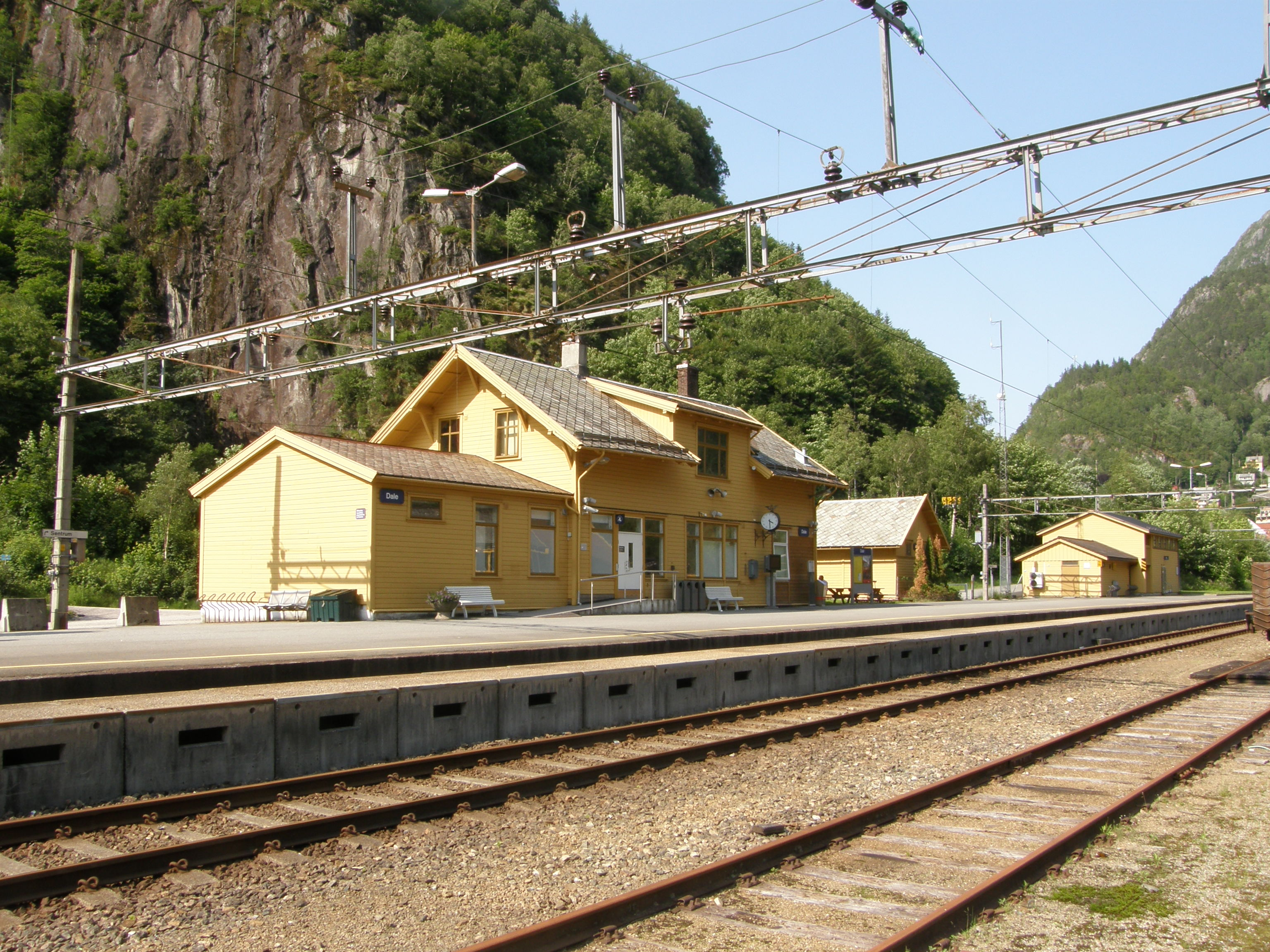
View of the local train station

The 0.71-square-kilometre (180-acre) village has a population (2025) of 1,159 and a population density of 1,632 inhabitants per square kilometre (4,230/sq mi). The small village of Dalegarden at the southern end of Dale is included in the "urban area" of Dale.

Dale Church is located in the village. The village is also the site of the international Dale of Norway company which manufactures wool sweaters and outdoor jackets. There is also a textile mill and other small industries.

The newspaper VaksdalPosten has been published in Dale since 1987.
