= Dalegarden =

Village in Vaksdal Municipality, Norway

- Village
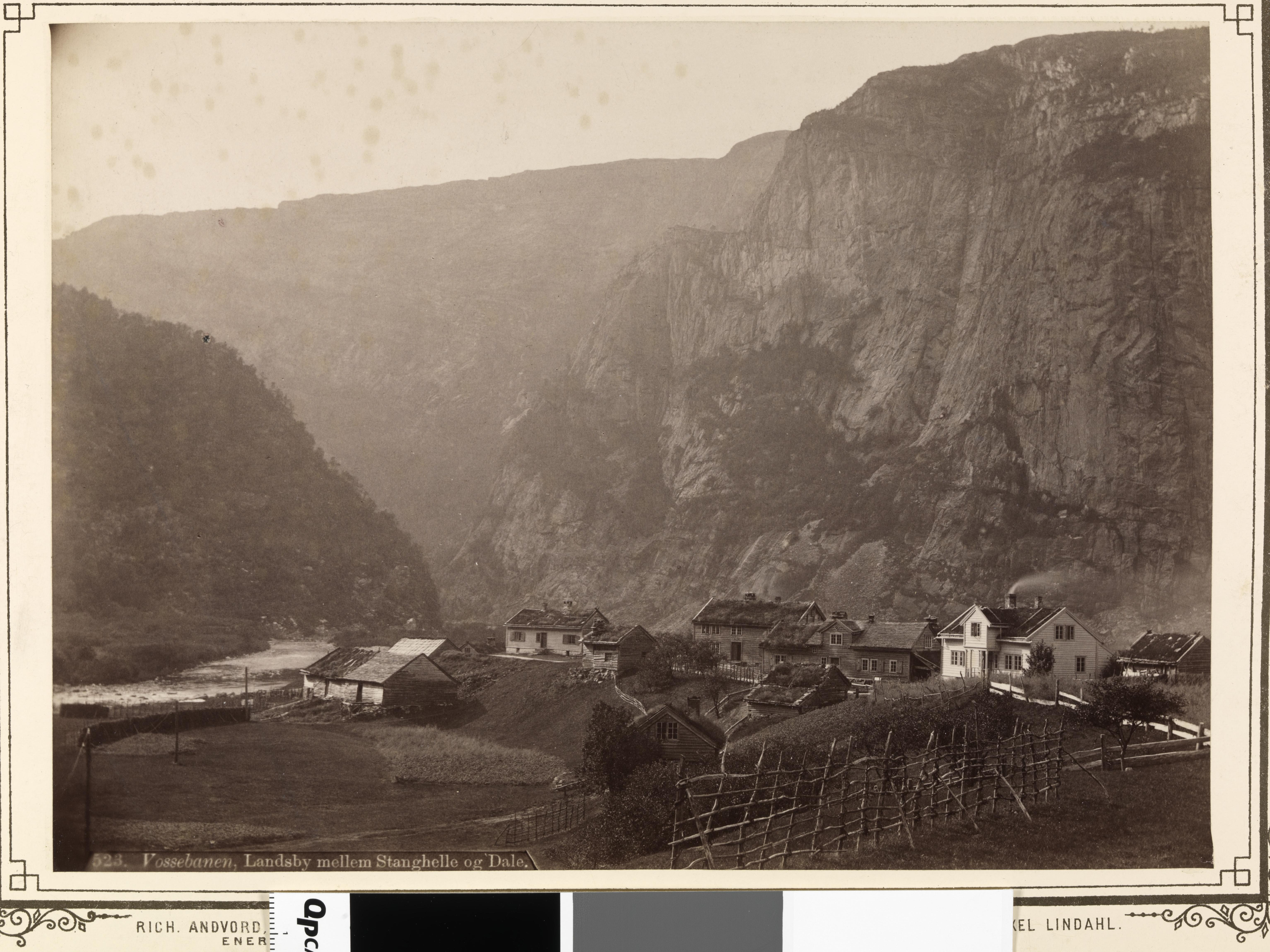
- View of the village c. 1885
- Interactive map of Dalegarden
- Coordinates: 60.58119°N 5.79376°E
- Country: Norway
- Region: Western Norway
- County: Vestland
- District: Nordhordland
- Municipality: Vaksdal Municipality
- Elevation: 12 m (39 ft)
- Time zone: UTC+01:00 (CET)
  - Summer (DST): UTC+02:00 (CEST)
- Post Code: 5722 Dalekvam

Dalegarden is a small village in Vaksdal Municipality in Vestland county, Norway. It is located immediately southwest of the municipal centre, Dale. The village of Dalegarden is considered to be part of the urban area of Dale which had an overall population of 1,159 (in 2025).
