= Dale Church (Vaksdal) =

Church in Vestland, Norway

- Dale kyrkje
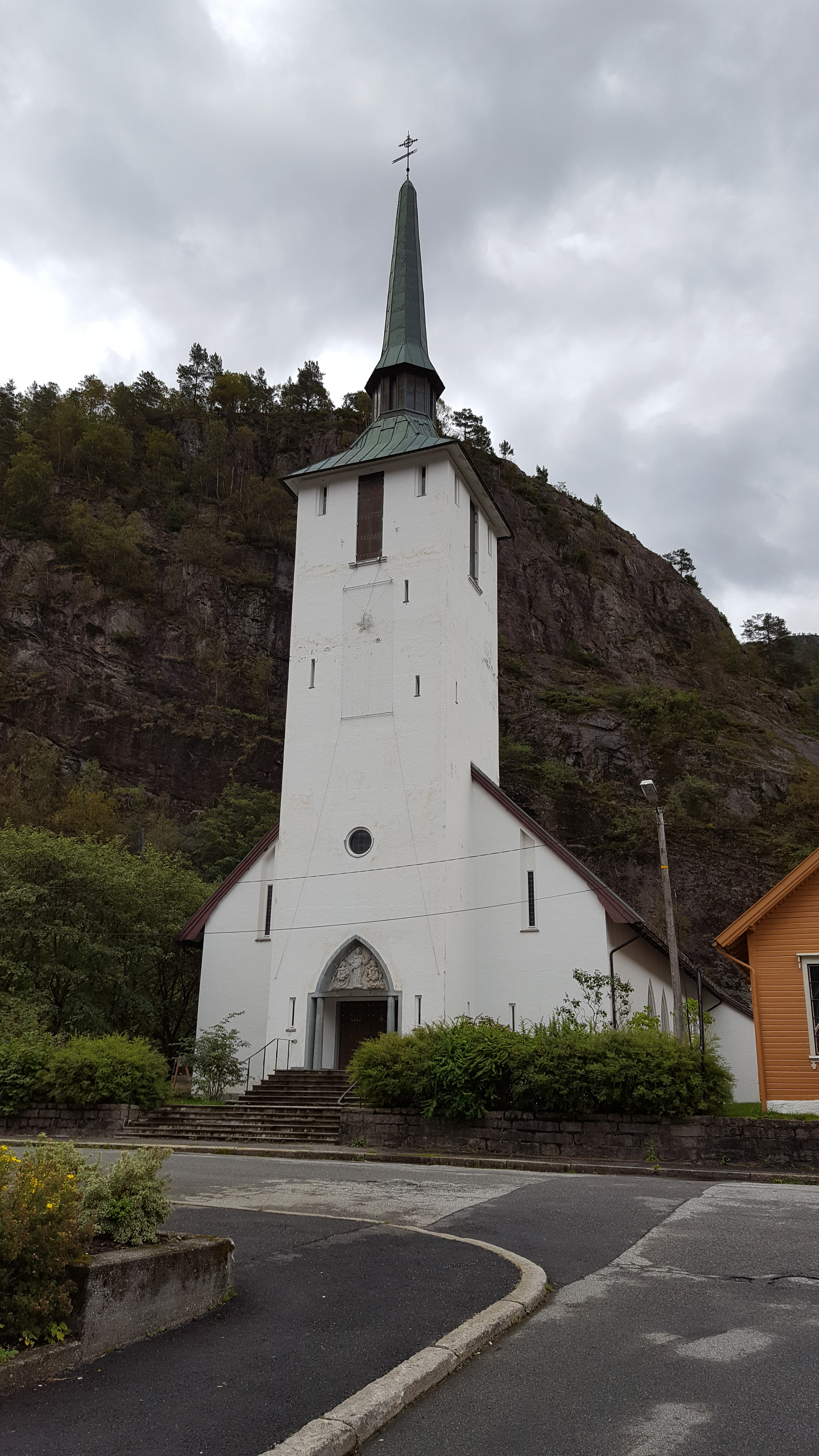
- View of the church
- Dale Church
- 60°35′25″N 5°49′26″E
- Location: Vaksdal, Vestland
- Country: Norway
- Denomination: Church of Norway
- Churchmanship: Evangelical Lutheran

History
- Status: Parish church
- Founded: 1896
- Consecrated: 16 December 1956

Architecture
- Functional status: Active
- Architect: Arnstein Arneberg
- Architectural type: Long church
- Completed: 1956 (70 years ago)

Specifications
- Capacity: 600
- Materials: Concrete

Administration
- Diocese: Bjørgvin bispedømme
- Deanery: Hardanger og Voss prosti
- Parish: Dale
- Norwegian Cultural Heritage Site
- Type: Church
- Status: Not protected
- ID: 84016

Dale Church (Norwegian: Dale kyrkje) is a parish church of the Church of Norway in Vaksdal Municipality in Vestland county, Norway. It is located in the village of Dale. It is the church for the Dale parish which is part of the Hardanger og Voss prosti (deanery) in the Diocese of Bjørgvin. The white, concrete church was built in a long church design in 1956 using plans drawn up by the architect Arnstein Arneberg. The church seats about 600 people.

== History ==
In 1895, plans were made to build a chapel in the village of Dale. Peter and Jens Jebsen wrote a letter to the municipal council that Dale Fabrikker, a local industrial business, would pay for the upkeep of the new chapel. Johannes Haldorsen was hired to build the chapel. On 16 July 1896, King Oscar II visited Dale and saw the chapel as it was being built. The new chapel was consecrated on 15 November 1896 by the Bishop Waldemar Hvoslef. The chapel was built in a neo-Gothic style and had 380 seats, including the second floor seating gallery. In 1916, electric lights were installed in the building.

By the 1930s, it was noted that the chapel was too small for the village. Planning for a new, larger church began in the 1930s. Arnstein Arneberg won the architectural competition to design the new church. Work on this stopped for many years due to World War II, but in 1947, Arneberg delivered his drawings for the new church. It wasn't until September 1953, that a building permit was granted. The old chapel was torn down and its materials were sold. The groundbreaking ceremony for the new church was held in 1954 and it was completed in 1956. The new church was consecrated on 16 December 1956.

== Media gallery ==
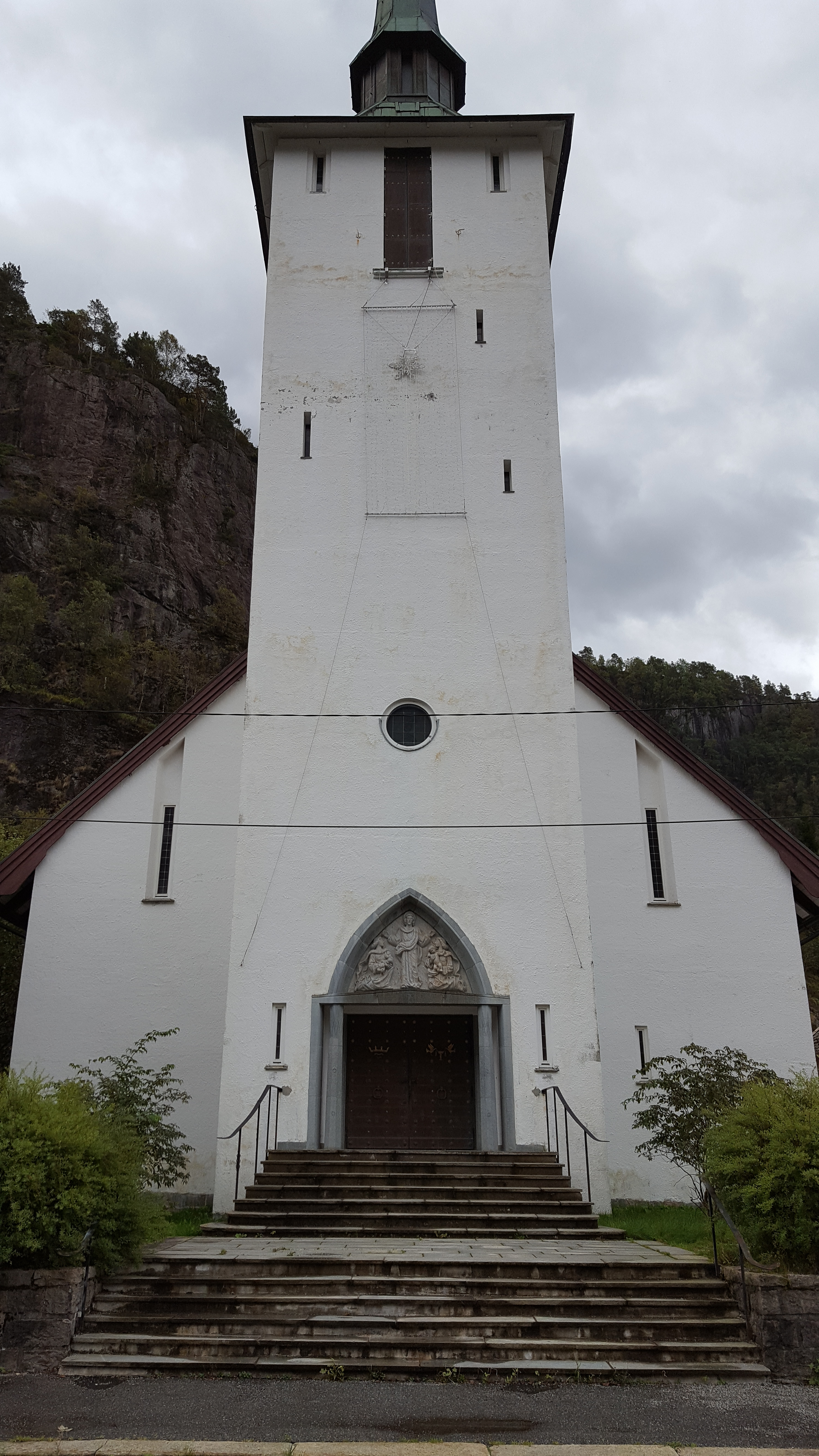

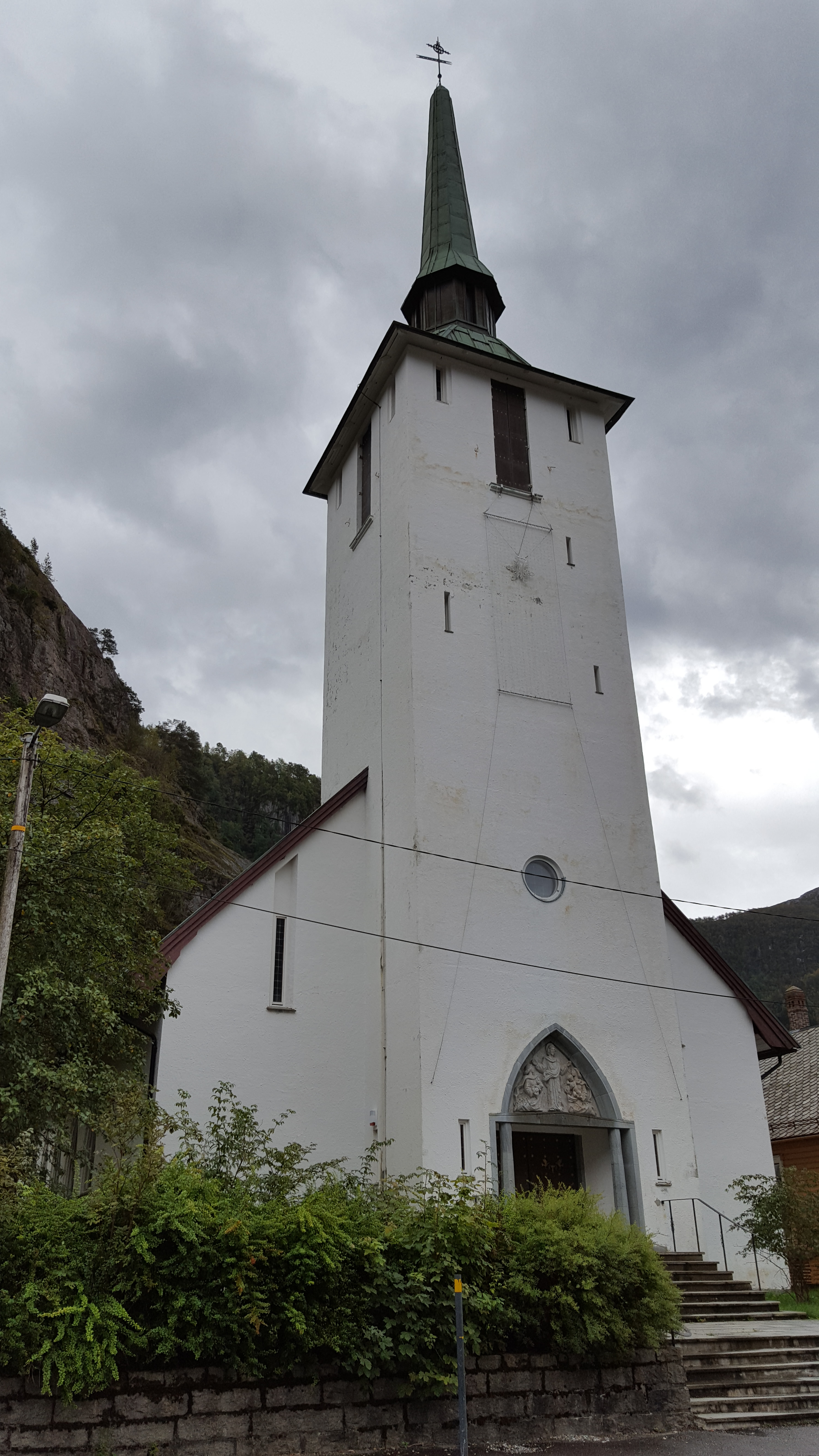

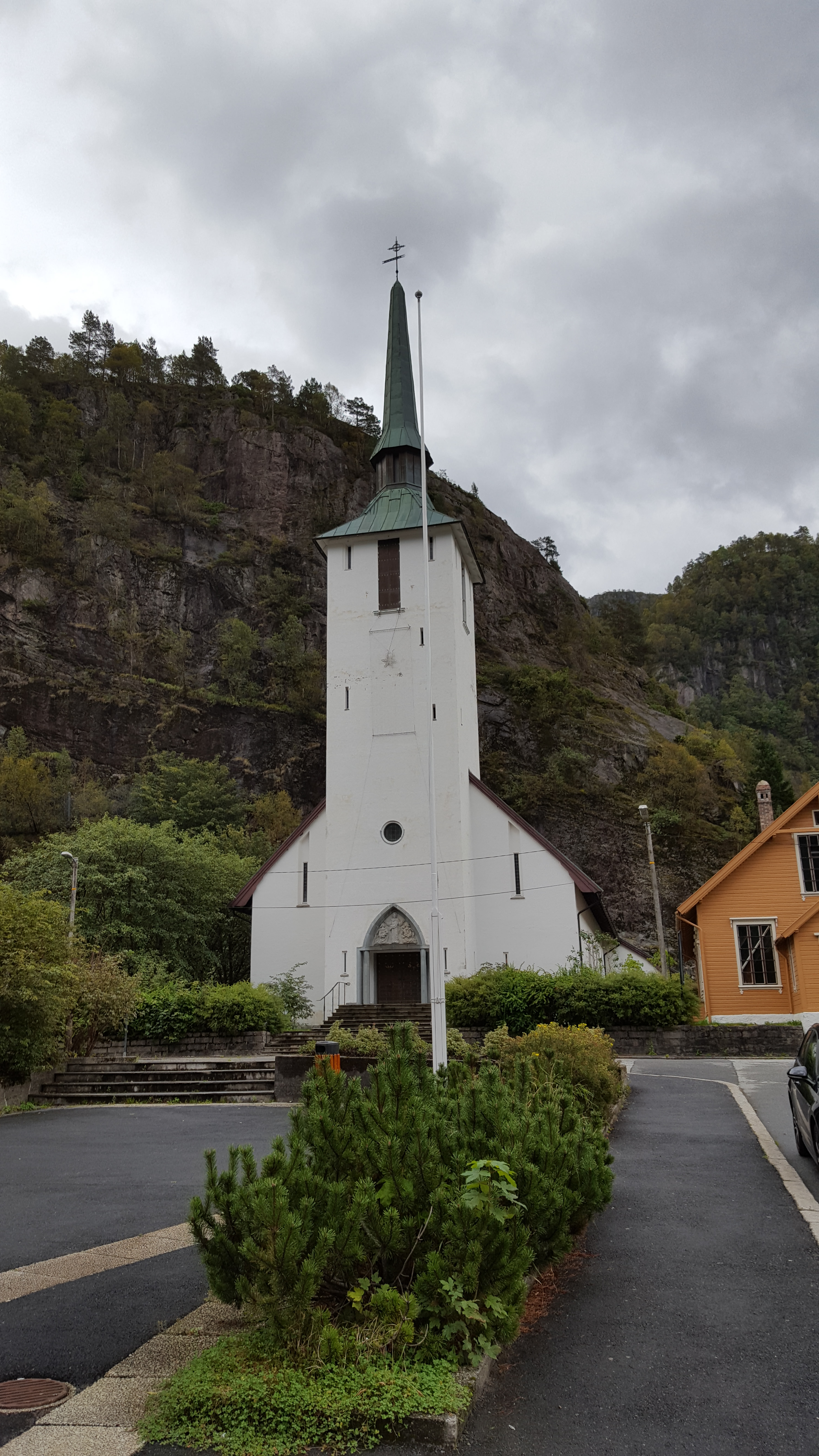

== See also ==
- List of churches in Bjørgvin
