= Vaksdal Municipality =

Municipality in Vestland, Norway

Vaksdal Municipality Vaksdal kommune
- Municipality
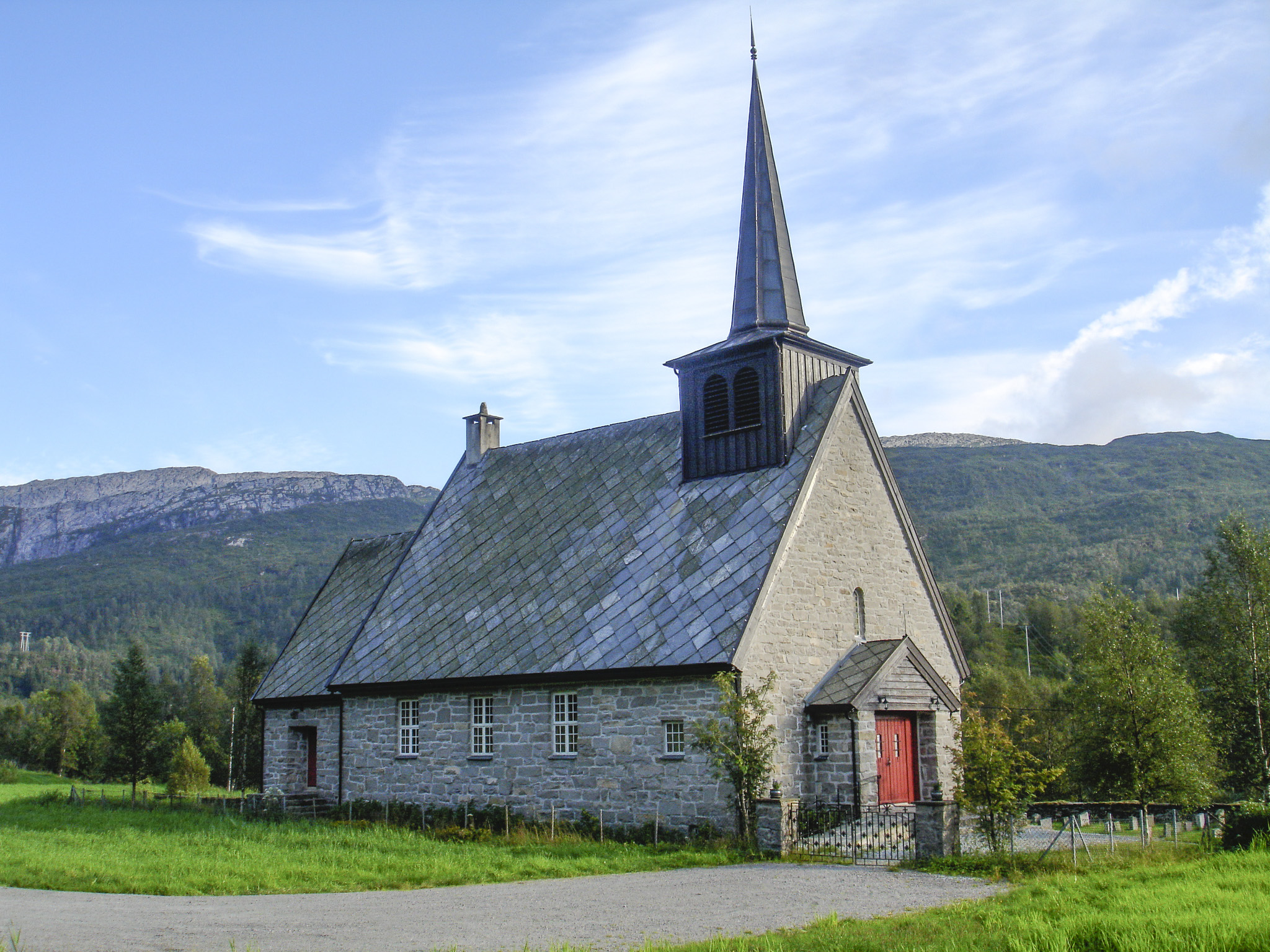
- View of the Bergsdalen Church in Vaksdal

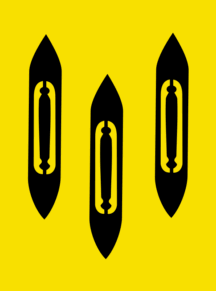
- Flag Coat of arms

- Vestland within Norway

- Vaksdal within Vestland
- Coordinates: 60°36′25″N 05°48′58″E
- Country: Norway
- County: Vestland
- District: Nordhordland
- Established: 1 Jan 1964
  - Preceded by: Bruvik and parts of Modalen and Evanger
- Administrative centre: Dalekvam

Government
  - Mayor (2019): Hege Eide Vik (Sp)

Area
  - Total: 715.37 km^{2} (276.21 sq mi)
  - Land: 682.27 km^{2} (263.43 sq mi)
  - Water: 33.10 km^{2} (12.78 sq mi) 4.6%
  - Rank: #160 in Norway
- Highest elevation: 1,264.43 m (4,148.4 ft)

Population (2025)
  - Total: 3,875
  - Rank: #209 in Norway
  - Density: 5.4/km^{2} (14/sq mi)
  - Change (10 years): ▼ −7%
- Demonym(s): Vaksdaling (Vaksdøling)

Official language
  - Norwegian form: Nynorsk
- Time zone: UTC+01:00 (CET)
  - Summer (DST): UTC+02:00 (CEST)
- ISO 3166 code: NO-4628
- Website: Official website

Vaksdal is a municipality in the county of Vestland, Norway. It is located in the traditional district of Nordhordland. The administrative centre is the village of Dalekvam. Other villages in the municipality include Dalegarden, Flatkvål, Helle, Nesheim, Stamneshella, Stanghelle, and Vaksdal.

The 715.37-square-kilometre (276.21 sq mi) municipality is the 160th largest by area out of the 357 municipalities in Norway. Vaksdal Municipality is the 209th most populous municipality in Norway with a population of 3,875. The municipality's population density is 5.4 inhabitants per square kilometre (14/sq mi) and its population has decreased by 7% over the previous 10-year period.

== General information ==
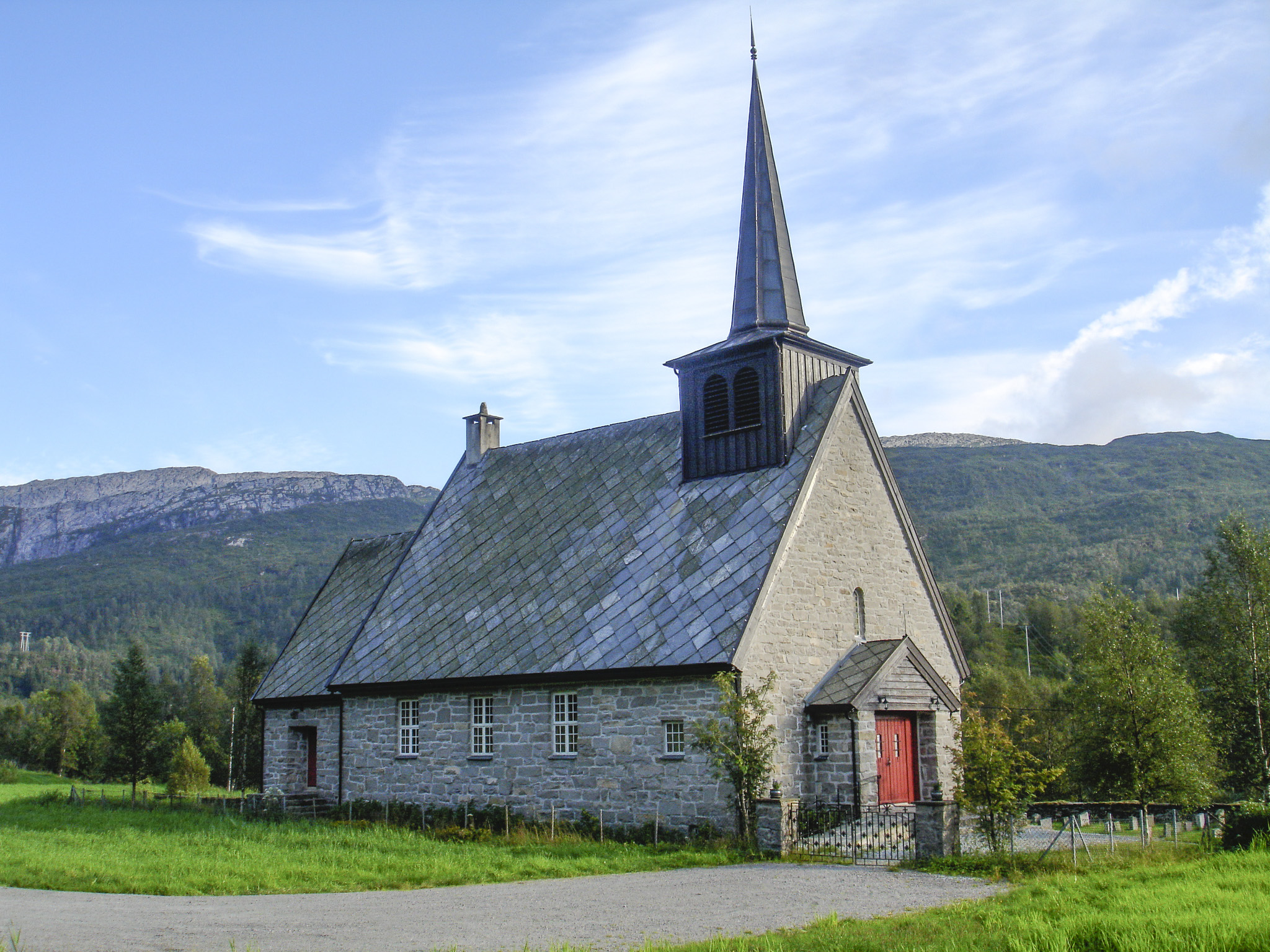
Bergsdalen Church

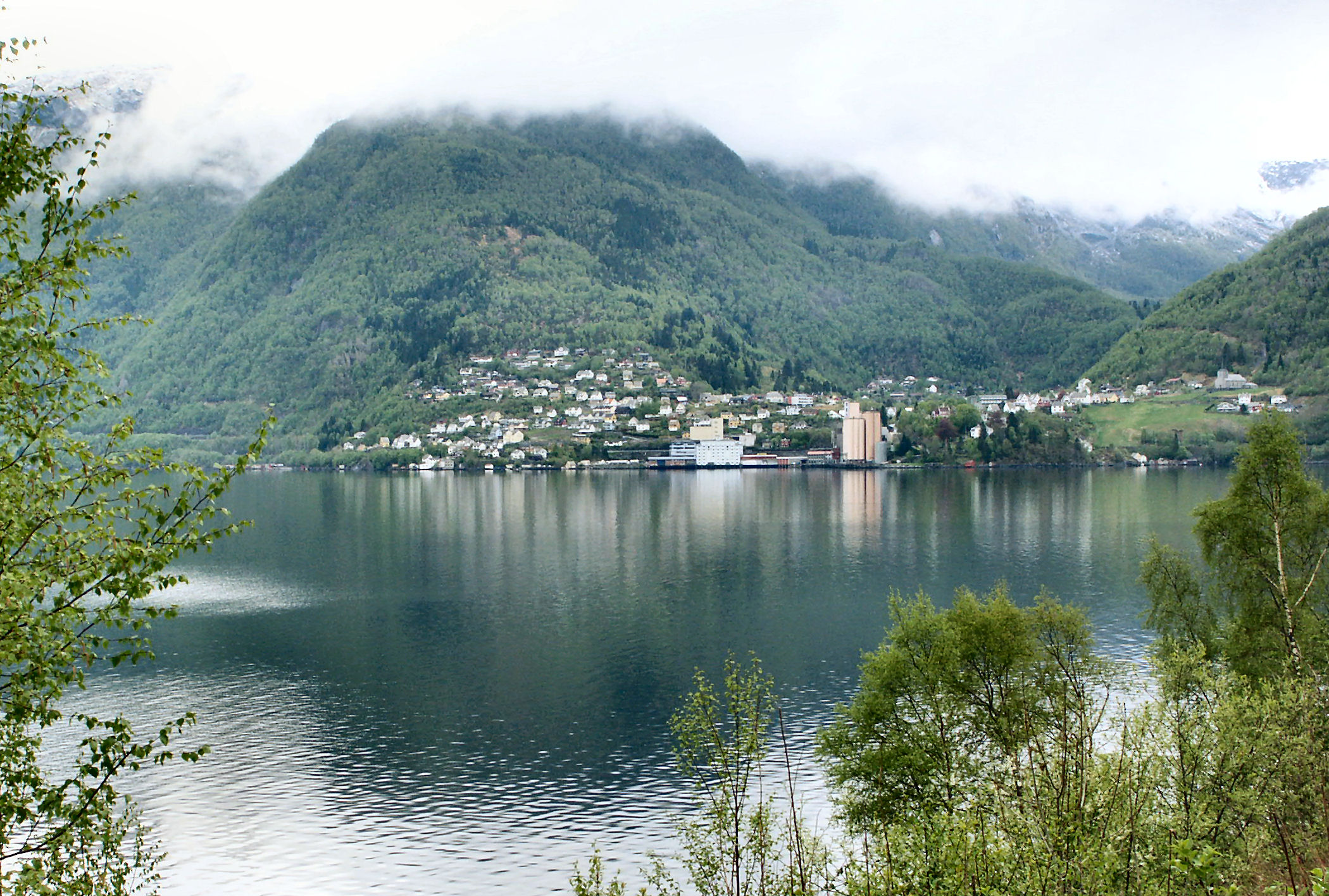
View of the village of Vaksdal

The municipality of Vaksdal was created on 1 January 1964 after a major municipal restructuring after the Schei Committee's recommendations. Vaksdal Municipality was created by merging the following places:

- all of Bruvik Municipality, except for the Bruvikbygda area on the island of Osterøy (population: 5,264)
- the Bergsdalen and Eksingedalen valleys from Evanger Municipality (population: 251)
- the rest of the Eksingedalen valley that was located in Modalen Municipality (population: 151)

Historically, this municipality was part of the old Hordaland county. On 1 January 2020, the municipality became a part of the newly-formed Vestland county (after Hordaland and Sogn og Fjordane counties were merged).

=== Name ===
The municipality (originally the parish) is named after the village of Vaksdal (Old Norse: Vágsdalr), one of the main villages in the municipality. The first element is the genitive case of the word vágr which means "bay" or "inlet". The last element is dalr which means "valley" or "dale". Alternately, the first part of the name could be derived from a local river name spelled Vaxa or Veksa which would mean the valley of the river Vaxa/Veksa.

=== Coat of arms ===
Arms from 1964-1990 (left) and current arms since 1990 (right).

On 1 January 1964, the new Vaksdal Municipality was established upon the merger of Bruvik Municipality with some neighboring areas. The old coat of arms for Bruvik Municipality was carried over to the new municipality. Bruvik's arms were granted on 14 December 1960, just a few years earlier, and they were in use until 16 November 1990 when a new design was approved. The blazon for the old arms was "Azure, a chevron over a cogwheel argent". This means the arms have a blue field (background) and the charge is a cogwheel with a chevron shape above it. The charge has a tincture of argent which means it is commonly colored white, but if it is made out of metal, then silver is used. The design was chosen to symbolize the importance of industry in the municipality. The municipal flag has the same design as the coat of arms.

A new coat of arms was granted on 16 November 1990 to replace the old arms. The official blazon is "Or, three shuttles sable palewise two and one" (Norwegian: På gul grunn tre opprette svarte skytlar). This means the arms have a field (background) has a tincture of Or which means it is commonly colored yellow, but if it is made out of metal, then gold is used. The charge is a set of three shuttles for weaving that are lined up vertically. The shuttles were chosen to represent the past and present textile industry of the municipality. The Dale of Norway company is based here and it is an international company renowned for its wool sweaters. The arms were designed by Charles Lunde, a graphic designer who based the design on an idea by the local artist E. Eriksen. The municipal flag has the same design as the coat of arms.

=== Churches ===
The Church of Norway has six parishes (sokn) within Vaksdal Municipality. It is part of the Hardanger og Voss prosti (deanery) in the Diocese of Bjørgvin.

Churches in Vaksdal Municipality
Parish (sokn)	Church name	Location of the church	Year built
Bergsdalen	Bergsdalen Church	Bergsdalen	1955
Dale	Dale Church	Dalekvam	1956
Eksingedal	Eksingedal Church	Flatkvål	1883
Nesheim	Nesheim Church	Nesheim	1908
Stamnes	Stamnes Church	Stamneshella	1861
Vaksdal	Vaksdal Church	Vaksdal	1933

== Population ==
Historical population
Year	1964	1970	1980	1990	2000	2010	2020	2023
Pop.	5,666	5,498	4,851	4,519	4,192	4,107	3,977	3,875
±% p.a.	—	−0.50%	−1.24%	−0.71%	−0.75%	−0.20%	−0.32%	−0.86%
Source: Statistics Norway

== Geography ==
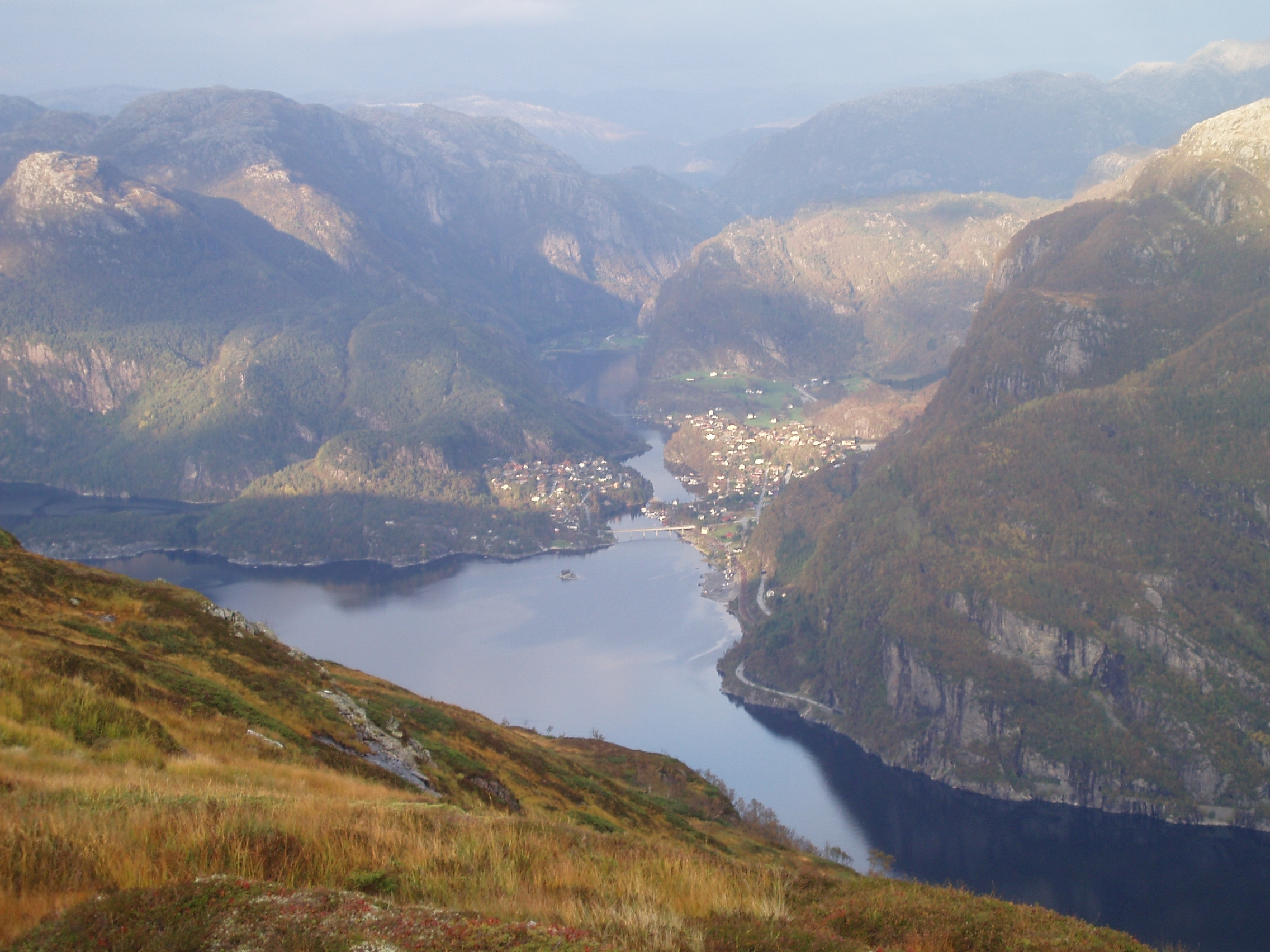
View of Stanghelle and the surrounding mountains and valleys

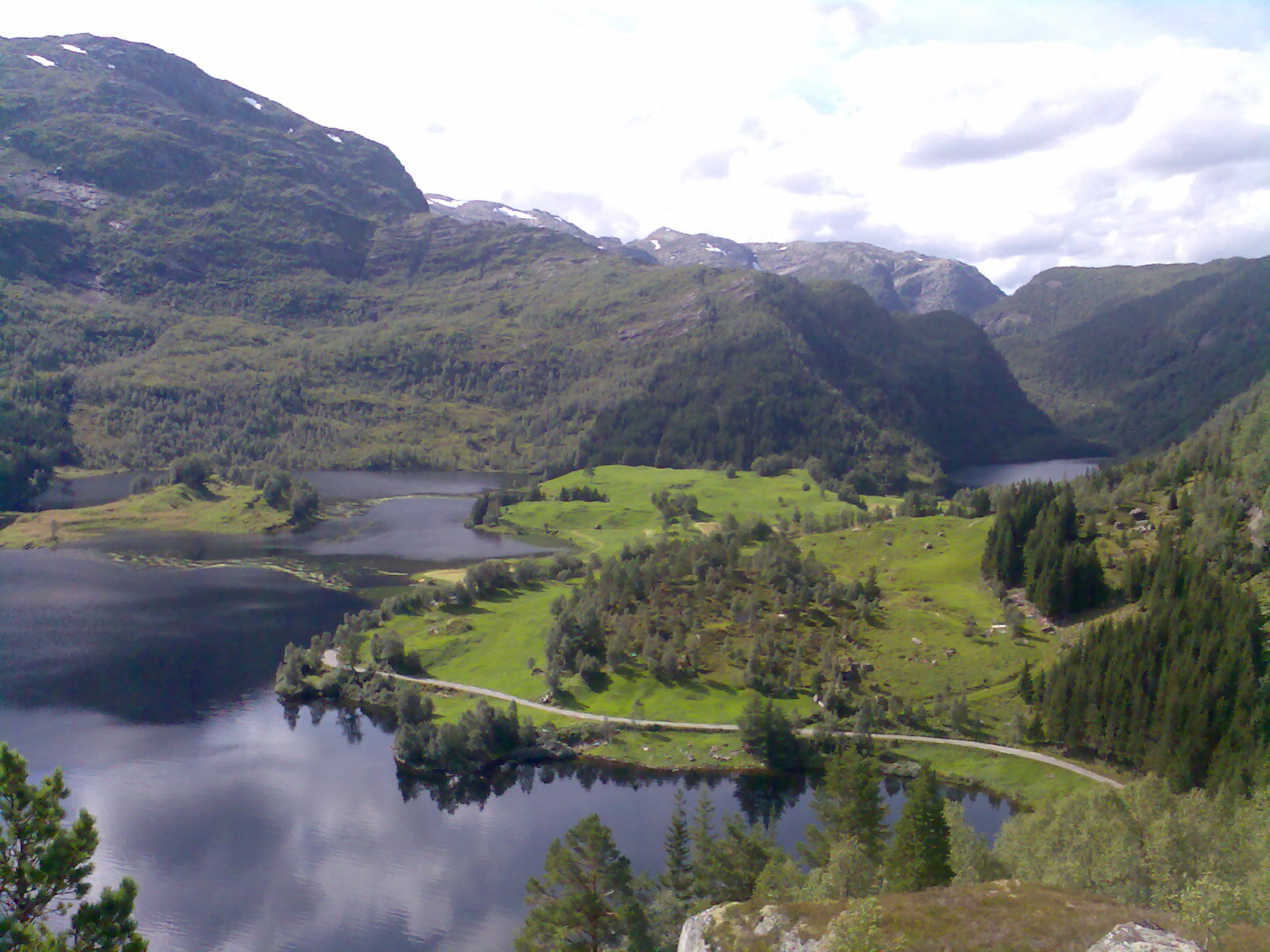
View of the Eksingedalen valley

The municipality is mountainous, and stretches along both sides of the Veafjorden with adjacent valleys. It includes part of the island Osterøy. The Kallestadsundet Bridge connects the mainland of Vaksdal to the island of Osterøy. In the north, it includes the valleys of Eksingedalen and Bergsdalen, with its borders extending into the mountains. The highest point in the municipality is the 1,264.43-metre (4,148.4 ft) tall mountain Skjerjavasshovden in the northern part of the municipality. Major lakes in the municipality include Askjelldalsvatnet and Skjerjavatnet.

The main centers of population are Dale (pop. 1,159), Vaksdal (pop. 941), and Stanghelle (pop. 801). Dale and Vaksdal are industrial villages that arose around factories utilising the hydro-electric power resources provided by the mountainous terrain and rainy climate. The Bergensbanen railway line between Norway's two largest cities Oslo and Bergen, and the main road between the same two cities, European route E16, run through Vaksdal municipality. The Bergensbanen railway line has the following stations in Vaksdal: Bogegrend Station, Dale Station, Stanghelle Station, and Vaksdal Station

== History ==
Vaksdal Municipality was created as a new municipality on 1 January 1964 after the merger of parts of Bruvik Municipality, Evanger Municipality, and Modalen Municipality.

During the German invasion of Norway during World War II, from 19 April to 24 April, there was heavy fighting in the areas that make up the present municipality, with German forces advancing along the railway line from Bergen towards Voss. The heaviest fighting was for the village of Vaksdal itself, from 19 to 23 April. Further fighting took place at Stanghelle and Dalseid on 23 and 24 April. Three Norwegian soldiers and one civilian, and a larger, but unknown, number of German soldiers fell in Vaksdal.

== Government ==
Vaksdal Municipality is responsible for primary education (through 10th grade), outpatient health services, senior citizen services, welfare and other social services, zoning, economic development, and municipal roads and utilities. The municipality is governed by a municipal council of directly elected representatives. The mayor is indirectly elected by a vote of the municipal council. The municipality is under the jurisdiction of the Hordaland District Court and the Gulating Court of Appeal.

=== Municipal council ===
The municipal council (Kommunestyre) of Vaksdal Municipality is made up of 21 representatives that are elected to four-year terms. The tables below show the current and historical composition of the council by political party.

Vaksdal kommunestyre 2023–2027
Party name (in Nynorsk)	Number of representatives
Labour Party (Arbeidarpartiet)	4
Progress Party (Framstegspartiet)	2
Conservative Party (Høgre)	3
Industry and Business Party (Industri‑ og Næringspartiet)	3
Christian Democratic Party (Kristeleg Folkeparti)	1
Red Party (Raudt)	1
Centre Party (Senterpartiet)	4
Socialist Left Party (Sosialistisk Venstreparti)	3
Total number of members:	21

Vaksdal kommunestyre 2019–2023
Party name (in Nynorsk)	Number of representatives
Labour Party (Arbeidarpartiet)	6
Progress Party (Framstegspartiet)	2
Conservative Party (Høgre)	4
Christian Democratic Party (Kristeleg Folkeparti)	1
Centre Party (Senterpartiet)	4
Socialist Left Party (Sosialistisk Venstreparti)	4
Total number of members:	21

Vaksdal kommunestyre 2015–2019
Party name (in Nynorsk)	Number of representatives
Labour Party (Arbeidarpartiet)	8
Progress Party (Framstegspartiet)	1
Green Party (Miljøpartiet Dei Grøne)	1
Conservative Party (Høgre)	2
Christian Democratic Party (Kristeleg Folkeparti)	2
Centre Party (Senterpartiet)	4
Socialist Left Party (Sosialistisk Venstreparti)	3
Total number of members:	21

Vaksdal kommunestyre 2011–2015
Party name (in Nynorsk)	Number of representatives
Labour Party (Arbeidarpartiet)	10
Progress Party (Framstegspartiet)	1
Conservative Party (Høgre)	4
Christian Democratic Party (Kristeleg Folkeparti)	2
Centre Party (Senterpartiet)	3
Socialist Left Party (Sosialistisk Venstreparti)	1
Total number of members:	21

Vaksdal kommunestyre 2007–2011
Party name (in Nynorsk)	Number of representatives
Labour Party (Arbeidarpartiet)	9
Progress Party (Framstegspartiet)	2
Conservative Party (Høgre)	3
Christian Democratic Party (Kristeleg Folkeparti)	3
Centre Party (Senterpartiet)	2
Socialist Left Party (Sosialistisk Venstreparti)	2
Total number of members:	21

Vaksdal kommunestyre 2003–2007
Party name (in Nynorsk)	Number of representatives
Labour Party (Arbeidarpartiet)	6
Progress Party (Framstegspartiet)	2
Conservative Party (Høgre)	4
Centre Party (Senterpartiet)	2
Local list for Stamnes/Eidsland (Bygdalista for Stamnes/Eidsland)	2
Local list for Vaksdal (Bygdelista for Vaksdal)	3
Unity and Development List (Samling og Utvikling)	2
Total number of members:	21

Vaksdal kommunestyre 1999–2003
Party name (in Nynorsk)	Number of representatives
Labour Party (Arbeidarpartiet)	8
Progress Party (Framstegspartiet)	2
Conservative Party (Høgre)	4
Christian Democratic Party (Kristeleg Folkeparti)	3
Centre Party (Senterpartiet)	3
Liberal Party (Venstre)	1
Local list for Stamnes/Eidsland (Bygdalista for Stamnes/Eidsland)	4
Environment and development list (Miljø og utvikling liste)	1
Independent Common List (Uavhengig samlingsliste)	3
Total number of members:	29

Vaksdal kommunestyre 1995–1999
Party name (in Nynorsk)	Number of representatives
Labour Party (Arbeidarpartiet)	10
Conservative Party (Høgre)	5
Christian Democratic Party (Kristeleg Folkeparti)	3
Centre Party (Senterpartiet)	4
Liberal Party (Venstre)	2
Local list for Stamnes (Bygdalista for Stamnes)	2
Independent Common List (Uavhengig samlingsliste)	3
Total number of members:	29

Vaksdal kommunestyre 1991–1995
Party name (in Nynorsk)	Number of representatives
Labour Party (Arbeidarpartiet)	12
Progress Party (Framstegspartiet)	1
Conservative Party (Høgre)	3
Christian Democratic Party (Kristeleg Folkeparti)	3
Centre Party (Senterpartiet)	5
Socialist Left Party (Sosialistisk Venstreparti)	3
Local list for Stamnes (Bygdalista for Stamnes)	2
Total number of members:	29

Vaksdal kommunestyre 1987–1991
Party name (in Nynorsk)	Number of representatives
Labour Party (Arbeidarpartiet)	13
Progress Party (Framstegspartiet)	1
Conservative Party (Høgre)	5
Christian Democratic Party (Kristeleg Folkeparti)	4
Centre Party (Senterpartiet)	3
Socialist Left Party (Sosialistisk Venstreparti)	2
Joint list of the Liberal Party (Venstre) and Liberal People's Party (Liberale Folkepartiet)	1
Total number of members:	29

Vaksdal kommunestyre 1983–1987
Party name (in Nynorsk)	Number of representatives
Labour Party (Arbeidarpartiet)	13
Progress Party (Framstegspartiet)	1
Conservative Party (Høgre)	4
Christian Democratic Party (Kristeleg Folkeparti)	4
Liberal People's Party (Liberale Folkepartiet)	1
Socialist Left Party (Sosialistisk Venstreparti)	2
Joint list of the Centre Party (Senterpartiet) and the Liberal Party (Venstre)	4
Total number of members:	29

Vaksdal kommunestyre 1979–1983
Party name (in Nynorsk)	Number of representatives
Labour Party (Arbeidarpartiet)	15
Conservative Party (Høgre)	4
Christian Democratic Party (Kristeleg Folkeparti)	6
New People's Party (Nye Folkepartiet)	1
Centre Party (Senterpartiet)	3
Socialist Left Party (Sosialistisk Venstreparti)	1
Liberal Party (Venstre)	1
Total number of members:	31

Vaksdal kommunestyre 1975–1979
Party name (in Nynorsk)	Number of representatives
Labour Party (Arbeidarpartiet)	17
Conservative Party (Høgre)	1
Christian Democratic Party (Kristeleg Folkeparti)	6
New People's Party (Nye Folkepartiet)	3
Centre Party (Senterpartiet)	4
Total number of members:	31

Vaksdal kommunestyre 1971–1975
Party name (in Nynorsk)	Number of representatives
Labour Party (Arbeidarpartiet)	17
Conservative Party (Høgre)	1
Christian Democratic Party (Kristeleg Folkeparti)	5
Centre Party (Senterpartiet)	4
Liberal Party (Venstre)	4
Total number of members:	31

Vaksdal kommunestyre 1967–1971
Party name (in Nynorsk)	Number of representatives
Labour Party (Arbeidarpartiet)	17
Conservative Party (Høgre)	1
Christian Democratic Party (Kristeleg Folkeparti)	4
Centre Party (Senterpartiet)	3
Socialist People's Party (Sosialistisk Folkeparti)	1
Liberal Party (Venstre)	4
Local List(s) (Lokale lister)	1
Total number of members:	31

Vaksdal kommunestyre 1963–1967
Party name (in Nynorsk)	Number of representatives
Labour Party (Arbeidarpartiet)	18
Christian Democratic Party (Kristeleg Folkeparti)	4
Centre Party (Senterpartiet)	3
Socialist People's Party (Sosialistisk Folkeparti)	1
Liberal Party (Venstre)	4
Joint List(s) of Non-Socialist Parties (Borgarlege Felleslister)	1
Total number of members:	31
Note: On 1 January 1964, Vaksdal Municipality was created from parts of Bruvik Municipality, Evanger Municipality, and Modalen Municipality.

=== Mayor ===
The mayor (Nynorsk: ordførar) of Vaksdal Municipality is the political leader of the municipality and the chairperson of the municipal council. Here is a list of people who have held this position:

- 1964–1967: Arnold Prestegaard (Ap)
- 1967–1969: Otto Vågen (Ap)
- 1969–1971: Arnold Prestegaard (Ap)
- 1971–1983: Idar Soltvedt (Ap)
- 1983–1999: Otto Berg (Ap)
- 1999–2007: Øivind Olsnes (H)
- 2007–2019: Eirik Haga (Ap)
- 2019–present: Hege Eide Vik (Sp)

=== Police ===
In 2016, the chief of police for Vestlandet formally suggested a reconfiguration of police districts and stations. He proposed that the police station in Vaksdal be closed.

== Notable people ==
- Harald Langhelle (1890 in Dale – executed 1942), a newspaper editor, politician, and Norwegian resistance member
- Bjørn Wiik (1937 in Bruvik - 1999), an elementary particle physicist
- Sjur Olsnes (1939–2014), a biochemist and academic who grew up in Vaksdal
- Helén Eriksen (born 1971 in Dale), a jazz musician (saxophone and vocals), songwriter, and music arranger
- Trond Egil Soltvedt(Born 1967 in Stanghelle), a former professional football player for English Premier League clubs
- Frida Amundsen (born 1992 in Vaksdal), a singer and songwriter
