= Nesheim Church =

Church in Vestland, Norway

- Nesheim kyrkje
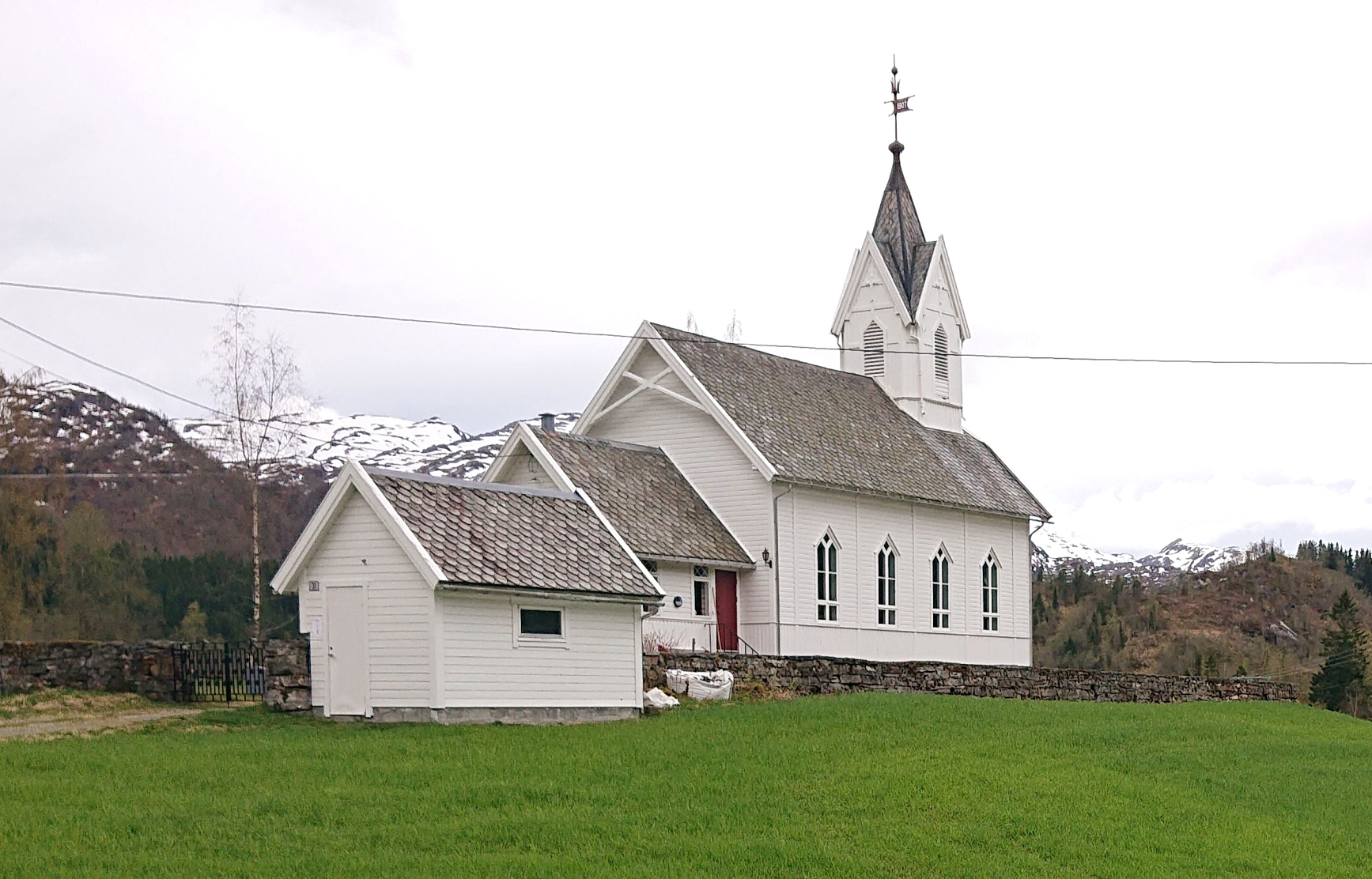
- View of the church
- Nesheim Church
- 60°47′56″N 6°09′20″E
- Location: Vaksdal, Vestland
- Country: Norway
- Denomination: Church of Norway
- Previous denomination: Catholic Church
- Churchmanship: Evangelical Lutheran

History
- Status: Parish church
- Founded: 1908
- Consecrated: 17 Sep 1908

Architecture
- Functional status: Active
- Architect: Adolf Schirmer
- Architectural type: Long church
- Completed: 1908 (118 years ago)

Specifications
- Capacity: 120
- Materials: Wood

Administration
- Diocese: Bjørgvin bispedømme
- Deanery: Hardanger og Voss prosti
- Parish: Nesheim
- Norwegian Cultural Heritage Site
- Type: Church
- Status: Listed
- ID: 85120

Nesheim Church (Norwegian: Nesheim kyrkje) is a parish church of the Church of Norway in Vaksdal Municipality in Vestland county, Norway. It is located in the village of Nesheim. It is the church for the Nesheim parish which is part of the Hardanger og Voss prosti (deanery) in the Diocese of Bjørgvin. The white, wooden church was built in a long church design in 1908 using plans drawn up by the architect Adolf Schirmer (one source credits Hartvig Sverdrup Eckhoff). The church seats about 120 people.

== History ==
The church was consecrated on 17 September 1908 by the Bishop Johan Willoch Erichsen. Originally the church had a small sacristy adjacent to the chancel, but in 1973, the old sacristy was enlarged.

== See also ==
- List of churches in Bjørgvin
