= Nesheim, Vaksdal =

Village in Vaksdal Municipality, Norway

Nesheim
- Village
- Interactive map of Nesheim
- Coordinates: 60.8°N 6.15°E
- Country: Norway
- Region: Western Norway
- County: Vestland
- District: Nordhordland
- Municipality: Vaksdal Municipality
- Elevation: 438 m (1,437 ft)
- Time zone: UTC+01:00 (CET)
  - Summer (DST): UTC+02:00 (CEST)
- Post Code: 5728 Eidslandet

Nesheim is a village in Vaksdal Municipality in Vestland county, Norway. The village is located in the upper part of the Eksingedalen valley, along the river Storelvi. The village sits at the intersection of two roads: County Road 5398, which runs through the whole valley and County Road 5410 which crosses the mountains into the next valley to the south, Teigdalen (in Voss Municipality). The village of Nesheim is the site of Nesheim Church.
