= Eksingedalen =

Valley in Vaksdal, Norway

- Eksingadalen (unofficial)
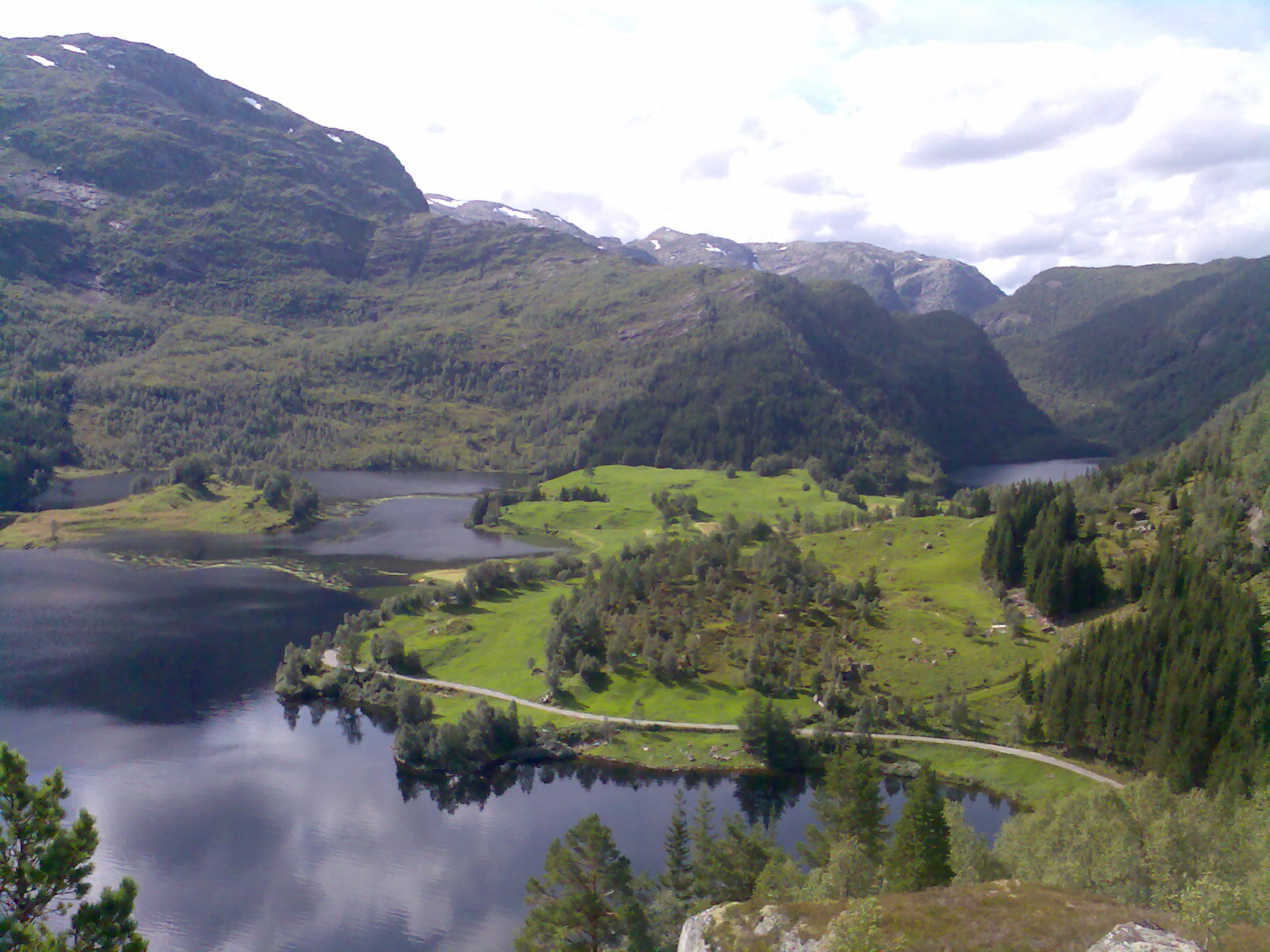
- View of the valley
- Length: 50 kilometres (31 mi) NE-SW
- Width: 1.5 kilometres (0.93 mi)

Geology
- Type: River valley

Geography
- Location: Vestland, Norway
- Coordinates: 60°46′53″N 05°52′30″E
- River: River Ekso

Location
- Interactive map of Eksingedalen

Eksingedalen is a river valley that makes up the northeastern part of Vaksdal Municipality in Vestland County, Norway.

The Eksingedalen valley stretches over 50 kilometres (31 mi) from the Vikafjell mountains all the way to the Inner Osterfjorden. The Ekso River (also known as the Storelvi River) runs through the entire valley, from alpine lakes all the way down to the Eidsfjorden, a small branch off the Inner Osterfjorden. The Stølsheimen Mountains surround the Eksingedalen valley. At 1,433 metres (4,701 ft) above sea level, Kvitanosi is the highest mountain peak around the Eksingedalen valley. Modalen Municipality and the Modalen valley lies over the mountains to the north and the Modalen Tunnel connects the two valleys.

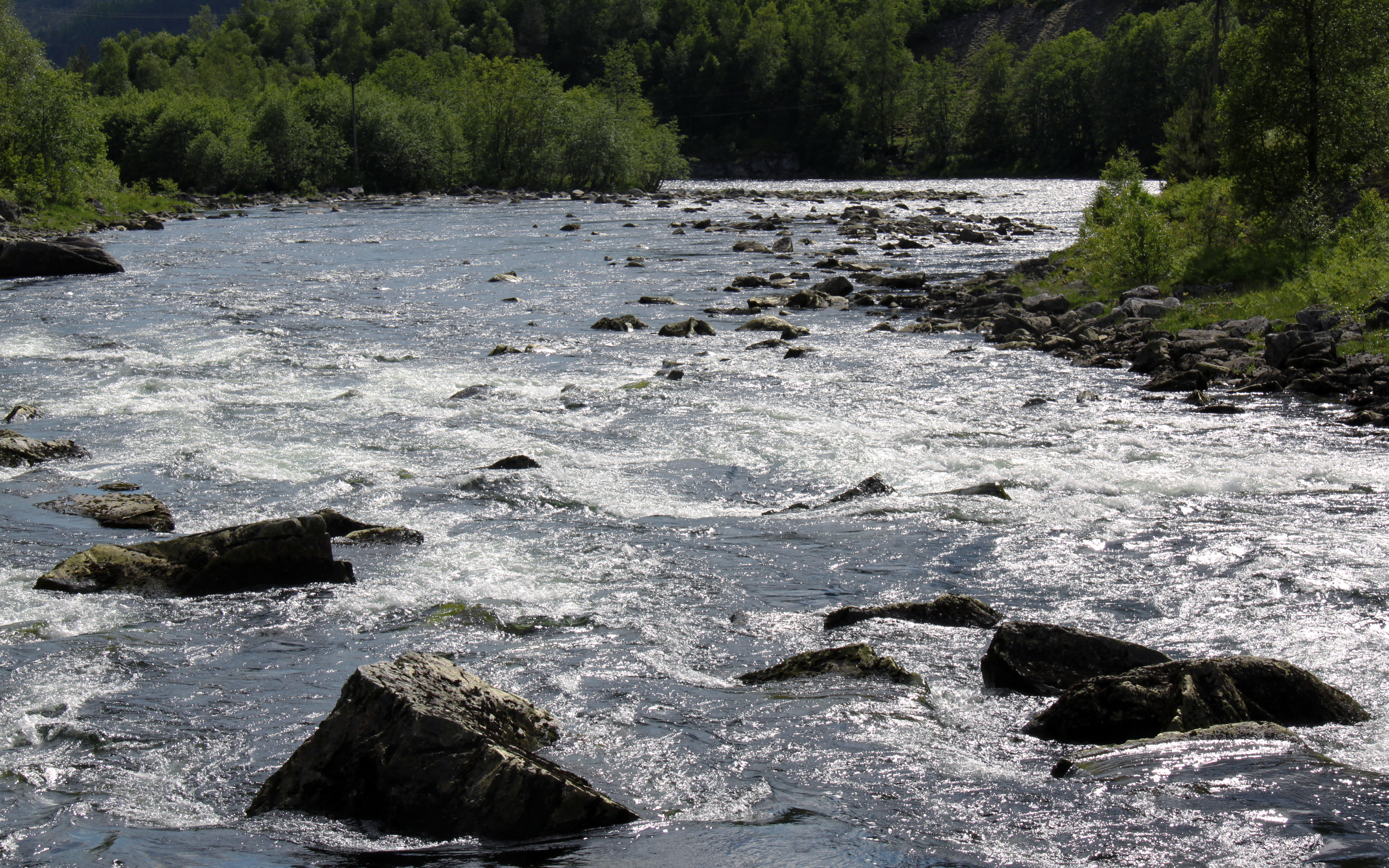
Ekso River

Mainly a farming area, about 200-300 people live in Eksingedalen. It is the site of a number of traditional farms including the historic Gullbrå, Ekse, and Trefall farms. Inga Litamor (Choral EG 168. 1901) a composition by Edvard Grieg was based on a traditional folk melody from Eksingedalen.

The village of Eidslandet is situated in the lower parts of Eksingedalen at the head of Eidsfjorden, an arm of the inner Osterfjorden. The Myster kraftverk hydroelectric power plant is headquartered in Eidslandet. Myster kraftverk is owned and operated by Eviny.

The village of Flatkvål is located about 10 kilometres (6.2 mi) northeast of Eidslandet and the village of Nesheim lies another 15 kilometres (9.3 mi) northeast of Flatkvål. County Road 5398 runs through most of the valley, and County Road 569 running from the Modalen Tunnel to the southern end of the valley. Eksingedal Church and Nesheim Church are both located in the valley.
