= Modalen Municipality =

Municipality in Vestland, Norway

Modalen Municipality Modalen kommune
- Municipality
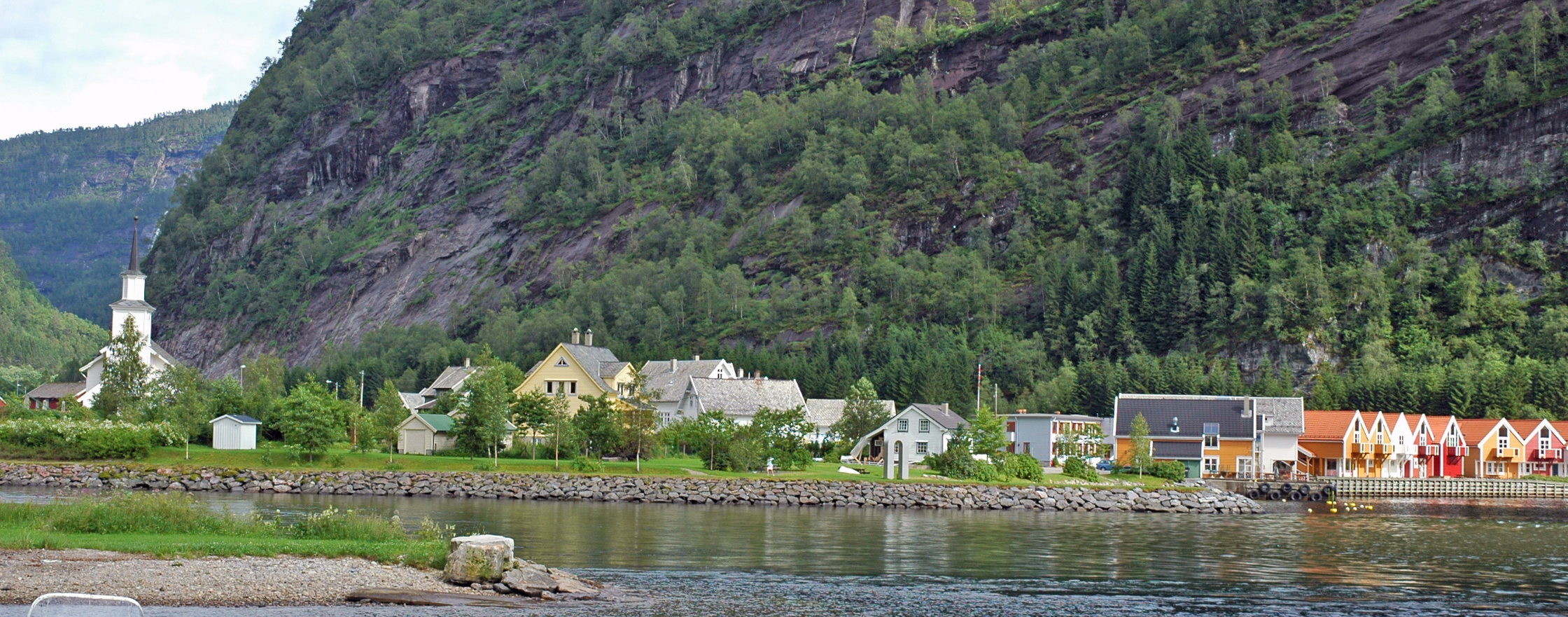
- View of Mo in Modalen

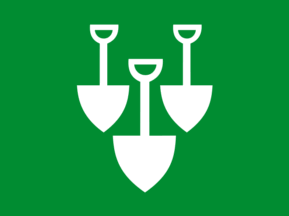
- Flag Coat of arms

- Vestland within Norway

- Modalen within Vestland
- Coordinates: 60°52′50″N 05°55′31″E
- Country: Norway
- County: Vestland
- District: Nordhordland
- Established: 1 Jan 1910
  - Preceded by: Hosanger Municipality
- Administrative centre: Mo

Government
  - Mayor (2023): Linda Neset (LL)

Area
  - Total: 411.98 km^{2} (159.07 sq mi)
  - Land: 379.08 km^{2} (146.36 sq mi)
  - Water: 32.90 km^{2} (12.70 sq mi) 8%
  - Rank: #235 in Norway
- Highest elevation: 1,289.36 m (4,230.2 ft)

Population (2025)
  - Total: 392
  - Rank: #356 in Norway
  - Density: 1/km^{2} (2.6/sq mi)
  - Change (10 years): ▲ +3.2%
- Demonym: Modøl

Official language
  - Norwegian form: Nynorsk
- Time zone: UTC+01:00 (CET)
  - Summer (DST): UTC+02:00 (CEST)
- ISO 3166 code: NO-4629
- Website: Official website

Modalen is a municipality in the Nordhordland district in the central part of Vestland county in Norway. The administrative centre of the municipality is the village of Mo. The other main village in the municipality is Øvre Helland. Most of the residents of Modalen Municipality live in the main Modalen valley which extends eastwards from the end of the Romarheimsfjorden.

The 412-square-kilometre (159 sq mi) municipality is the 236th largest by area out of the 357 municipalities in Norway. Modalen Municipality is the 356th most populous municipality in Norway with a population of 392 (making it the second smallest municipality in Norway after Utsira Municipality). The municipality's population density is 1 inhabitant per square kilometre (2.6/sq mi) and its population has increased by 3.2% over the previous 10-year period.

The small population, combined with a large income from hydro-electric power production, has given the municipality the ability to give all its residents free wireless internet access in the municipality. They also were the first Norwegian municipality to buy a computer for all students in the municipality in 1993.

== General information ==
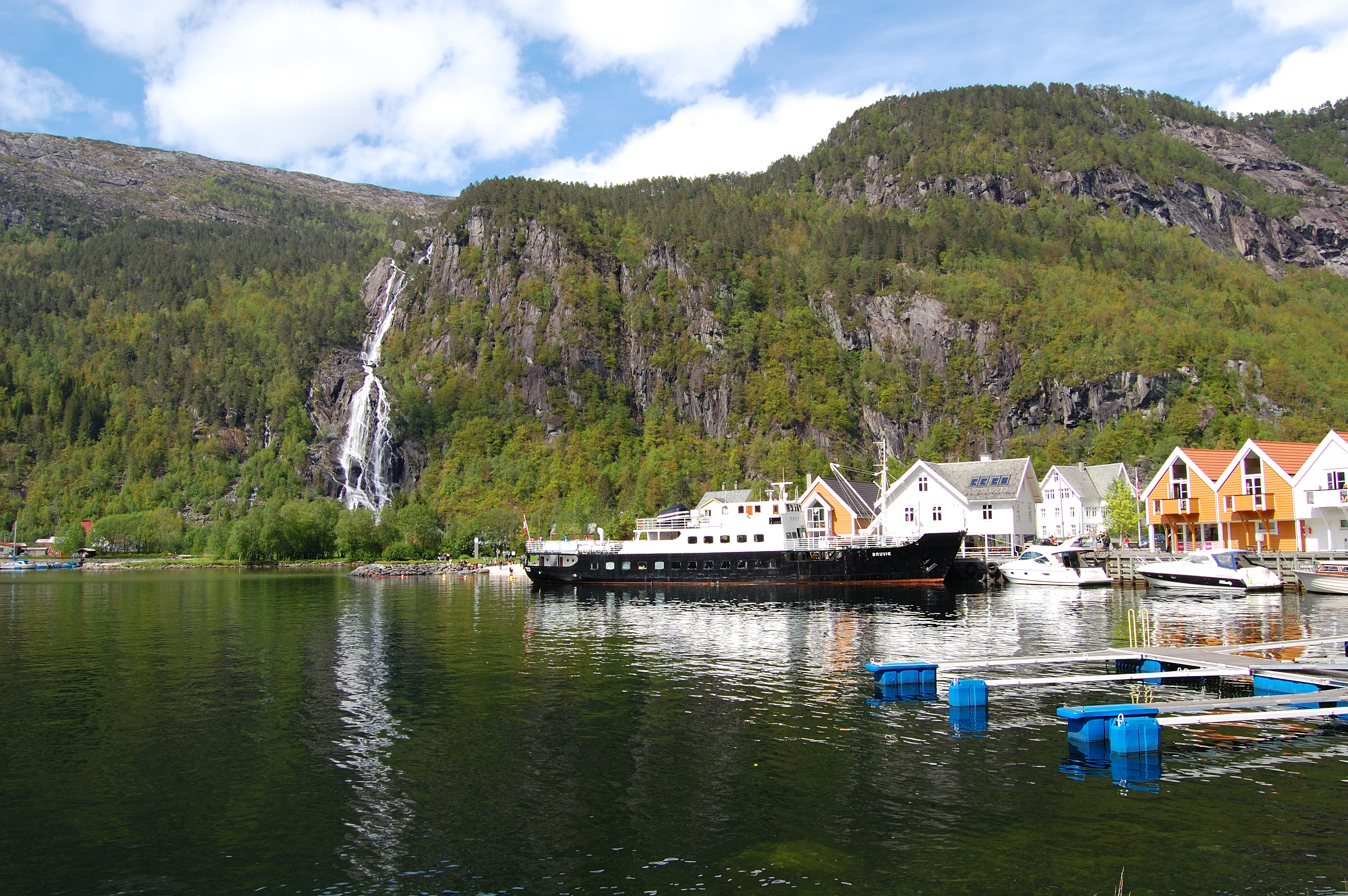
View of the village of Mo

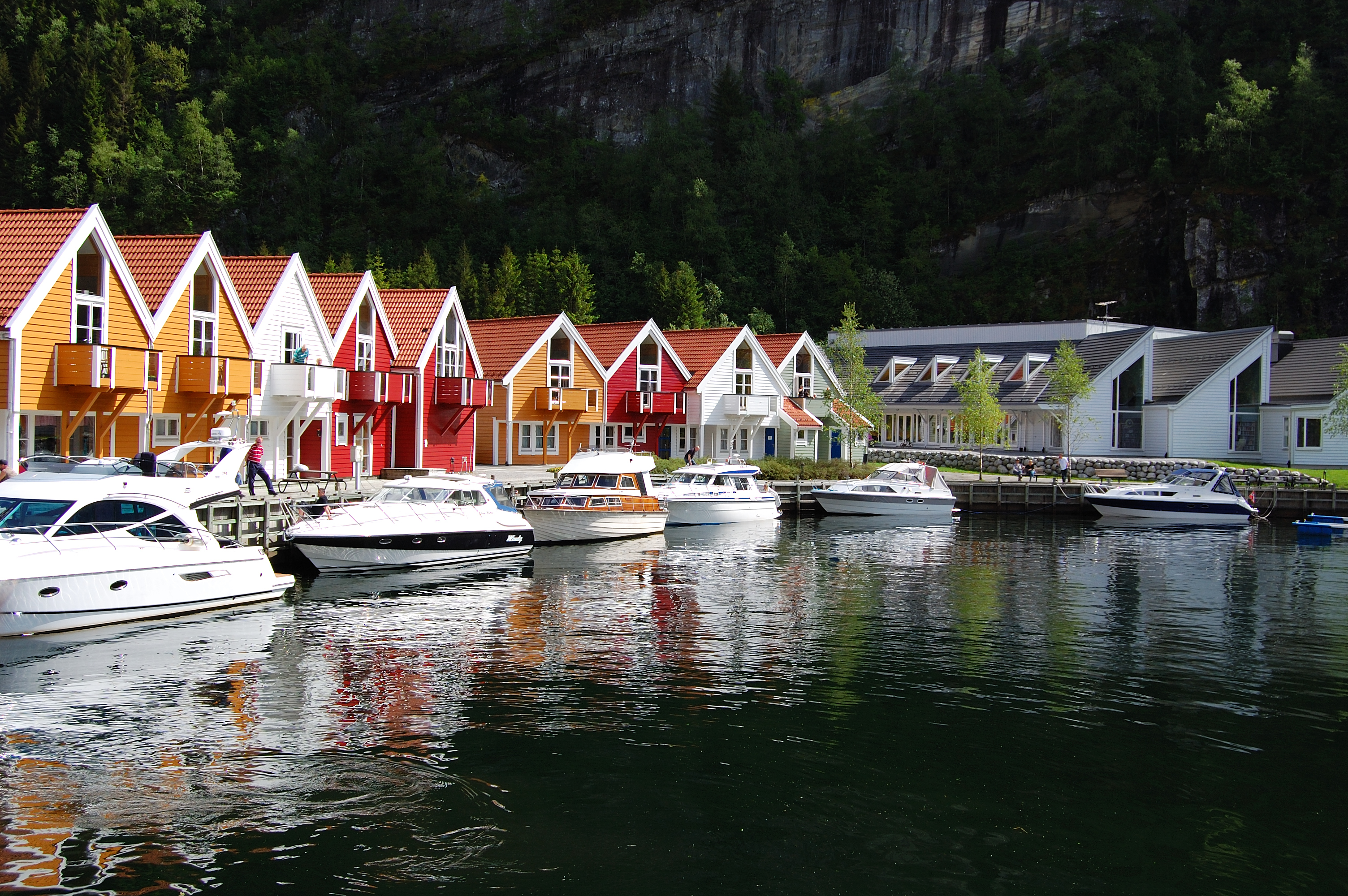
Another view of Mo

The parish of Modalen was established on 1 January 1910 when the old Hosanger Municipality was divided. The northeastern part of municipality (population: 821) became the new Modalen Municipality and the rest of the municipality (population: 2,524) remained as a smaller Hosanger Municipality.

During the 1960s, there were many municipal mergers across Norway due to the work of the Schei Committee. On 1 January 1964, the middle part of the Eksingedalen valley (population: 151) was transferred from Modalen Municipality to the neighboring of Vaksdal Municipality. Also on that date, the Nipo, Dyrkolbotn, and Eitrdalen farm areas (population: 12), located north of the village of Romarheim, were transferred from Modalen Municipality to the neighboring Lindås Municipality.

Historically, this municipality was part of the old Hordaland county. On 1 January 2020, the municipality became a part of the newly-formed Vestland county (after Hordaland and Sogn og Fjordane counties were merged).

=== Name ===
The municipality (originally the parish) is named after the old Mo farm (Old Norse: Mór) since the first Mo Church was built there in the Middle Ages. The first element is mór which means "heath" or "moor". The last element, dalen, was added later and it is derived from the old word dalr which means "valley" or "dale".

=== Coat of arms ===
The coat of arms was granted on 2 November 1984. The official blazon is "Vert, three spades palewise two and one argent" (Norwegian: På grøn grunn tre kvite spadar, 2-1). This means the arms have a green field (background) and the charge is a set of three spades aligned vertically with the center one sitting lower than the others. The charge has a tincture of argent which means it is commonly colored white, but if it is made out of metal, then silver is used. The spades are a symbol for the agriculture and sand digging in the municipality, which historically were of great importance. The arms were designed by Egil Korsnes. The municipal flag has the same design as the coat of arms.

=== Churches ===
The Church of Norway has one parish (sokn) within Modalen Municipality. It is part of the Nordhordland prosti (deanery) in the Diocese of Bjørgvin.

Churches in Modalen Municipality
Parish (sokn)	Church name	Location of the church	Year built
Mo	Mo Church	Mo	1883

== History ==
=== The Modalen project ===
In 2001, Modalen Municipality got a 2-megabit broadband connection. The idea was to make Modalen the world's first fully-connected wireless broadband community. The municipality was the first in Norway to undergo an all-broadband project as part of an effort by the Norwegian government to achieve full broadband coverage nationwide by 2004.

== Government ==
Modalen Municipality is responsible for primary education (through 10th grade), outpatient health services, senior citizen services, welfare and other social services, zoning, economic development, and municipal roads and utilities. The municipality is governed by a municipal council of directly elected representatives. The mayor is indirectly elected by a vote of the municipal council. The municipality is under the jurisdiction of the Nordhordland District Court and the Gulating Court of Appeal.

=== Municipal council ===
The municipal council (Kommunestyre) of Modalen Municipality is made up of 13 representatives that are elected every four years. Modalen is the only municipality in Norway that has a non-partisan council, so all representatives run on local lists rather than by party. The tables below show the current and historical composition of the council.

Modalen kommunestyre 2023–2027
Party name (in Nynorsk)	Number of representatives
Samlingslista (Common List)	6
Solrenningslista (Sunrise List)	7
Total number of members:	13

Modalen kommunestyre 2019–2023
Party name (in Nynorsk)	Number of representatives
Samlingslista (Common List)	7
Solrenningslista (Sunrise List)	6
Total number of members:	13

Modalen kommunestyre 2015–2019
Party name (in Nynorsk)	Number of representatives
Samlingslista (Common List)	6
Solrenningslista (Sunrise List)	7
Total number of members:	13

Modalen kommunestyre 2011–2015
Party name (in Nynorsk)	Number of representatives
Samlingslista (Common List)	7
Solrenningslista (Sunrise List)	6
Total number of members:	13

Modalen kommunestyre 2007–2011
Party name (in Nynorsk)	Number of representatives
Samlingslista (Common List)	5
Solrenningslista (Sunrise List)	8
Total number of members:	13

Modalen kommunestyre 2003–2007
Party name (in Nynorsk)	Number of representatives
Samlingslista (Common List)	8
Solrenningslista (Sunrise List)	5
Total number of members:	13

Modalen kommunestyre 1999–2003
Party name (in Nynorsk)	Number of representatives
Common Election List (Flertallsvalg)	13
Total number of members:	13

=== Mayors ===
The mayor (Nynorsk: ordførar) of Modalen Municipality is the political leader of the municipality and the chairperson of the municipal council. Here is a list of people who have held this position:

- 1910–1913: Andres Lavik (V)
- 1914–1919: Ivar K. Straume
- 1920–1922: Johan Otterstad
- 1923–1925: Ivar K. Straume
- 1926–1931: Olav Vetlejord
- 1932–1947: Anders Otterstad
- 1948–1952: Karl Farestveit
- 1952–1955: Knut Helland
- 1956–1963: Magne Vetlejord (Bp)
- 1963–1967: Bjarne Jakobsen Nygaard (LL)
- 1967–1983: Johannes O. Mo (LL)
- 1983–1991: Leif Egil Nåmdal (LL)
- 1991–1995: Kari Nygard (LL)
- 1995–2003: Leif Egil Nåmdal (LL)
- 2003–2015: Knut Moe (LL)
- 2015–2019: Tom Kristian Thorsen (LL)
- 2019–2023: Kjetil Eikefet (LL)
- 2023–present: Linda Neset (LL)

== Population ==
Historical population
Year	1910	1920	1930	1946	1951	1960	1970	1980	1990	2000	2010	2020	2023
Pop.	821	779	729	713	627	544	295	313	340	354	344	388	380
±% p.a.	—	−0.52%	−0.66%	−0.14%	−2.54%	−1.57%	−5.94%	+0.59%	+0.83%	+0.40%	−0.29%	+1.21%	−0.69%
Note: The municipal borders were changed in 1964, causing a significant change in the population. Source: Statistics Norway and Norwegian Historical Data Centre

== Geography ==
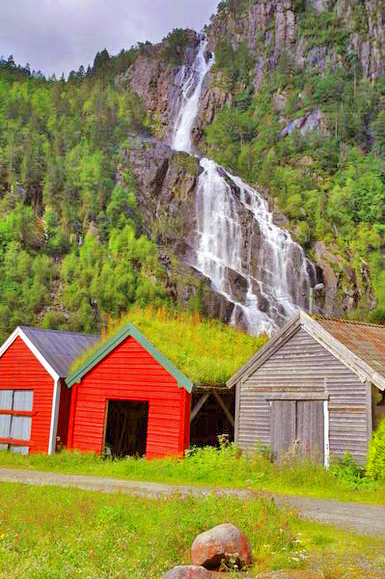
View of the Kvernhusfossen waterfall

Modalen Municipality sits in the central part of Vestland county. It surrounds the innermost part of the Romarheimsfjorden (which is also called the Mofjorden) and the Modalen valley which extends eastwards from the end of the fjord. Both sides of the valley are mountainous, so the municipality is quite isolated with only two roads connecting it to the outside world. Both roads were constructed fairly recently, and before that time, the municipality was only accessible by boat or crossing mountains on foot. The Modalen Tunnel was built in 1976 and it connects this valley to the Eksingedalen valley to the south. The other road was finished in 1996, and it follows the fjord heading west to Alver Municipality.

The Modalen valley centers around the river Moelva. The lake Steinslandsvatnet, in the central part of the municipality, is the headwaters of the river. The high mountains that surround the valley provide many sources of hydroelectric power such as the lake Skjerjavatnet. The highest point in the municipality is the 1,289.36-metre (4,230.2 ft) tall mountain Runderabben, located on the border with Høyanger Municipality.

Modalen Municipality borders Høyanger Municipality to the north, Vik Municipality to the east, Vaksdal Municipality to the south, and Alver Municipality and Masfjorden Municipality to the west.

== Notable people ==
- Andres Lavik (1852–1941), a farmer, politician, and mayor of Modalen Municipality in 1910
- Olav Nygard (1884 in Modalen – 1924), a poet
- Johannes Moe (born 1926 in Modalen), an engineer and research administrator
