= Austbygdi, Osterøy =

Village in Osterøy Municipality, Norway

Austbygdi
- Village
- Interactive map of Austbygdi
- Coordinates: 60.48502°N 5.55542°E
- Country: Norway
- Region: Western Norway
- County: Vestland
- District: Nordhordland
- Municipality: Osterøy Municipality
- Elevation: 141 m (463 ft)
- Time zone: UTC+01:00 (CET)
  - Summer (DST): UTC+02:00 (CEST)
- Post Code: 5282 Lonevåg

Austbygdi is a village in Osterøy Municipality in Vestland county, Norway. The village is located on the central part of the island of Osterøy, just south of the village of Gjerstad, and about halfway between the villages of Haus and Lonevåg.
