= Gjerstad, Vestland =

Village in Osterøy Municipality, Norway

Gjerstad
- Village
- Interactive map of Gjerstad
- Coordinates: 60.50214°N 5.54636°E
- Country: Norway
- Region: Western Norway
- County: Vestland
- District: Nordhordland
- Municipality: Osterøy Municipality
- Elevation: 57 m (187 ft)
- Time zone: UTC+01:00 (CET)
  - Summer (DST): UTC+02:00 (CEST)
- Post Code: 5282 Lonevåg

Gjerstad is a village in Osterøy Municipality in Vestland county, Norway. The village is located in the central part of the island of Osterøy, just north of the village of Austbygdi. The municipal centre of Lonevåg lies about 4 kilometres (2.5 mi) north of Gjerstad. Gjerstad Church is located in this village, serving the central part of the island.
