= Hamre Municipality =

Former municipality in Hordaland, Norway

Hamre Municipality Hamre herad
- Former municipality
- Hammer herred (historic name)
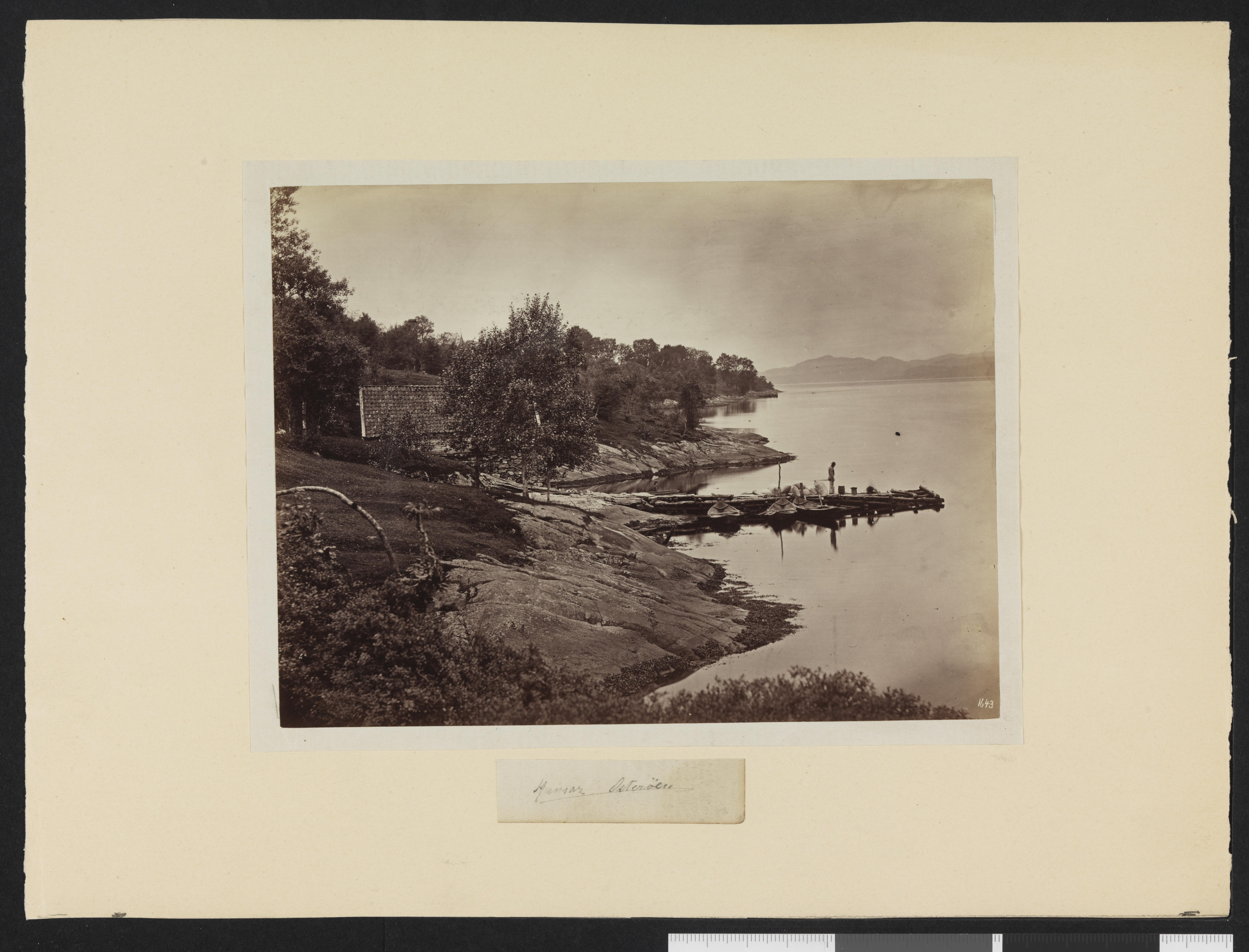
- View of the Hamre coast (c. 1875)

- Hordaland within Norway

- Hamre within Hordaland
- Coordinates: 60°32′47″N 05°21′30″E
- Country: Norway
- County: Hordaland
- District: Nordhordland
- Established: 1 Jan 1838
  - Created as: Formannskapsdistrikt
- Disestablished: 1 Jan 1964
  - Succeeded by: Lindås, Osterøy, and Meland municipalities
- Administrative centre: Hamre

Government
  - Mayor (1955–1964): Eivind Rundhovde (H)

Area (upon dissolution)
  - Total: 80.8 km^{2} (31.2 sq mi)
  - Rank: #545 in Norway
- Highest elevation: 430 m (1,410 ft)

Population (1963)
  - Total: 2,579
  - Rank: #354 in Norway
  - Density: 31.9/km^{2} (83/sq mi)
  - Change (10 years): ▼ −7.2%
- Demonym: Hamarsokning

Official language
  - Norwegian form: Nynorsk
- Time zone: UTC+01:00 (CET)
  - Summer (DST): UTC+02:00 (CEST)
- ISO 3166 code: NO-1254

Hamre (historically, Hammer) is a former municipality in the old Hordaland county, Norway. The 80.8-square-kilometre (31.2 sq mi) municipality existed from 1838 until its dissolution in 1964. The area is now divided between Alver Municipality and Osterøy Municipality in the traditional district of Nordhordland in Vestland county. The administrative centre was the village of Hamre, where Hamre Church was located.

Prior to its dissolution in 1964, the 80.8-square-kilometre (31.2 sq mi) municipality was the 545th largest by area out of the 689 municipalities in Norway. Hamre Municipality was the 354th most populous municipality in Norway with a population of about 2,579. The municipality's population density was 31.9 inhabitants per square kilometre (83/sq mi) and its population had decreased by 7.2% over the previous 10-year period.

== General information ==
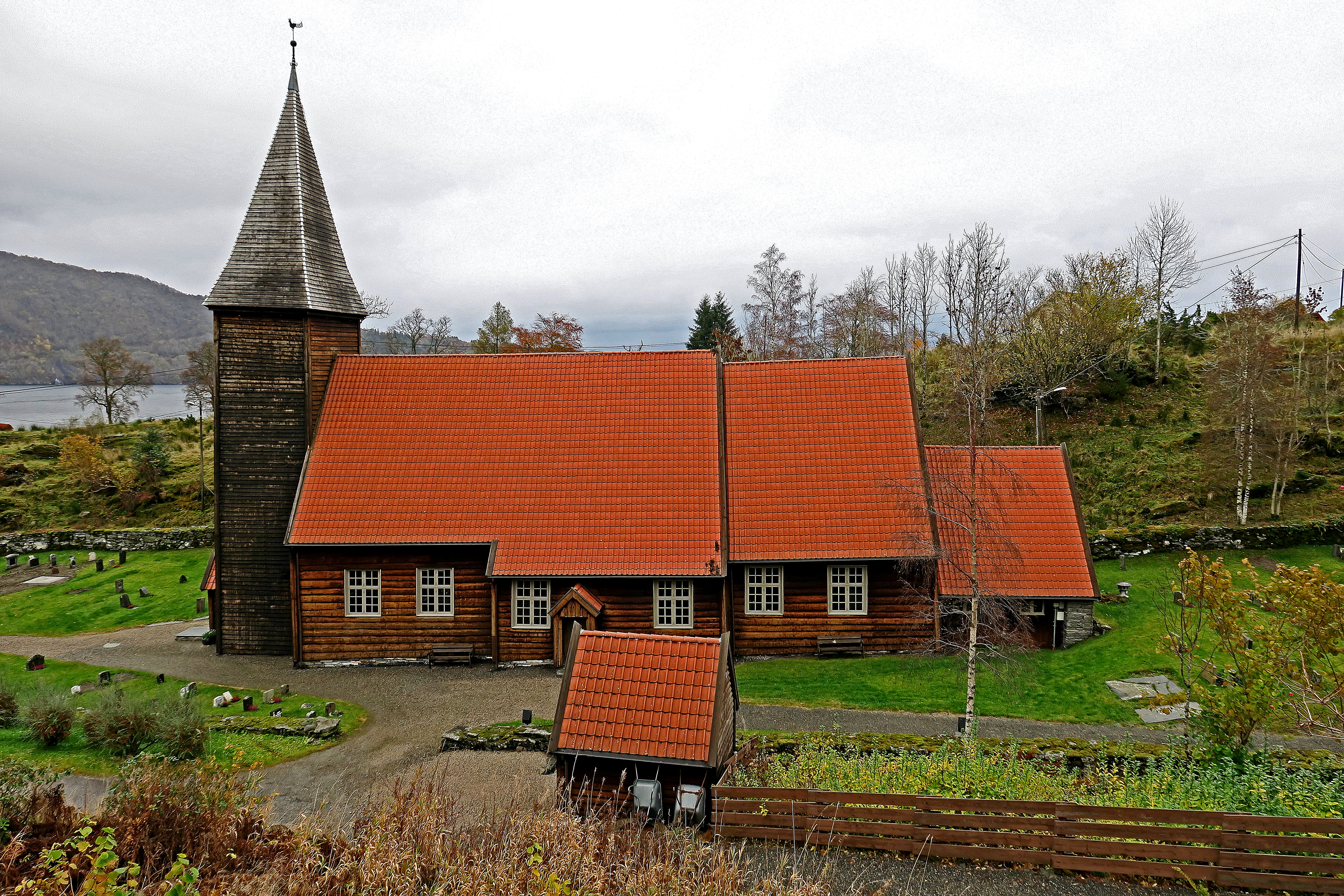
View of Hamre Church

The parish of Hammer (later spelled Hamre) was established as a municipality on 1 January 1838 (see formannskapsdistrikt law). On 1 January 1885, the northwestern district of Hamre on the island of Holsnøy and the area around the village of Alversund on the mainland (population: 2,793) was separated to become the new Alversund Municipality. After this split, Hammer Municipality had 3,737 residents.

On 1 January 1904, the western district of Hammer Municipality (population: 1,625) was separated to become the new Aasene Municipality (later spelled Åsane). The split left Hammer Municipality with a population of 2,914. On 1 July 1914 a part of western Hammer Municipality with 622 inhabitants was transferred to Åsane Municipality. The spelling of the name was changed from "Hammer" to "Hamre" by a royal resolution in 1915.

During the 1960s, there were many municipal mergers across Norway due to the work of the Schei Committee. On 1 January 1964, Hamre Municipality was dissolved and its lands were split up as follows:

- the island of Flatøy (population: 166) was transferred to Meland Municipality.
- the area on the northern coast of the Osterfjorden (population: 1,240) was transferred to Lindås Municipality.
- the area on the island of Osterøy (population: 1,166) became part of the newly-created Osterøy Municipality.

=== Name ===
The municipality (originally the parish) is named after the old Hammer farm (Old Norse: Hamarr) since the first Hamre Church was built there. The name is hamarr which means "crag", "rock face", or "steep cliff", likely referring to the local rocky and mountainous terrain. Historically, the name of the municipality was spelled Hammer. On 25 September 1914, a royal resolution changed the spelling of the name of the municipality to Hamre.

=== Churches ===
The Church of Norway had one parish (sokn) within Hamre Municipality. At the time of the municipal dissolution, it was part of the Hamre prestegjeld and the Nordhordland prosti (deanery) in the Diocese of Bjørgvin.

Churches in Hamre Municipality
Parish (sokn)	Church name	Location of the church	Year built
Svelvik	Hamre Church	Hamre	1622

== Geography ==
Hamre Municipality was once a large municipality, but over time it was reduced in size until it covered an area of about 81 square kilometres (31 sq mi) by the time it was dissolved in 1964. At that time, it encompassed land on both sides of the Osterfjorden on the Lindås peninsula on the north side and on the island of Osterøy on the south side. The highest point in the municipality was the 430-metre (1,410 ft) tall mountain Gladihaug.

Lindås Municipality was located to the north, Hosanger Municipality was located to the east, Haus Municipality was located to the southeast, Arna Municipality was located to the south, Åsane Municipality was located to the southwest, Meland Municipality was located to the west, and Alversund Municipality was located to the northwest.

== Government ==
While it existed, Hamre Municipality was responsible for primary education (through 10th grade), outpatient health services, senior citizen services, welfare and other social services, zoning, economic development, and municipal roads and utilities. The municipality was governed by a municipal council of directly elected representatives. The mayor was indirectly elected by a vote of the municipal council. The municipality was under the jurisdiction of the Gulating Court of Appeal.

=== Municipal council ===
The municipal council (Heradsstyre) of Hamre Municipality was made up of 17 representatives that were elected to four year terms. The tables below show the historical composition of the council by political party.

Hamre heradsstyre 1959–1963
Party name (in Nynorsk)	Number of representatives
Local List(s) (Lokale lister)	17
Total number of members:	17

Hamre heradsstyre 1955–1959
Party name (in Nynorsk)	Number of representatives
Local List(s) (Lokale lister)	17
Total number of members:	17

Hamre heradsstyre 1951–1955
Party name (in Nynorsk)	Number of representatives
Local List(s) (Lokale lister)	16
Total number of members:	16

Hamre heradsstyre 1947–1951
Party name (in Nynorsk)	Number of representatives
Local List(s) (Lokale lister)	16
Total number of members:	16

Hamre heradsstyre 1945–1947
Party name (in Nynorsk)	Number of representatives
Labour Party (Arbeidarpartiet)	1
Joint List(s) of Non-Socialist Parties (Borgarlege Felleslister)	8
Local List(s) (Lokale lister)	7
Total number of members:	16

Hamre heradsstyre 1937–1941*
Party name (in Nynorsk)	Number of representatives
Labour Party (Arbeidarpartiet)	2
Liberal Party (Venstre)	10
Local List(s) (Lokale lister)	4
Total number of members:	16
Note: Due to the German occupation of Norway during World War II, no elections were held for new municipal councils until after the war ended in 1945.

=== Mayors ===
The mayor (Nynorsk: ordførar) of Hamre Municipality was the political leader of the municipality and the chairperson of the municipal council. The following people held this position:

- 1838–1847: Rev. Johan Frøchen Dietrichson
- 1848–1851: Anbjørn Monsen Mælingen
- 1852–1857: Ole M. Erstad
- 1858–1859: Nils Olsen Ekanger
- 1860–1863: Hans Faye
- 1864–1867: Rasmus Eriksen Espelid
- 1868–1873: Nils Olsen Ekanger
- 1874–1877: A. Faye
- 1878–1879: Mons Iversen Espelid
- 1880–1883: Rasmus Eriksen Espelid
- 1884–1887: Anders Sandvik
- 1888–1898: Anders O. Tepstad
- 1899–1907: Mons Iversen Espelid
- 1908–1910: Johannes O. Eikanger
- 1911–1913: Mons Iversen Espelid
- 1914–1916: Johannes O. Eikanger
- 1917–1919: Magnus Heggertveit
- 1920–1922: Karl O. Leknes
- 1923–1937: Mons A. Leknes
- 1937–1938: Olav Hordvik (V)
- 1938–1941: Nils Østerbø (V)
- 1942–1945: Ragnvald Isdal (NS)
- 1945–1955: Nils Østerbø (V)
- 1955–1964: Eivind Rundhovde (H)

== See also ==
- List of former municipalities of Norway
