= Hamre Church =

Church in Vestland, Norway

- Hamre kyrkje
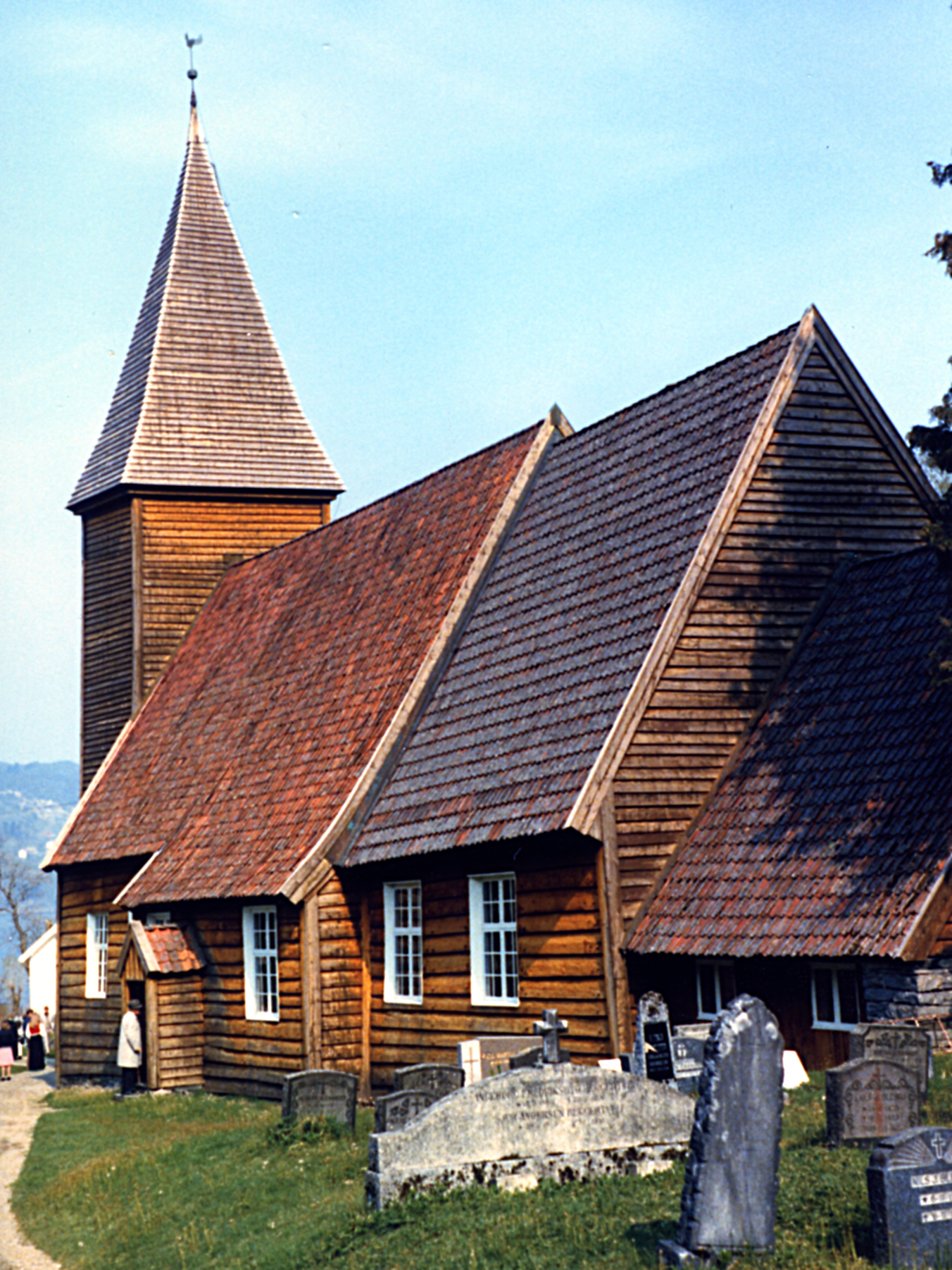
- View of the church
- Hamre Church
- 60°32′41″N 5°21′07″E
- Location: Osterøy Municipality, Vestland
- Country: Norway
- Denomination: Church of Norway
- Previous denomination: Catholic Church
- Churchmanship: Evangelical Lutheran

History
- Former name: Hammer kirke
- Status: Parish church
- Founded: 1024
- Consecrated: c. 1585

Architecture
- Functional status: Active
- Architectural type: Long church
- Completed: c. 1585 (441 years ago)

Specifications
- Capacity: 350
- Materials: Wood

Administration
- Diocese: Bjørgvin bispedømme
- Deanery: Åsane prosti
- Parish: Hamre
- Norwegian Cultural Heritage Site
- Type: Church
- Status: Automatically protected
- ID: 84478

Hamre Church (Norwegian: Hamre kyrkje) is a parish church of the Church of Norway in Osterøy Municipality in Vestland county, Norway. It is located in the village of Hamre. It is the church for the Hamre parish which is part of the Åsane prosti (deanery) in the Diocese of Bjørgvin. The wooden church was built in a long church design in the late 1500s (possibly in 1585) using plans drawn up by an unknown architect. The church seats about 350 people.

== History ==
The earliest existing historical records of the church date back to the year 1329, but the church was not built that year. The first church in Hamre was a wooden stave church that is thought to have been built in 1023 or 1024. There isn't much known about this church, but it was the main church for all of Nordhordland, and therefore it was much more important than the typical parish church. (Historians say it is possible that the stave church was the second church on the site and that an even older wooden church was the first church built in the 1020s.)

At some point, the old stave church was torn down and replaced by a new timber-framed long church building. The new timber church is clad with planks that probably originate from the old stave church. The present church at Hamre cannot be dated precisely. It was historically thought to have been built around 1622, but more recently an inscription on the old main door was found that suggests that it may have been built in 1585 (in which case it is the oldest existing wooden church to be built near Bergen). The wooden church was heavily renovated in 1649. Inside the church is a 1.4-metre (4 ft 7 in) high stone altar, which may indicate that the present church was built around the old stone altar from the historic stave church on the same site. The nave is rather unique in that it has a small extension in the middle of the nave, making that part about 2 metres (6 ft 7 in) wider than the rest of the nave, almost giving the church a cruciform appearance.

In 1814, this church served as an election church (Norwegian: valgkirke). Together with more than 300 other parish churches across Norway, it was a polling station for elections to the 1814 Norwegian Constituent Assembly which wrote the Constitution of Norway. This was Norway's first national election. Each church parish was a constituency that elected people called "electors" who later met together in each county to elect the representatives for the assembly that was to meet at Eidsvoll Manor later that year.

The church was partially rebuilt in 1859, and this included new, larger windows, among other things. In 1867, the decorations on the walls were repainted. The wall decoration was color restored in 1946–1948 by Ola Seter. The current sacristy extension in the southeast was built in 1948–1949 in connection with architectural restoration according to plans by Frederik Konow Lund. Where the sacristy now stands, there was previously a burial chapel for the Bull family from Valestrand. The small chapel had been moved elsewhere in 1879.

=== Parish structure ===
Historically, the church parish of Hamre included all of Nordhordland, with these subordinate churches: Mo Church, Alversund Church, Seim Church, Meland Church, Aasene Church, and Hosanger Church. In 1749, Hosanger, Seim, and Mo were separated to form their own parish. In 1871, Aasene was separated to form its own parish. In 1885, Alversund and Mæland joined Aasene parish. This left just Hamre as the only church in what was once a vast geographic parish. In 1967, the Hosanger parish was dissolved, and Hosanger Church was moved back to the Hamre parish. In 1975, both Hosanger and Hamre became part of the newly created Osterøy parish.

== Media gallery ==
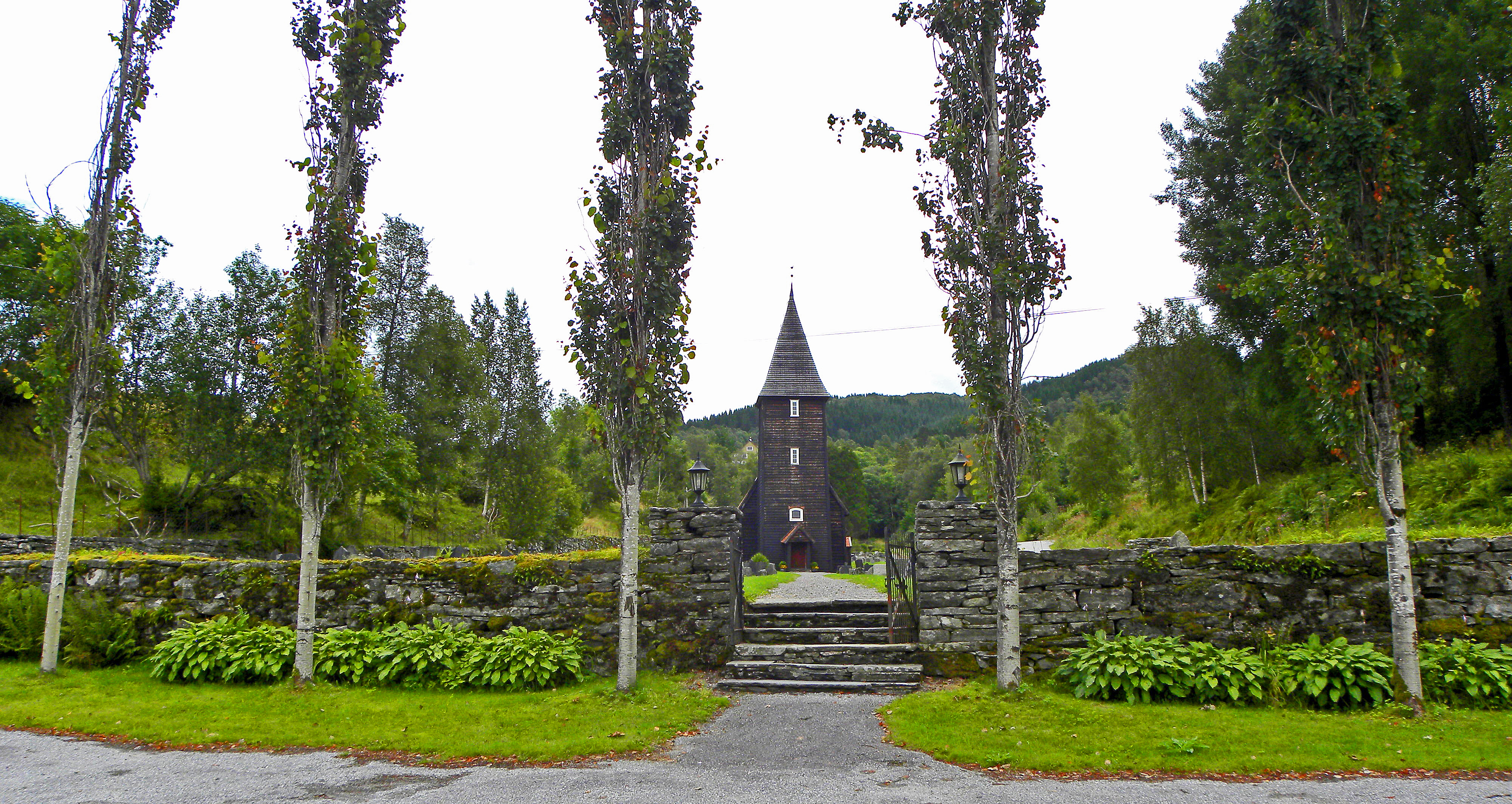

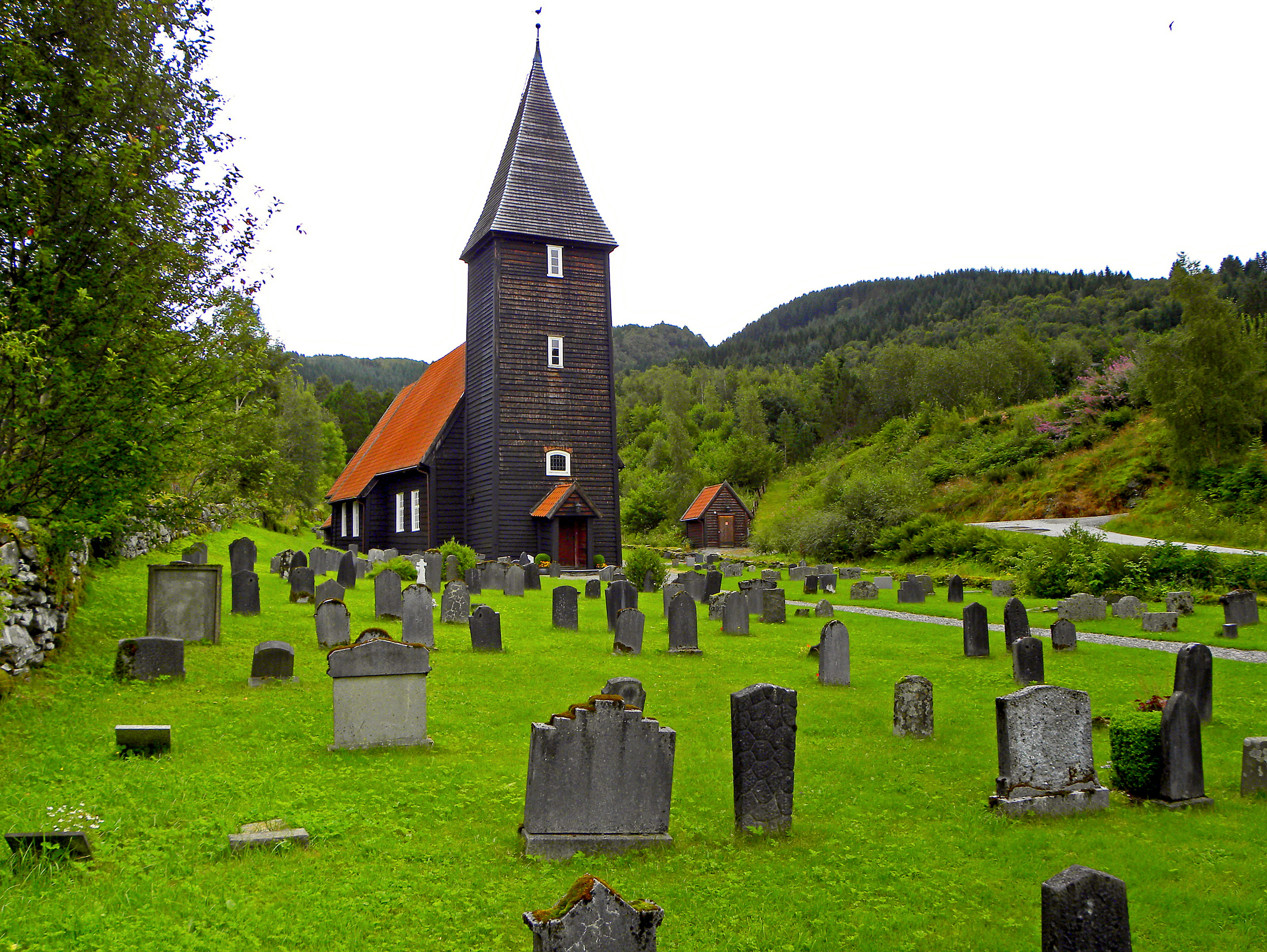

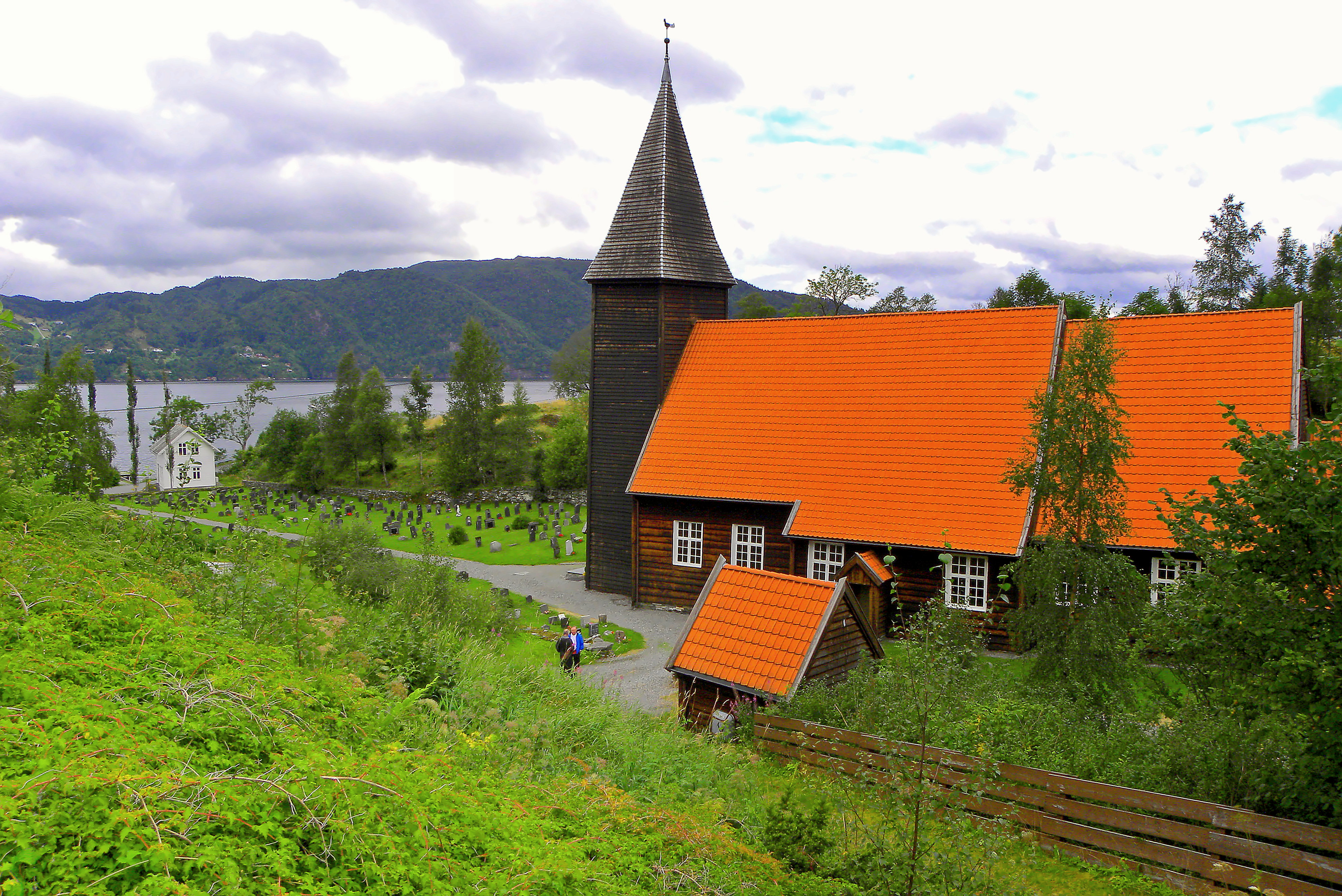

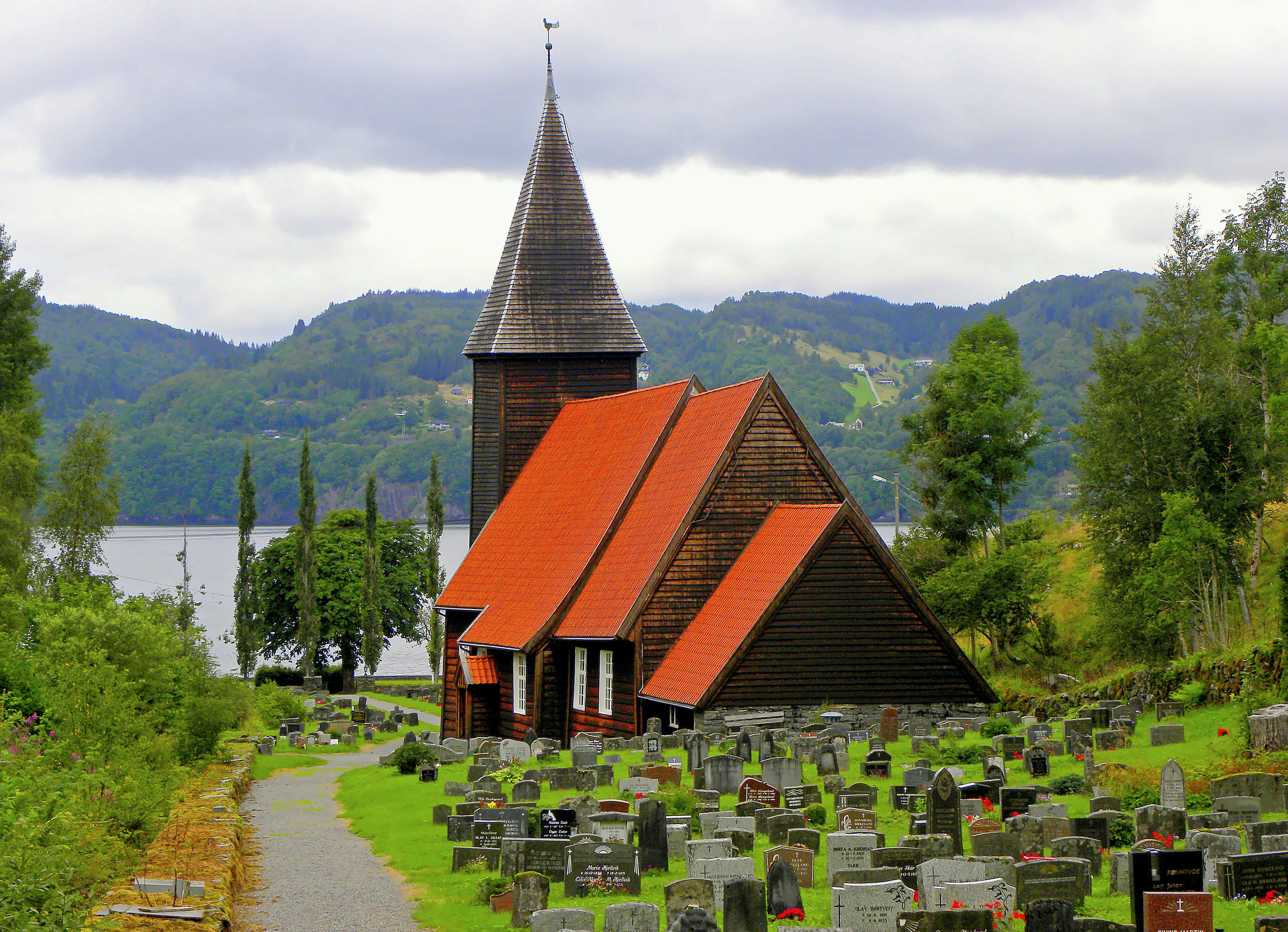

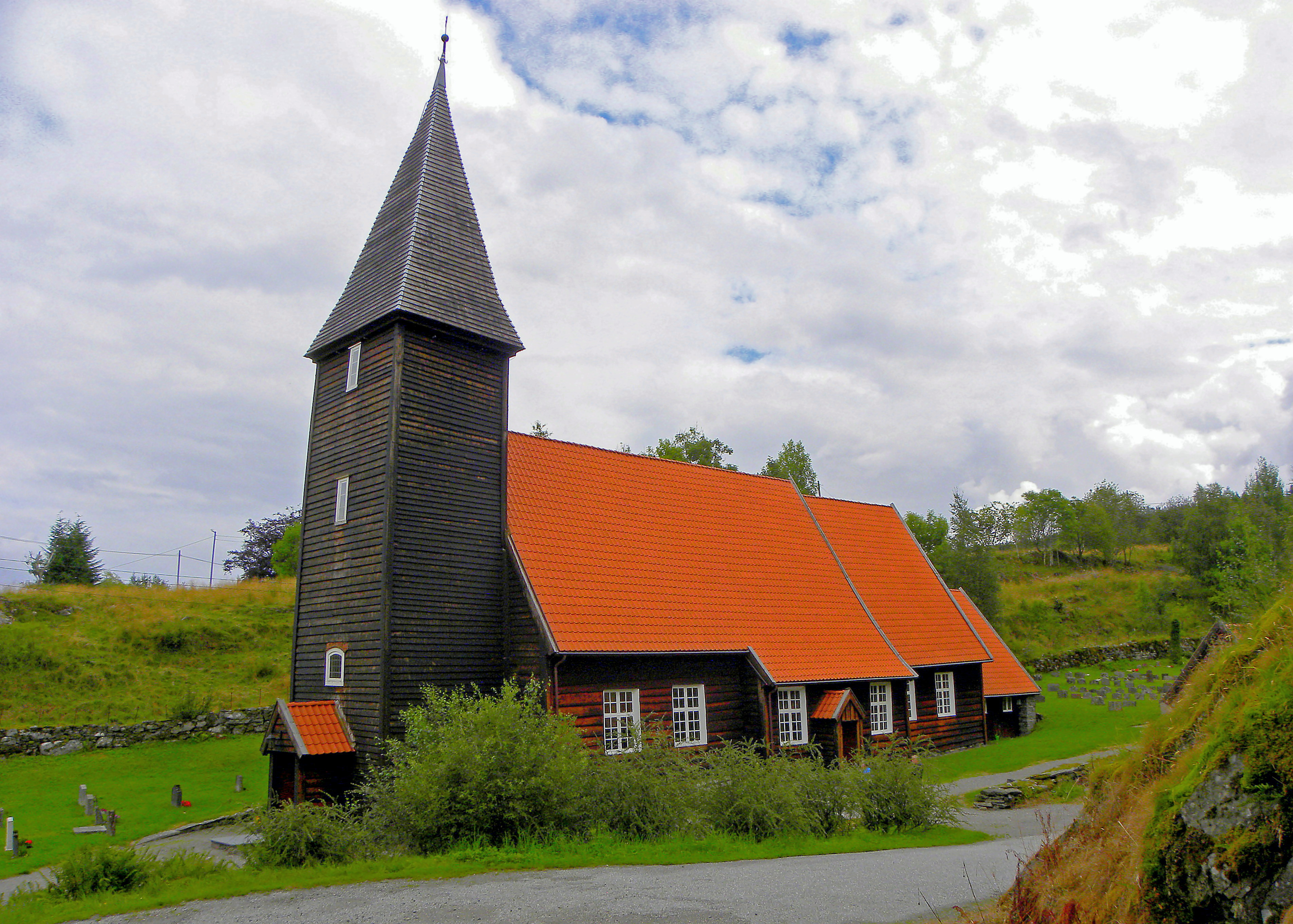

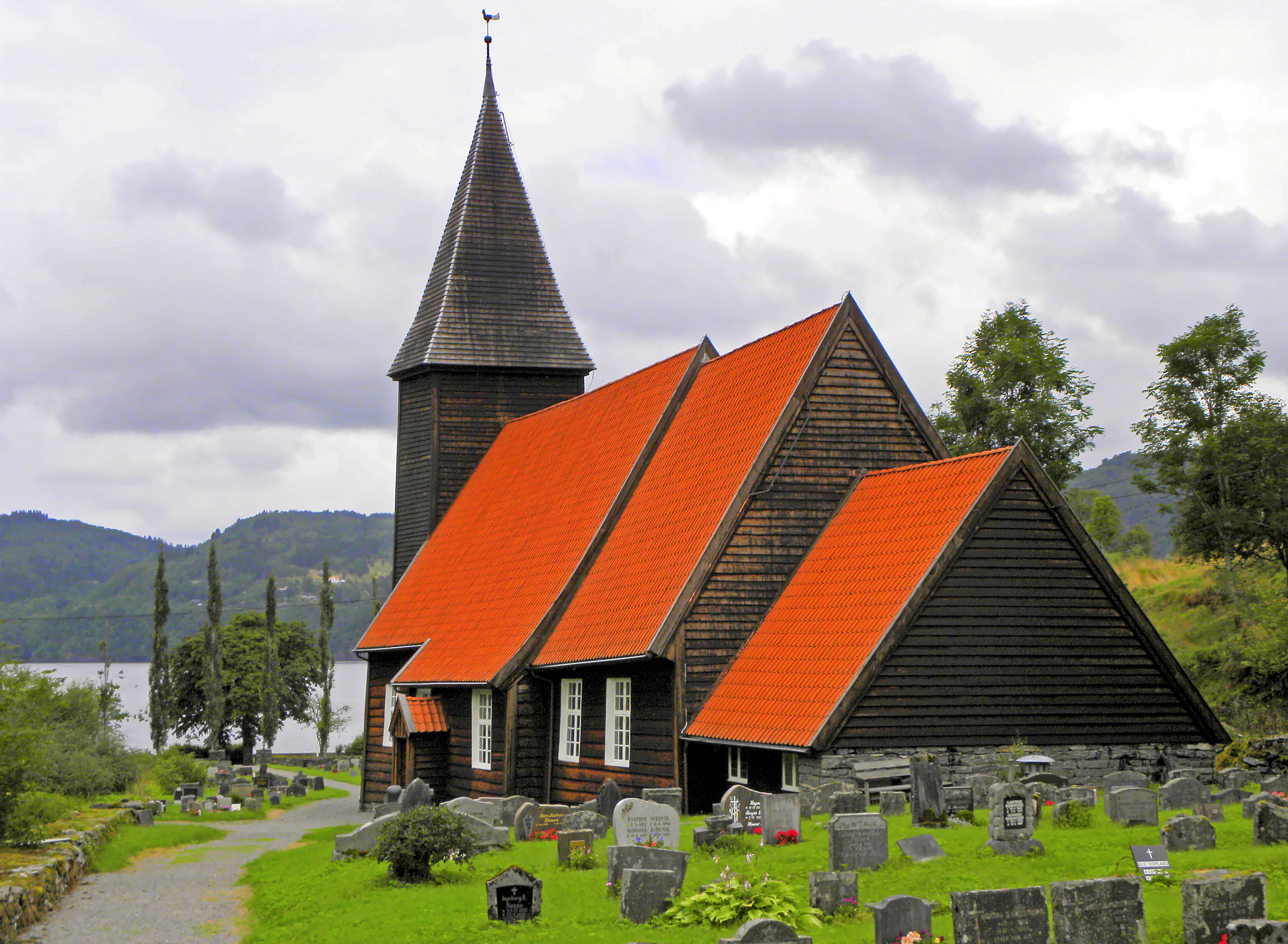

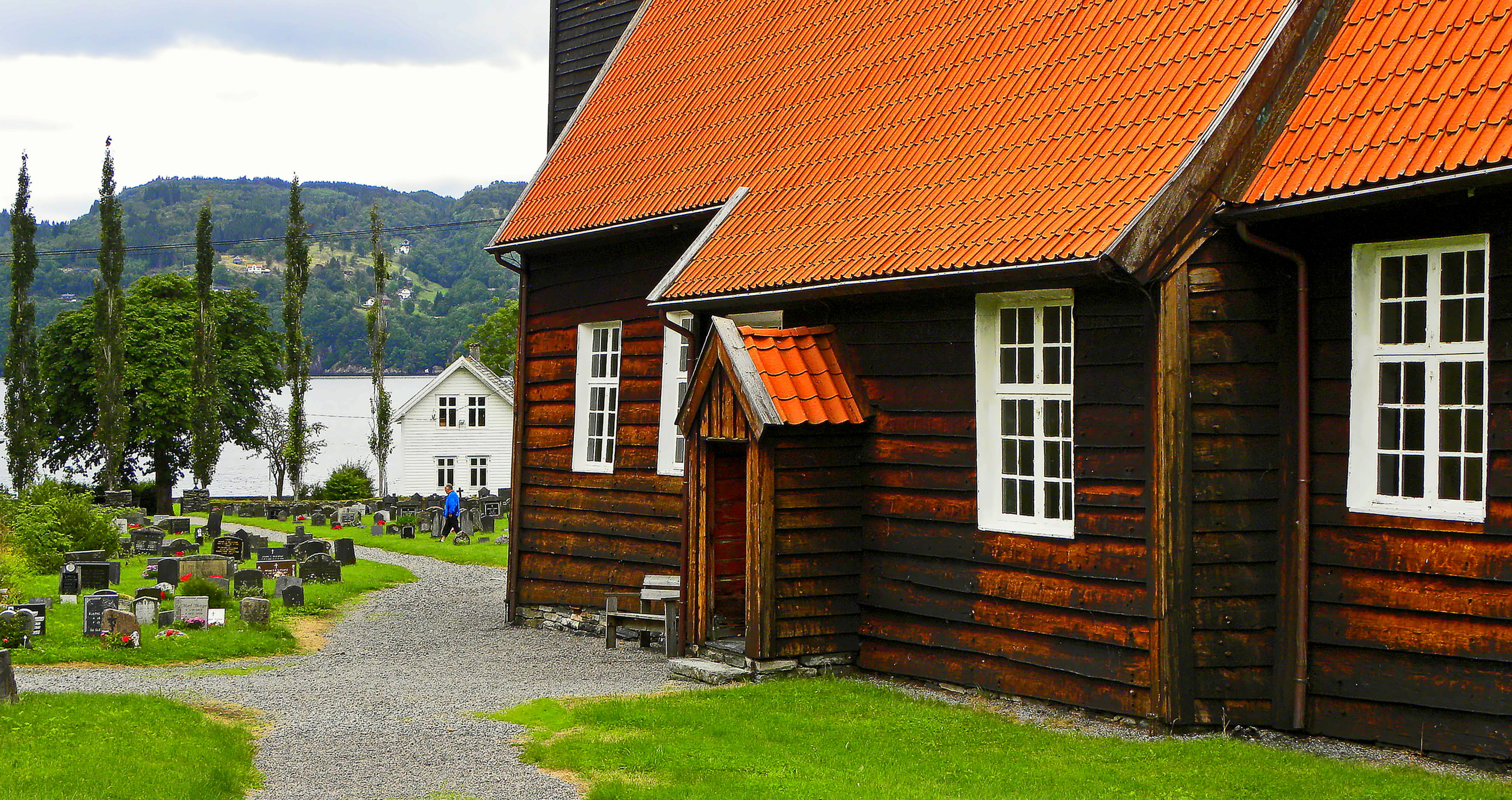

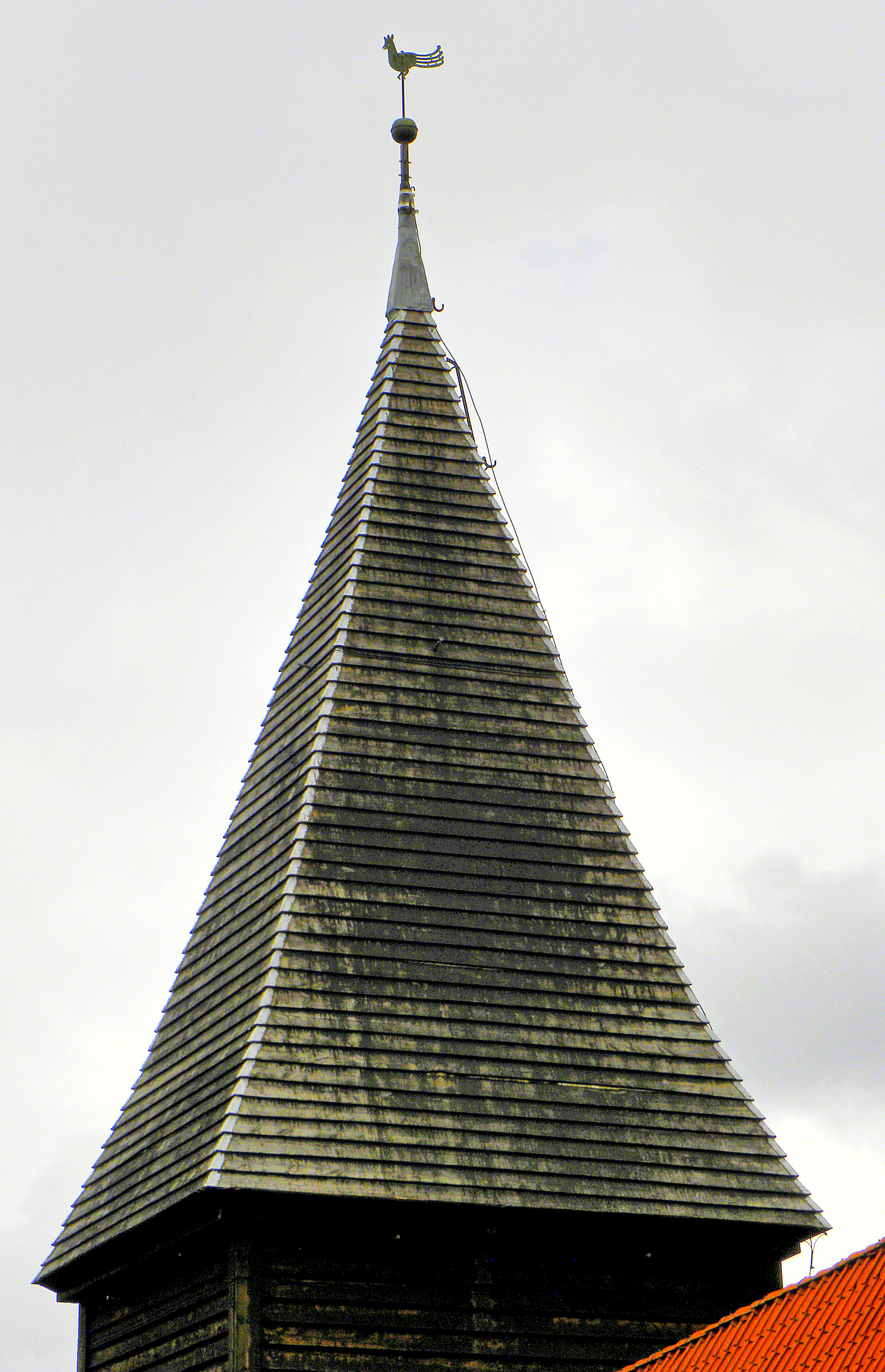

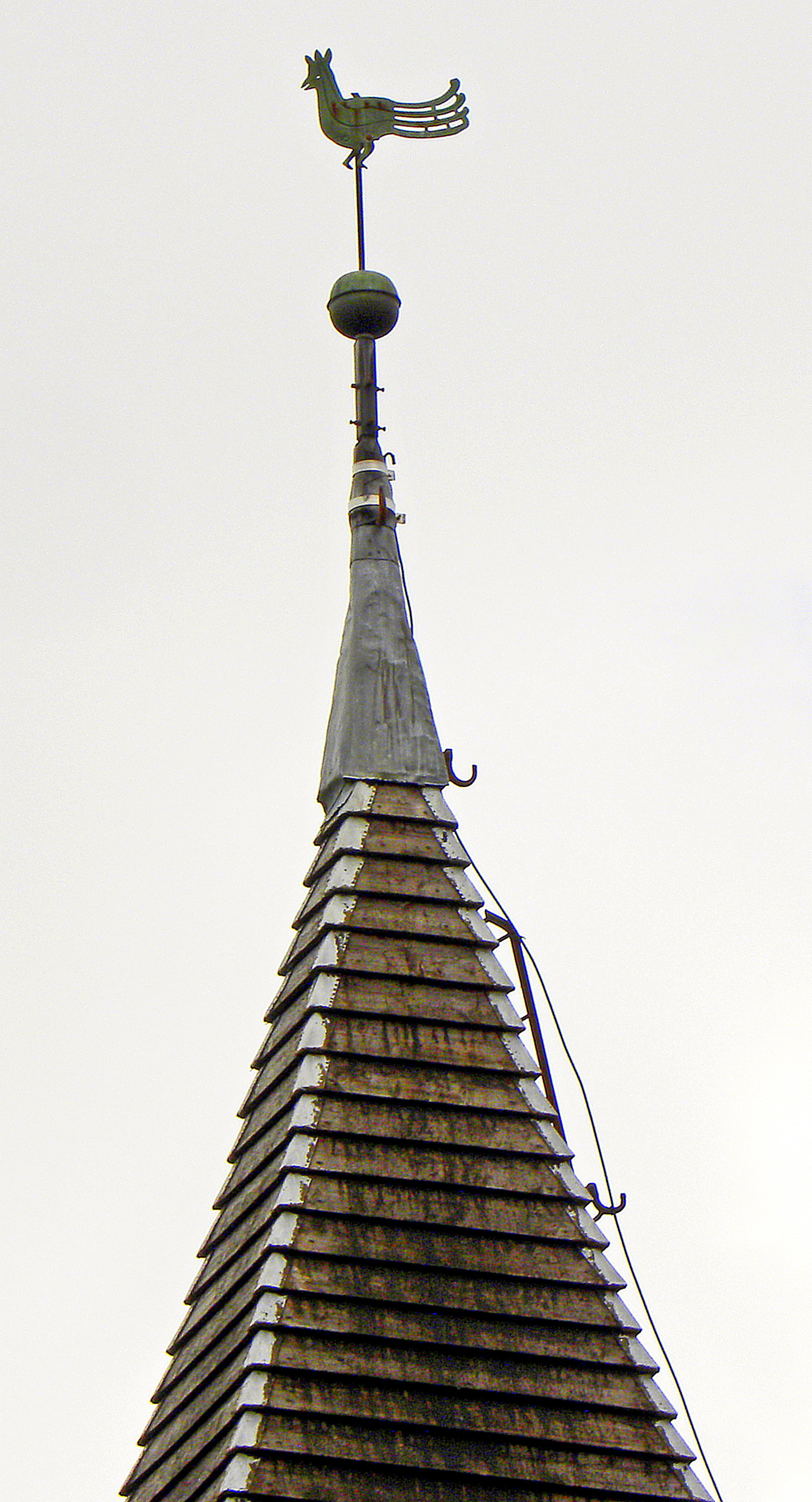

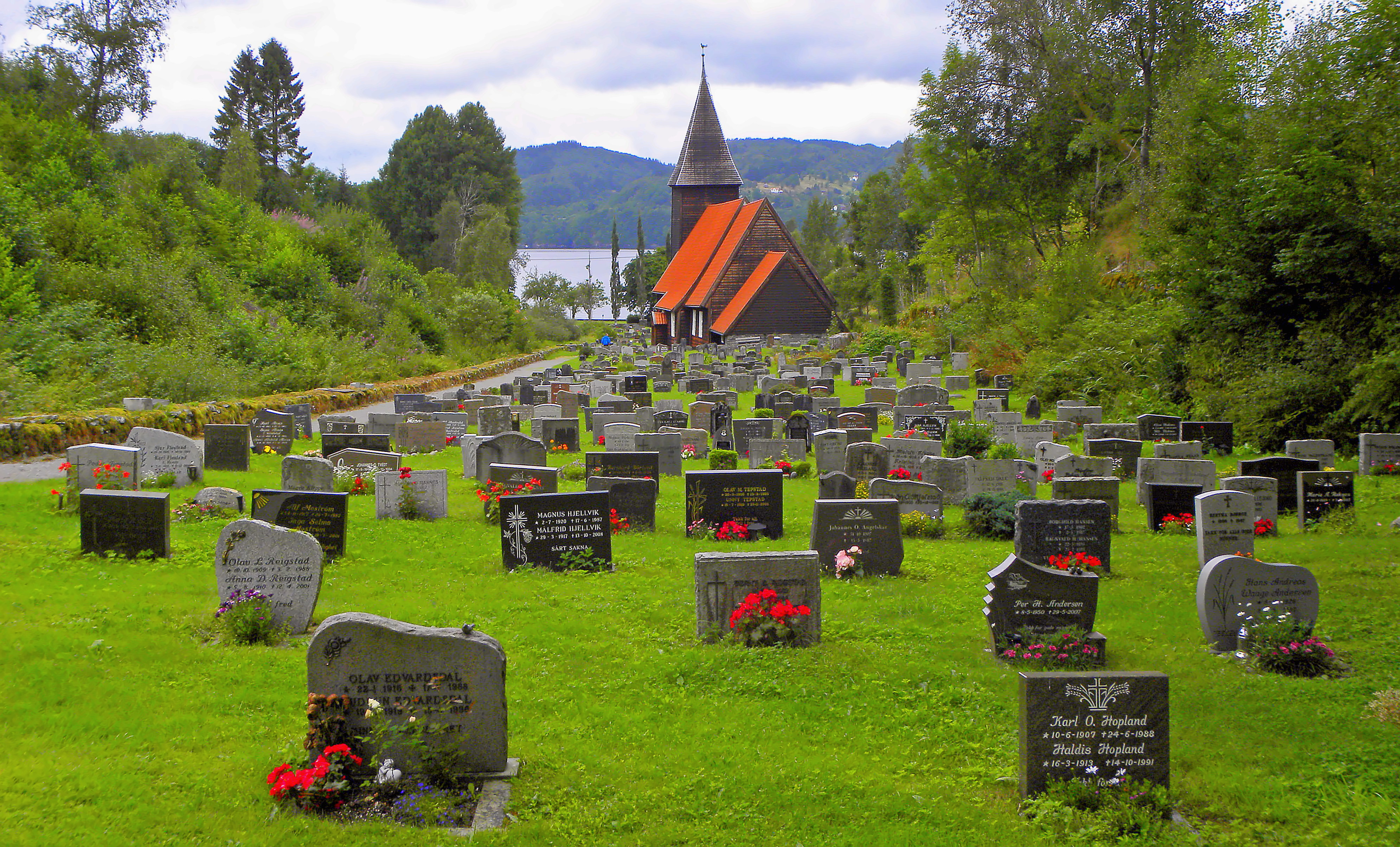

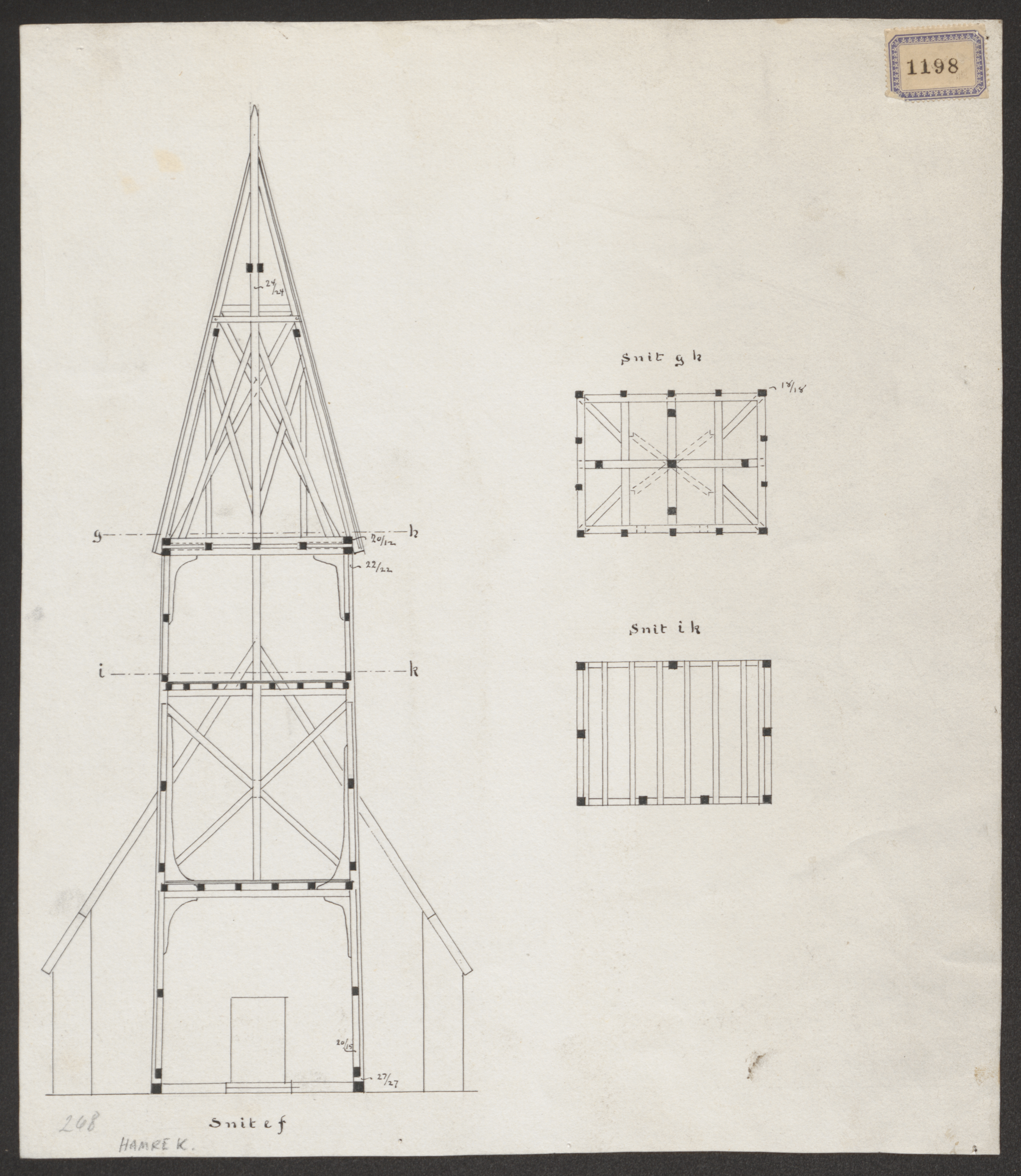

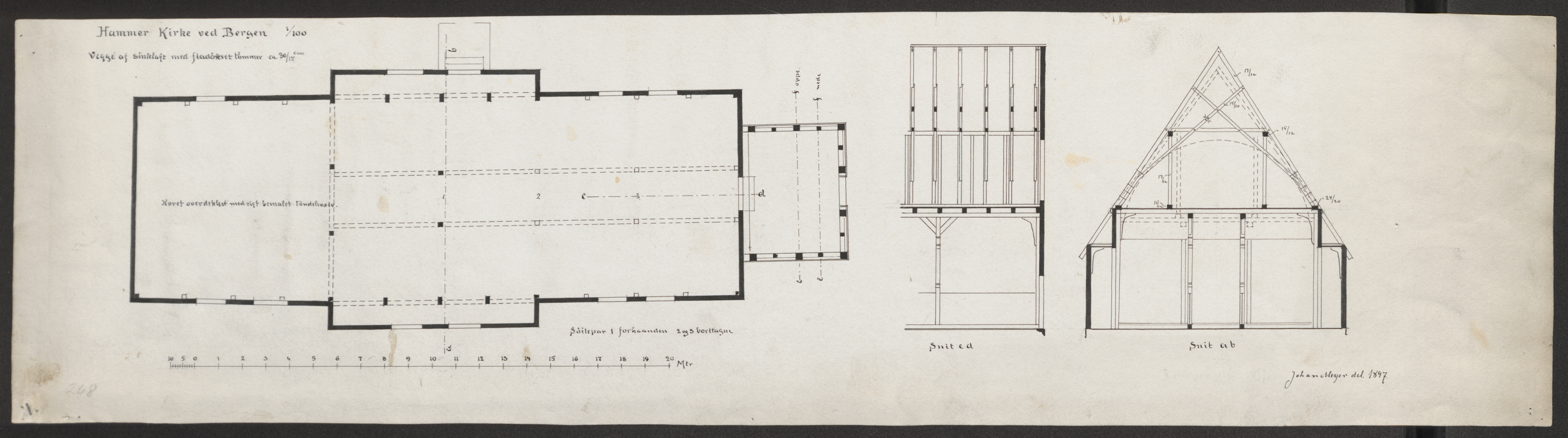

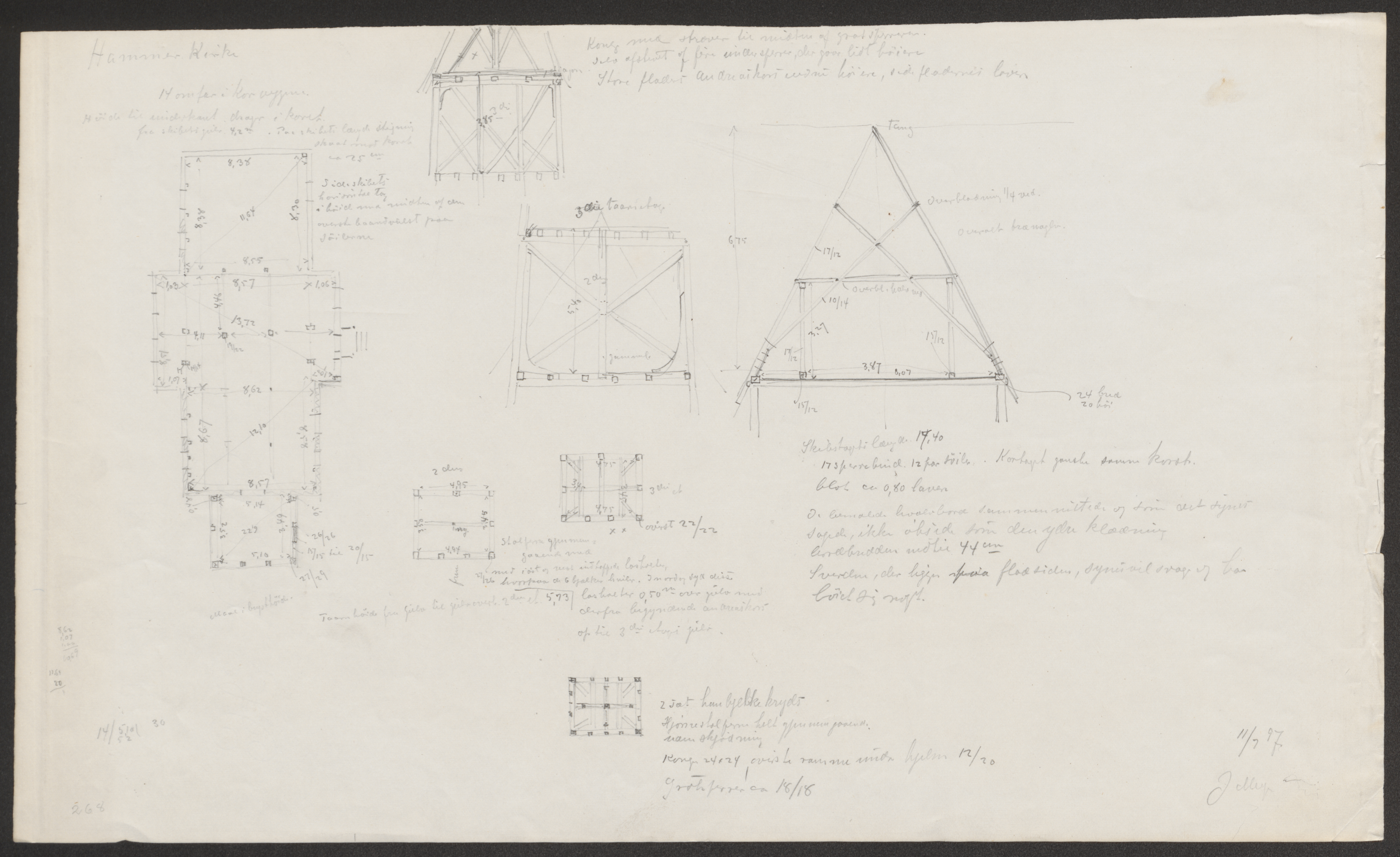

== See also ==
- List of churches in Bjørgvin
