= Hamre, Osterøy =

Village in Osterøy Municipality, Norway

Hamre
- Village
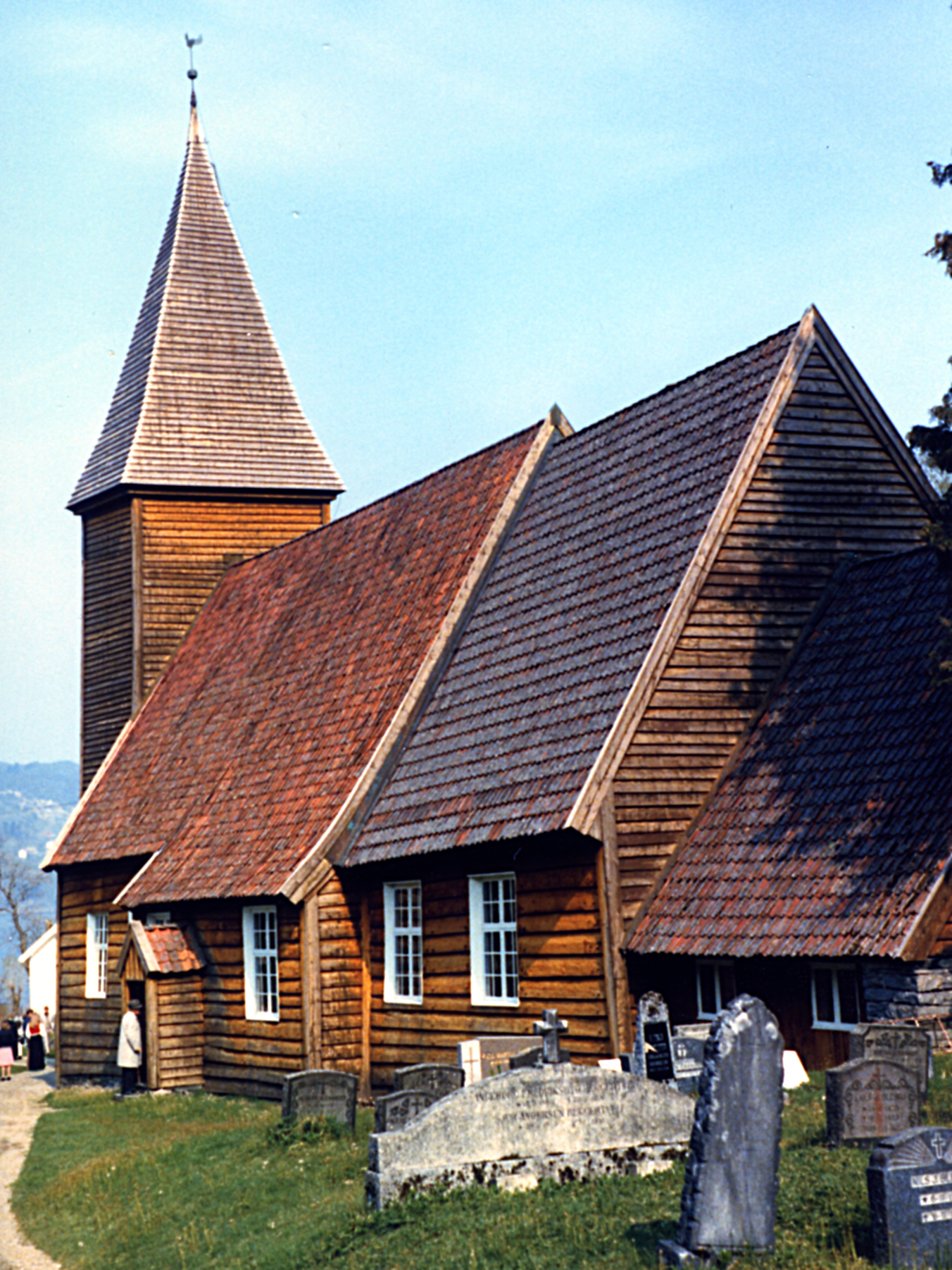
- View of the local church
- Interactive map of Hamre
- Coordinates: 60.54662°N 5.35852°E
- Country: Norway
- Region: Western Norway
- County: Vestland
- District: Nordhordland
- Municipality: Osterøy Municipality

Area
  - Total: 0.21 km^{2} (0.081 sq mi)
- Elevation: 17 m (56 ft)

Population (2025)
  - Total: 216
  - Density: 1,029/km^{2} (2,670/sq mi)
- Time zone: UTC+01:00 (CET)
  - Summer (DST): UTC+02:00 (CEST)
- Post Code: 5281 Valestrandsfossen

Hamre is a village in Osterøy Municipality in Vestland county, Norway. The village of Hamre is located near the extreme western point on the island of Osterøy, across the Osterfjorden from the village of Knarvik. Hamre sits about 7 kilometres (4.3 mi) north of the village of Valestrandsfossen.

The 0.21-square-kilometre (52-acre) village has a population (2025) of 216 and a population density of 1,029 inhabitants per square kilometre (2,670/sq mi).

== History ==
Findings from the Stone Age suggest that people have been living in Hamre and the surrounding area for more than 3,500 years.

Hamre Church was built in the village in 1622. An inscription on the old main entrance states the church could be dated back to 1585. There had previously been a stave church at this site dating from about the year 1024. The stave church was demolished when the present church was built. The church was partially rebuilt in 1859 and restored in 1945 and 1949. There is the baptismal font made of soapstone, which is dated from around the year 1250.

The village of Hamre was the administrative centre of the old Hamre Municipality, which existed from 1838 until 1964.
