= Osterøy Municipality =

Municipality in Vestland, Norway

Osterøy Municipality Osterøy kommune
- Municipality
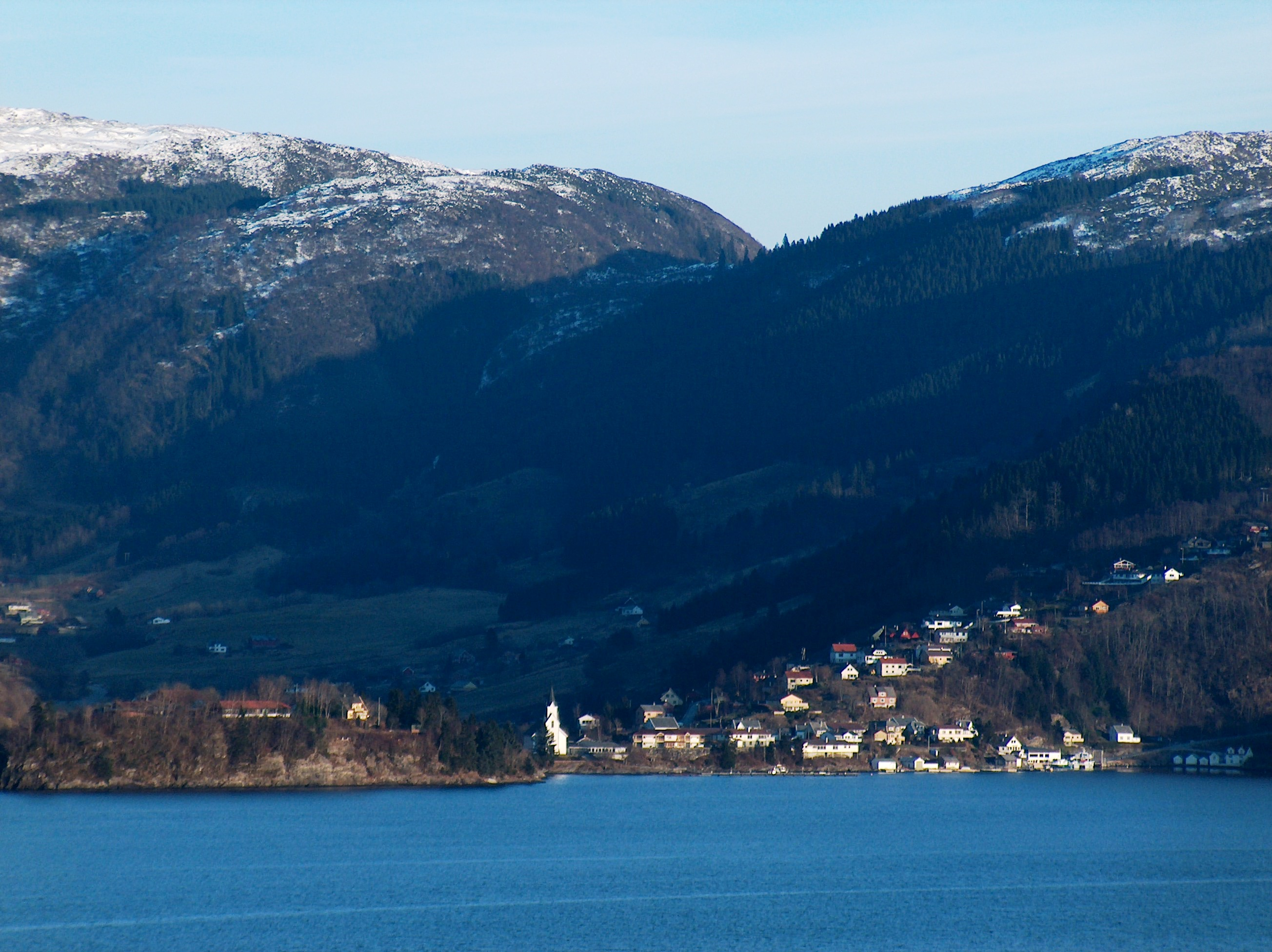
- View of the village of Haus

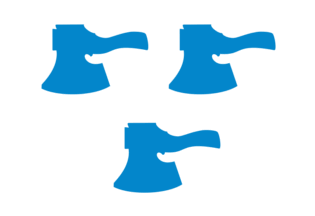
- Flag Coat of arms

- Vestland within Norway

- Osterøy within Vestland
- Coordinates: 60°31′05″N 05°32′29″E
- Country: Norway
- County: Vestland
- District: Nordhordland
- Established: 1 Jan 1964
  - Preceded by: Hamre, Hosanger, Haus, and part of Bruvik
- Administrative centre: Lonevåg

Government
  - Mayor (2019): Lars Fjeldstad (Sp)

Area
  - Total: 255.11 km^{2} (98.50 sq mi)
  - Land: 243.70 km^{2} (94.09 sq mi)
  - Water: 11.41 km^{2} (4.41 sq mi) 4.5%
  - Rank: #285 in Norway
- Highest elevation: 868.14 m (2,848.2 ft)

Population (2025)
  - Total: 8,172
  - Rank: #131 in Norway
  - Density: 32/km^{2} (83/sq mi)
  - Change (10 years): ▲ +5.3%
- Demonym: Ostring

Official language
  - Norwegian form: Nynorsk
- Time zone: UTC+01:00 (CET)
  - Summer (DST): UTC+02:00 (CEST)
- ISO 3166 code: NO-4630
- Website: Official website

Osterøy is an island municipality in Vestland county, Norway. It is located in the traditional district of Nordhordland. The municipality encompasses most of the island of Osterøy. The administrative centre of Osterøy is the village of Lonevåg in the central part of the island. The largest settlement is the village of Valestrandfossen with 1,380 inhabitants as of 1 January 2025.

Osterøy municipality and Vaksdal Municipality are both located on the island of Osterøy. Osterøy municipality covers most of the island with the mostly uninhabited northeastern part of the island belonging to Vaksdal Municipality. Osterøy is located a short distance northeast of the city of Bergen. It is surrounded by the Osterfjorden, Sørfjorden, and Veafjorden. The 19th-century musician and composer Ole Bull had a summer home in Valestrandfossen in Osterøy. The historic Havrå farm is a cluster farm which represents the traditional way of living for farmers. Havrå is located on the southeastern part of the municipality.

The 255.11-square-kilometre (98.50 sq mi) municipality is the 285th largest by area out of the 357 municipalities in Norway. Osterøy Municipality is the 131st most populous municipality in Norway with a population of 8,172. The municipality's population density is 32 inhabitants per square kilometre (83/sq mi) and its population has increased by 5.3% over the previous 10-year period.

== Geography ==
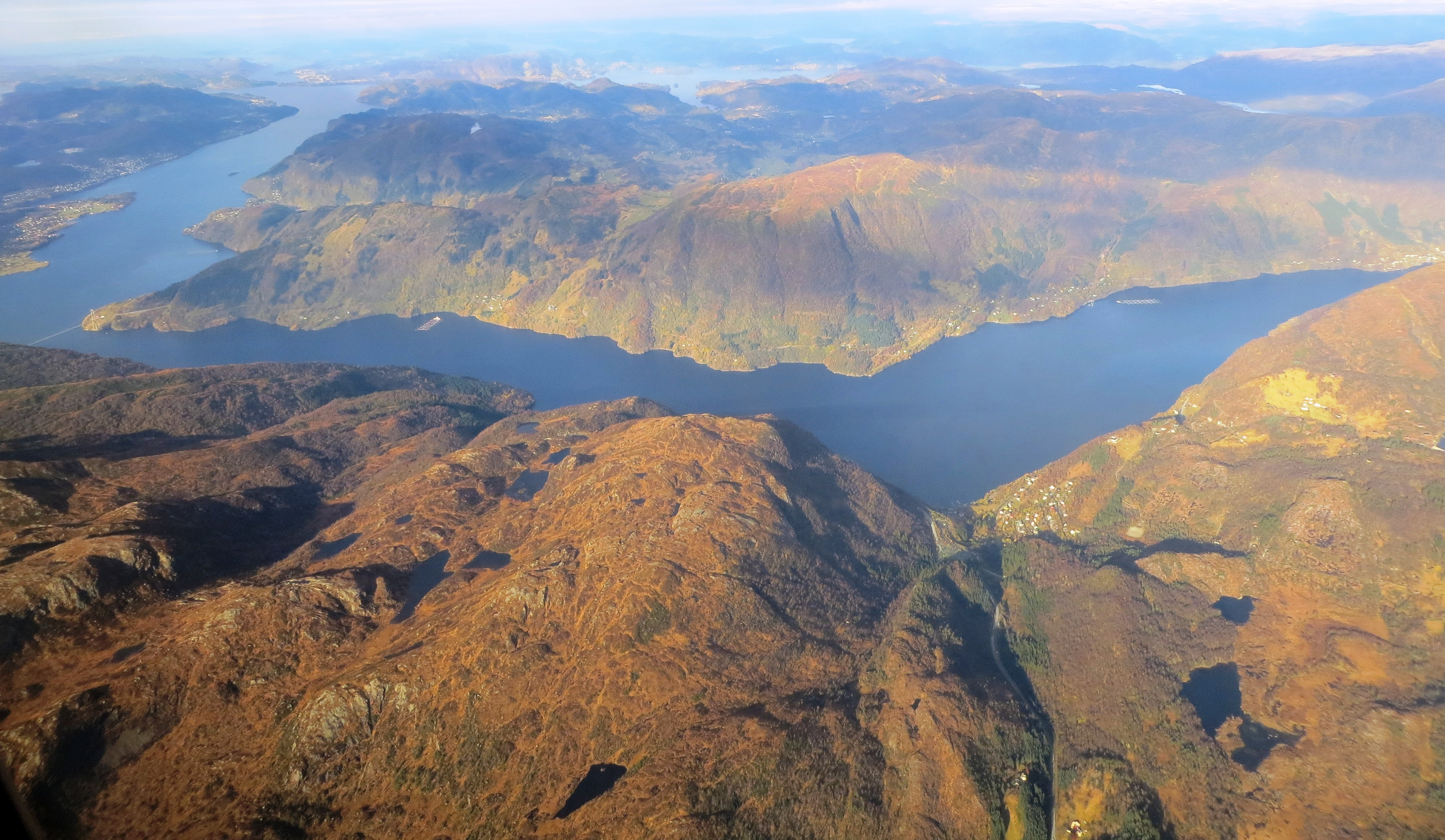
Osterøy island, located above the fjord in the picture

The municipality sits on the island of Osterøy, encompassing most of the island. The island is surrounded by several fjords: Osterfjorden-Romarheimsfjorden, Sørfjorden, and Veafjorden. The highest mountain in the municipality is the 868-metre (2,848 ft) tall Høgafjellet on the border with Vaksdal Municipality. The Lonevågen fjord cuts in the center of the island, with the village of Lonevåg sitting at the end of the fjord. Alver Municipality is located to the north, Vaksdal Municipality is located to the east, and Bergen Municipality is located to the south and west.

=== Settlements ===
Osterøy Municipality contains six "urban settlements", as defined by Statistics Norway (with populations listed from 1 January 2025): Valestrandfossen (1,380 inhabitants), Lonevåg (975 inhabitants), Hausvik (583 inhabitants), Haugo (844 inhabitants), Fotlandsvåg (277 inhabitants), and Hamre (216 inhabitants). Other rural settlements in Osterøy include Austbygdi, Bruvik, Gjerstad, and Hosanger.

== History ==
The municipality of Osterøy was created on 1 January 1964 as part of a major municipal merger that was proposed by the Schei Committee. Osterøy was created from parts of four different municipalities that were all dissolved in the merger. The following areas were merged to form the new municipality of Osterøy:

- the parts of Haus Municipality that were located on Osterøy island (population: 2,327)
- the Bruvikbygda area of Bruvik Municipality that was located on Osterøy island (population: 409)
- the parts of Hosanger Municipality that were located on Osterøy island (population: 1,616)
- the parts of Hamre Municipality that were located on Osterøy island (population: 1,166)

Historically, this municipality was part of the old Hordaland county. On 1 January 2020, the municipality became a part of the newly-formed Vestland county (after Hordaland and Sogn og Fjordane counties were merged).

=== Name ===
The municipality is named after the island of Osterøy (Old Norse: Ostr) since the municipality encompassed most of the island. The first element of the name has an uncertain meaning. It is possible that it comes from the word óstr which means "east". Another interpretation is that it is derived from the word auka which means "increase" or "surpass", thus it could be referring to the large size of the island. The last element, øy, was added later, but that word comes from the Old Norse word ey which means "island".

== Culture ==
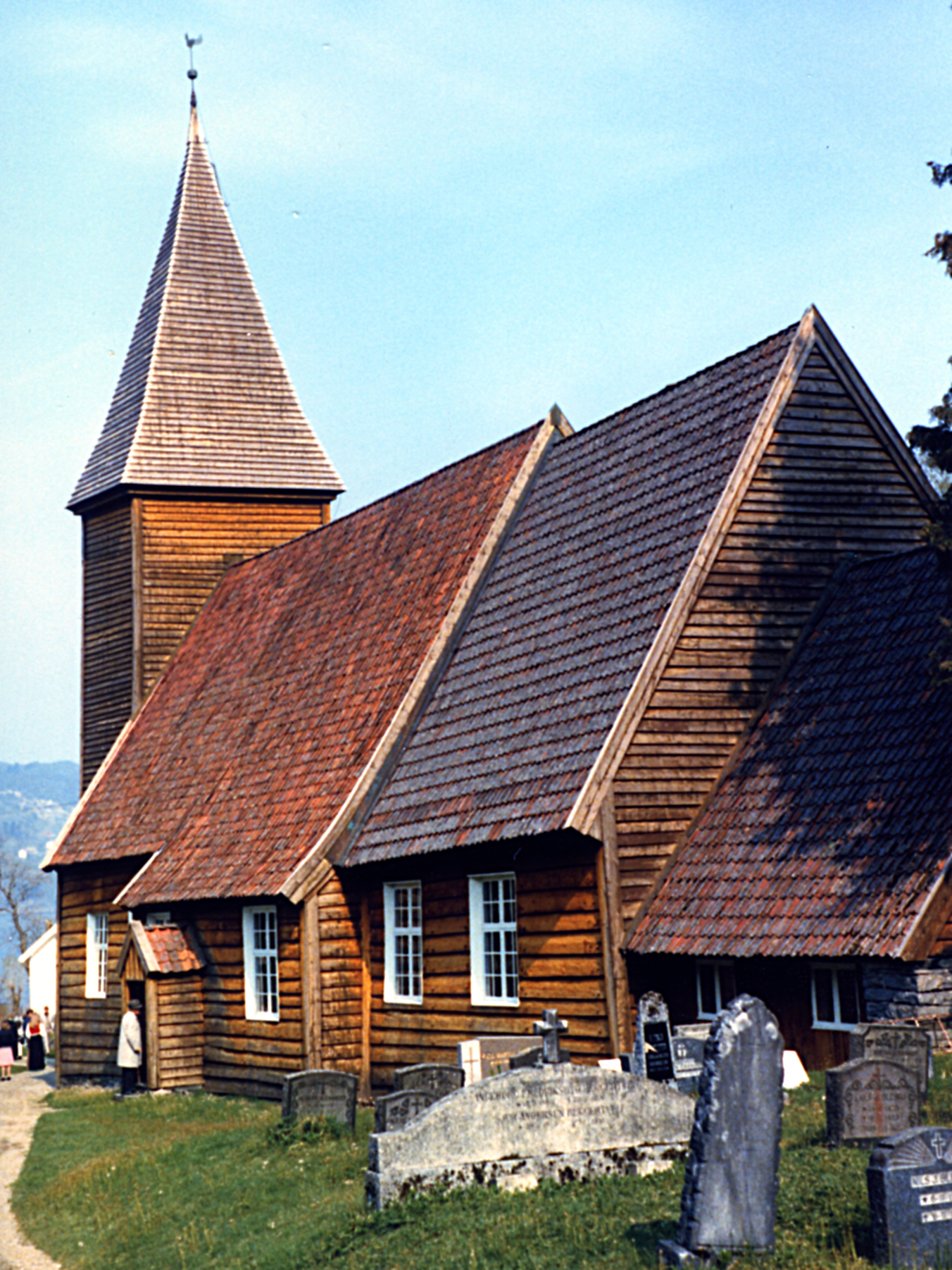
View of the church at Hamre, dating back to 1622

=== Coat of arms ===
The coat of arms was granted on 20 December 1985. The official blazon is "Argent, three axes fesswise azure blades to the base, 2-1" (Norwegian: I sølv tre blå økser med blada ned, 2-1). This means the arms have a field (background) has a tincture of argent which means it is commonly colored white, but if it is made out of metal, then silver is used. The charge is a set of three broad axes laying horizontally with their blades facing down, with two axes at the top and one beneath. Broad axes were historically used in the construction of timber houses, which has long traditions in the municipality. Building craftsmen from Osterøy have been known for their solid work throughout the county. The designer was Egil Korsnes who based his design on the idea of Magnus Hardeland. The municipal flag has the same design as the coat of arms.

=== Churches ===
The Church of Norway has five parishes (sokn) within Osterøy Municipality. It is part of the Åsane prosti (deanery) in the Diocese of Bjørgvin.

Churches in Osterøy Municipality
Parish (sokn)	Church name	Location of the church	Year built
Bruvik	Bruvik Church	Bruvik	1867
Gjerstad	Gjerstad Church	Gjerstad	1870
Hamre	Hamre Church	Hamre	1622
Haus	Haus Church	Haus	1874
Hosanger	Hosanger Church	Hosanger	1796

== Government ==
Osterøy Municipality is responsible for primary education (through 10th grade), outpatient health services, senior citizen services, welfare and other social services, zoning, economic development, and municipal roads and utilities. The municipality is governed by a municipal council of directly elected representatives. The mayor is indirectly elected by a vote of the municipal council. The municipality is under the jurisdiction of the Hordaland District Court and the Gulating Court of Appeal.

=== Municipal council ===
The municipal council (Kommunestyre) of Osterøy Municipality is made up of 27 representatives that are elected to four-year terms. The tables below show the current and historical composition of the council by political party.

Osterøy kommunestyre 2023–2027
Party name (in Nynorsk)	Number of representatives
Labour Party (Arbeidarpartiet)	4
Progress Party (Framstegspartiet)	6
Conservative Party (Høgre)	4
Industry and Business Party (Industri‑ og Næringspartiet)	2
Christian Democratic Party (Kristeleg Folkeparti)	2
Centre Party (Senterpartiet)	7
Socialist Left Party (Sosialistisk Venstreparti)	1
Liberal Party (Venstre)	1
Total number of members:	27

Osterøy kommunestyre 2019–2023
Party name (in Nynorsk)	Number of representatives
Labour Party (Arbeidarpartiet)	4
Progress Party (Framstegspartiet)	7
Green Party (Miljøpartiet Dei Grøne)	1
Conservative Party (Høgre)	4
Christian Democratic Party (Kristeleg Folkeparti)	3
Centre Party (Senterpartiet)	5
Socialist Left Party (Sosialistisk Venstreparti)	2
Liberal Party (Venstre)	1
Total number of members:	27

Osterøy kommunestyre 2015–2019
Party name (in Nynorsk)	Number of representatives
Labour Party (Arbeidarpartiet)	8
Progress Party (Framstegspartiet)	6
Green Party (Miljøpartiet Dei Grøne)	2
Conservative Party (Høgre)	4
Christian Democratic Party (Kristeleg Folkeparti)	4
Centre Party (Senterpartiet)	2
Liberal Party (Venstre)	1
Total number of members:	27

Osterøy kommunestyre 2011–2015
Party name (in Nynorsk)	Number of representatives
Labour Party (Arbeidarpartiet)	10
Progress Party (Framstegspartiet)	5
Conservative Party (Høgre)	6
Christian Democratic Party (Kristeleg Folkeparti)	2
Centre Party (Senterpartiet)	3
Liberal Party (Venstre)	1
Total number of members:	27

Osterøy kommunestyre 2007–2011
Party name (in Nynorsk)	Number of representatives
Labour Party (Arbeidarpartiet)	8
Progress Party (Framstegspartiet)	9
Conservative Party (Høgre)	4
Christian Democratic Party (Kristeleg Folkeparti)	2
Centre Party (Senterpartiet)	2
Socialist Left Party (Sosialistisk Venstreparti)	1
Liberal Party (Venstre)	1
Total number of members:	27

Osterøy kommunestyre 2003–2007
Party name (in Nynorsk)	Number of representatives
Labour Party (Arbeidarpartiet)	8
Progress Party (Framstegspartiet)	4
Conservative Party (Høgre)	5
Christian Democratic Party (Kristeleg Folkeparti)	2
Centre Party (Senterpartiet)	3
Socialist Left Party (Sosialistisk Venstreparti)	2
Liberal Party (Venstre)	1
Cross-Party Common List (Tverrpolitisk Samlingsliste)	2
Total number of members:	27

Osterøy kommunestyre 1999–2003
Party name (in Nynorsk)	Number of representatives
Labour Party (Arbeidarpartiet)	10
Progress Party (Framstegspartiet)	2
Conservative Party (Høgre)	4
Christian Democratic Party (Kristeleg Folkeparti)	5
Centre Party (Senterpartiet)	2
Socialist Left Party (Sosialistisk Venstreparti)	2
Liberal Party (Venstre)	2
Cross-Party Common List (Tverrpolitisk Samlingsliste)	9
Osterøy Youth List (Osterøy ungdomsliste)	1
Total number of members:	35

Osterøy kommunestyre 1995–1999
Party name (in Nynorsk)	Number of representatives
Labour Party (Arbeidarpartiet)	9
Conservative Party (Høgre)	4
Christian Democratic Party (Kristeleg Folkeparti)	4
Centre Party (Senterpartiet)	6
Socialist Left Party (Sosialistisk Venstreparti)	1
Liberal Party (Venstre)	2
Cross-Party Common List (Tverrpolitisk Samlingsliste)	9
Total number of members:	35

Osterøy kommunestyre 1991–1995
Party name (in Nynorsk)	Number of representatives
Labour Party (Arbeidarpartiet)	8
Progress Party (Framstegspartiet)	1
Conservative Party (Høgre)	3
Christian Democratic Party (Kristeleg Folkeparti)	4
Centre Party (Senterpartiet)	6
Socialist Left Party (Sosialistisk Venstreparti)	2
Liberal Party (Venstre)	1
Cross-Party Common List (Tverrpolitisk Samlingsliste)	10
Total number of members:	35

Osterøy kommunestyre 1987–1991
Party name (in Nynorsk)	Number of representatives
Labour Party (Arbeidarpartiet)	11
Progress Party (Framstegspartiet)	2
Conservative Party (Høgre)	5
Christian Democratic Party (Kristeleg Folkeparti)	3
Centre Party (Senterpartiet)	5
Liberal Party (Venstre)	1
Cross-Party Common List (Tverrpolitisk Samlingsliste)	8
Total number of members:	35

Osterøy kommunestyre 1983–1987
Party name (in Nynorsk)	Number of representatives
Labour Party (Arbeidarpartiet)	12
Progress Party (Framstegspartiet)	3
Conservative Party (Høgre)	5
Christian Democratic Party (Kristeleg Folkeparti)	5
Centre Party (Senterpartiet)	7
Liberal Party (Venstre)	3
Total number of members:	35

Osterøy kommunestyre 1979–1983
Party name (in Nynorsk)	Number of representatives
Labour Party (Arbeidarpartiet)	9
Conservative Party (Høgre)	7
Christian Democratic Party (Kristeleg Folkeparti)	5
New People's Party (Nye Folkepartiet)	2
Centre Party (Senterpartiet)	8
Socialist Left Party (Sosialistisk Venstreparti)	1
Liberal Party (Venstre)	3
Total number of members:	35

Osterøy kommunestyre 1975–1979
Party name (in Nynorsk)	Number of representatives
Labour Party (Arbeidarpartiet)	11
Conservative Party (Høgre)	4
Christian Democratic Party (Kristeleg Folkeparti)	7
New People's Party (Nye Folkepartiet)	2
Centre Party (Senterpartiet)	9
Socialist Left Party (Sosialistisk Venstreparti)	1
Liberal Party (Venstre)	1
Total number of members:	35

Osterøy kommunestyre 1971–1975
Party name (in Nynorsk)	Number of representatives
Labour Party (Arbeidarpartiet)	12
Conservative Party (Høgre)	3
Christian Democratic Party (Kristeleg Folkeparti)	5
Centre Party (Senterpartiet)	9
Socialist People's Party (Sosialistisk Folkeparti)	1
Liberal Party (Venstre)	5
Total number of members:	35

Osterøy kommunestyre 1967–1971
Party name (in Nynorsk)	Number of representatives
Labour Party (Arbeidarpartiet)	13
Conservative Party (Høgre)	3
Christian Democratic Party (Kristeleg Folkeparti)	5
Centre Party (Senterpartiet)	8
Socialist People's Party (Sosialistisk Folkeparti)	1
Liberal Party (Venstre)	5
Total number of members:	35

Osterøy kommunestyre 1964–1967
Party name (in Nynorsk)	Number of representatives
Labour Party (Arbeidarpartiet)	13
Conservative Party (Høgre)	3
Christian Democratic Party (Kristeleg Folkeparti)	5
Centre Party (Senterpartiet)	8
Socialist People's Party (Sosialistisk Folkeparti)	1
Liberal Party (Venstre)	5
Total number of members:	35
Note: On 1 January 1964, Osterøy Municipality was created from parts of Bruvik Municipality, Hamre Municipality, Haus Municipality, and Hosanger Municipality.

=== Mayors ===
The mayor (Nynorsk: ordførar) of Osterøy Municipality is the political leader of the municipality and the chairperson of the municipal council. Here is a list of people who have held this position:

- 1964–1967: Gerhard Bøe (Sp)
- 1967–1971: Mons R. Mjelde (Sp)
- 1971–1975: Gerhard Bøe (Sp)
- 1975–1979: Sigvald Hauge (Ap)
- 1979–1983: Jon Hanstveit (KrF)
- 1983–1987: Ingunn Rongved (Sp)
- 1987–1999: Erling Raknes (Ap)
- 1999–2003: Ove Arne Kleiveland (LL)
- 2003–2015: Kari Foseid Aakre (Ap)
- 2015–2019: Jarle Skeidsvoll (KrF)
- 2019–present: Lars Fjeldstad (Sp)

== Transport ==
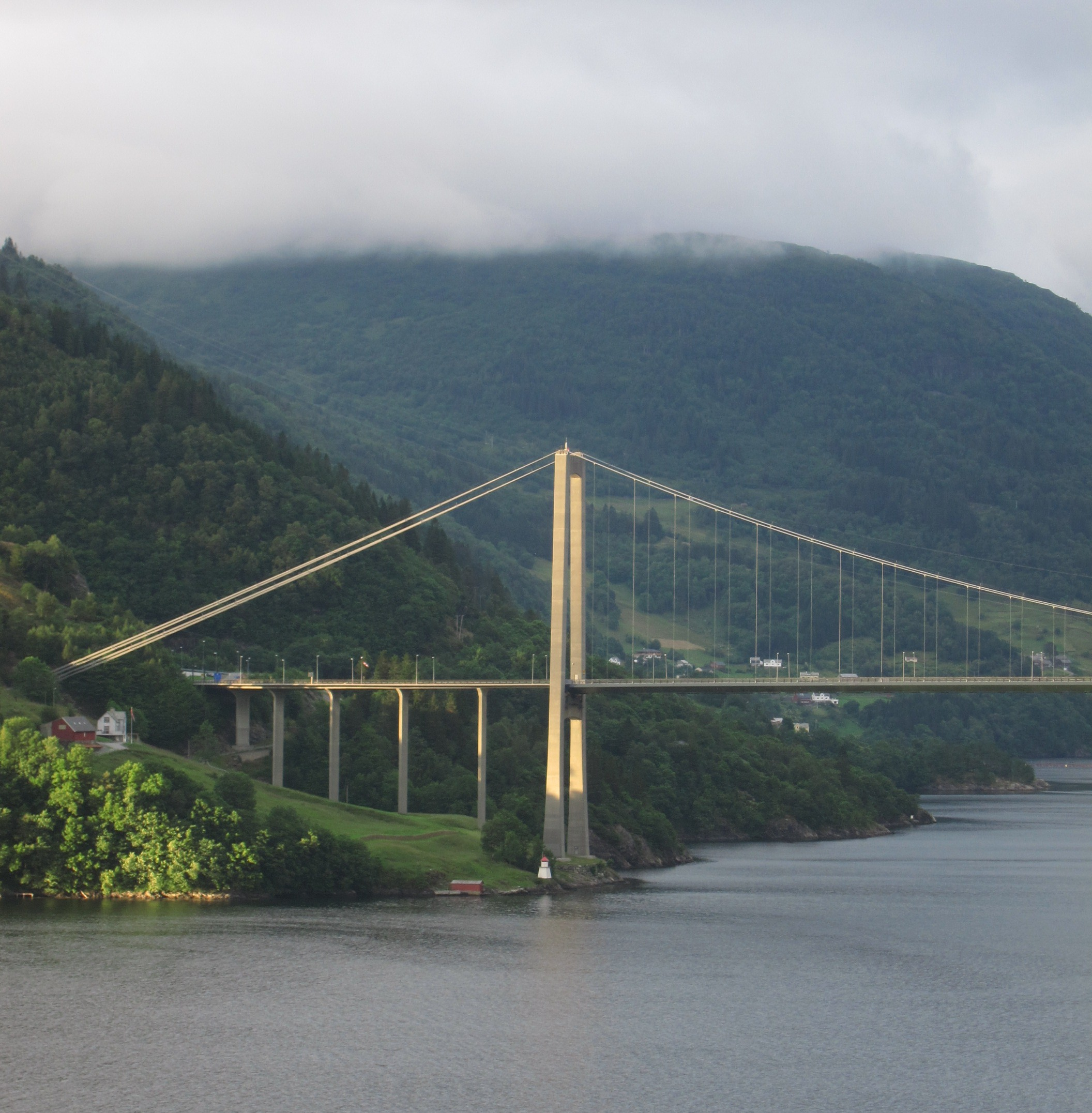
Osterøy Bridge

Osterøy is connected to the mainland by a ferry from Breistein to Valestrand, and by a bridge on the far southern end of the island. The ferry named "Ole Bull" is sailing every half-hour from Breistein and Valestrand from early morning to late in the evening.

The Osterøy Bridge, finished in 1997, provides Osterøy with its only permanent road connection to the mainland in Bergen municipality. The bridge has a main span of 595 metres (1,952 ft), the third longest suspension bridge main span in Norway, for a total length of 917 metres (3,009 ft). Since 2015, the bridge has been toll-free. There are no road connections from Osterøy municipality to the Vaksdal municipality part of Osterøy island. That part of the island has the Kallestadsundet Bridge connecting it to the rest of Vaksdal municipality from the east.

== Population ==
Historical population
Year	1964	1970	1980	1990	2000	2010	2020	2023
Pop.	5,518	5,660	6,579	7,016	7,006	7,412	8,098	8,152
±% p.a.	—	+0.42%	+1.52%	+0.65%	−0.01%	+0.56%	+0.89%	+0.22%
Source: Statistics Norway and Norwegian Historical Data Centre

== Notable people ==
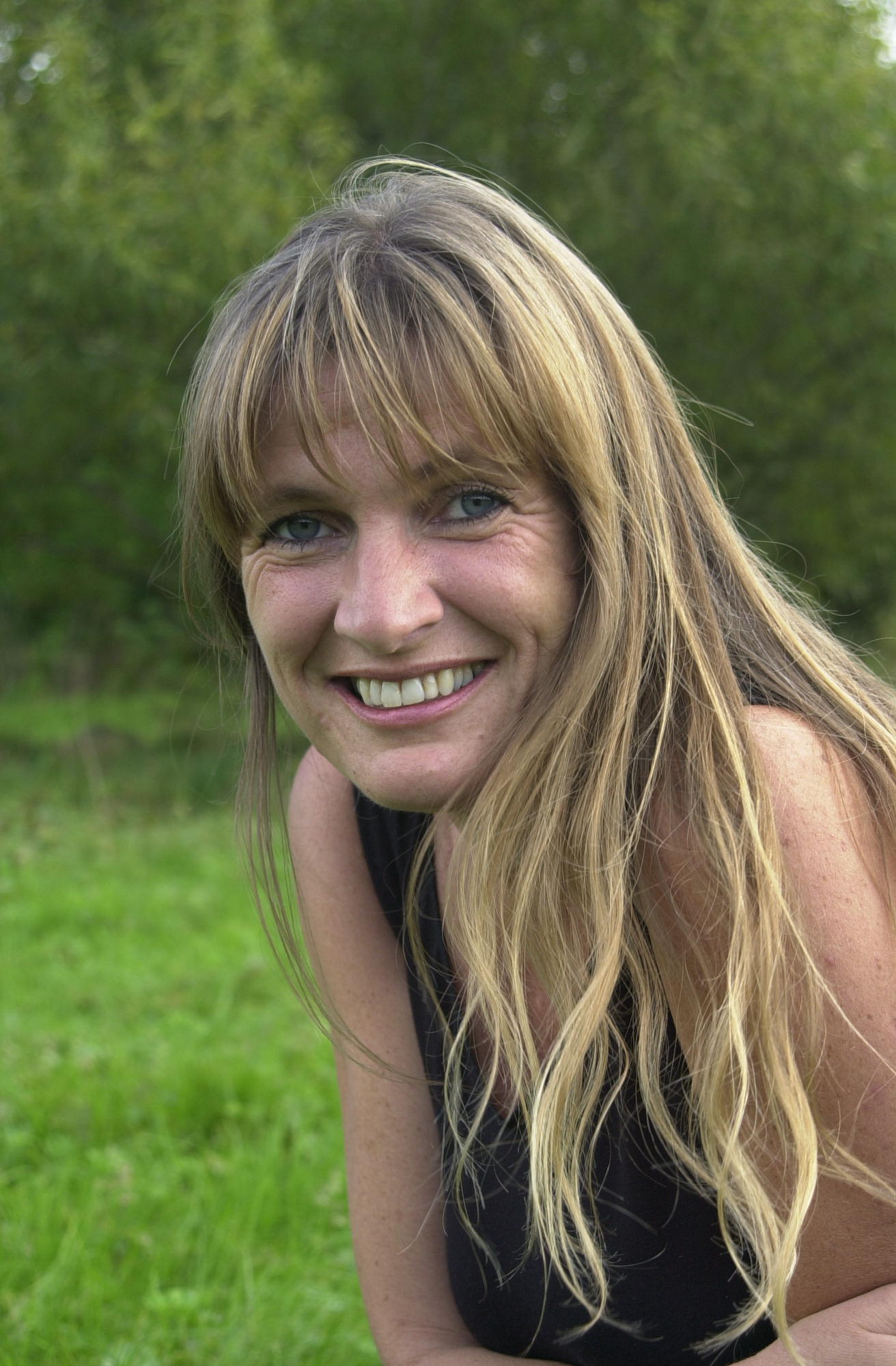
Sylvelin Vatle

- Jens Frølich Tandberg (1852 in Hausvik – 1922), the bishop of Oslo from 1912 to 1922
- Ola Raknes (1887–1975), a psychologist, philologist, and non-fiction writer, grew up in Hamre
- Einar Selvik (born 1979), a musician primarily known for his work with Gorgoroth and for fronting Wardruna
- Sylvelin Vatle (born 1957), a novelist and children's writer
- Tore Eikeland, (Norwegian Wiki) (1990-2011), a politician

=== Sport ===
- Mons Ivar Mjelde (born 1967), a former footballer with 287 club caps and coach
- Erlend Hanstveit (born 1981), a former footballer with 330 club caps
- Sigrid Borge (born 1995 in Hausvik) a Norwegian javelin thrower

== See also ==
- nn:Bygdanytt, the local newspaper (in Norwegian)
