= Valestrandsfossen =

Village in Osterøy Municipality, Norway

Valestrandsfossen Valestrandfossen
- Village
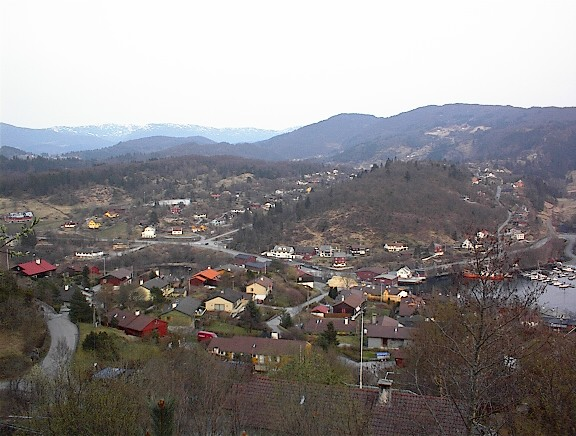
- View of the village
- Interactive map of Valestrandsfossen
- Coordinates: 60.5057°N 5.43276°E
- Country: Norway
- Region: Western Norway
- County: Vestland
- District: Nordhordland
- Municipality: Osterøy Municipality

Area
  - Total: 0.94 km^{2} (0.36 sq mi)
- Elevation: 16 m (52 ft)

Population (2025)
  - Total: 1,380
  - Density: 1,468/km^{2} (3,800/sq mi)
- Time zone: UTC+01:00 (CET)
  - Summer (DST): UTC+02:00 (CEST)
- Post Code: 5281 Valestrandsfossen

Valestrandsfossen or Valestrandfossen is a village in Osterøy Municipality in Vestland county. It lies along the Sørfjorden, just across the fjord from Bergen Municipality and about 15 kilometres (9.3 mi) northeast of the city of Bergen, the second largest city in Norway. Valestrandsfossen lies about 5 kilometres (3.1 mi) to the southwest of the village of Lonevåg, about 6 kilometres (3.7 mi) southeast of the village of Hamre, and about 8 kilometres (5.0 mi) northwest of the village of Haus.

Valestrandfossen is the largest settlement on the whole island of Osterøy. The 0.94-square-kilometre (230-acre) village has a population (2025) of 1,380 and a population density of 1,468 inhabitants per square kilometre (3,800/sq mi).

Valestrandsfossen has shops, a gas station, a primary school, hairdressers, pubs, and Lerøy Fossen AS which is the world's largest trout smokehouse. Due to its location by the Sørfjorden, it has a regular ferry (the MF Ole Bull) that crosses the fjord to Åsane in Bergen Municipality.

Norwegian violinist and composer Ole Bull bought a farm in Valestrand in 1858. His brother, architect Georg Andreas Bull, designed the house in 1865. In 1872, Ole Bull bought the island of Lysøya in what is now Bjørnafjorden Municipality, south of the city of Bergen which became the primary residence of his family and his newly constructed Villa Lysøen.

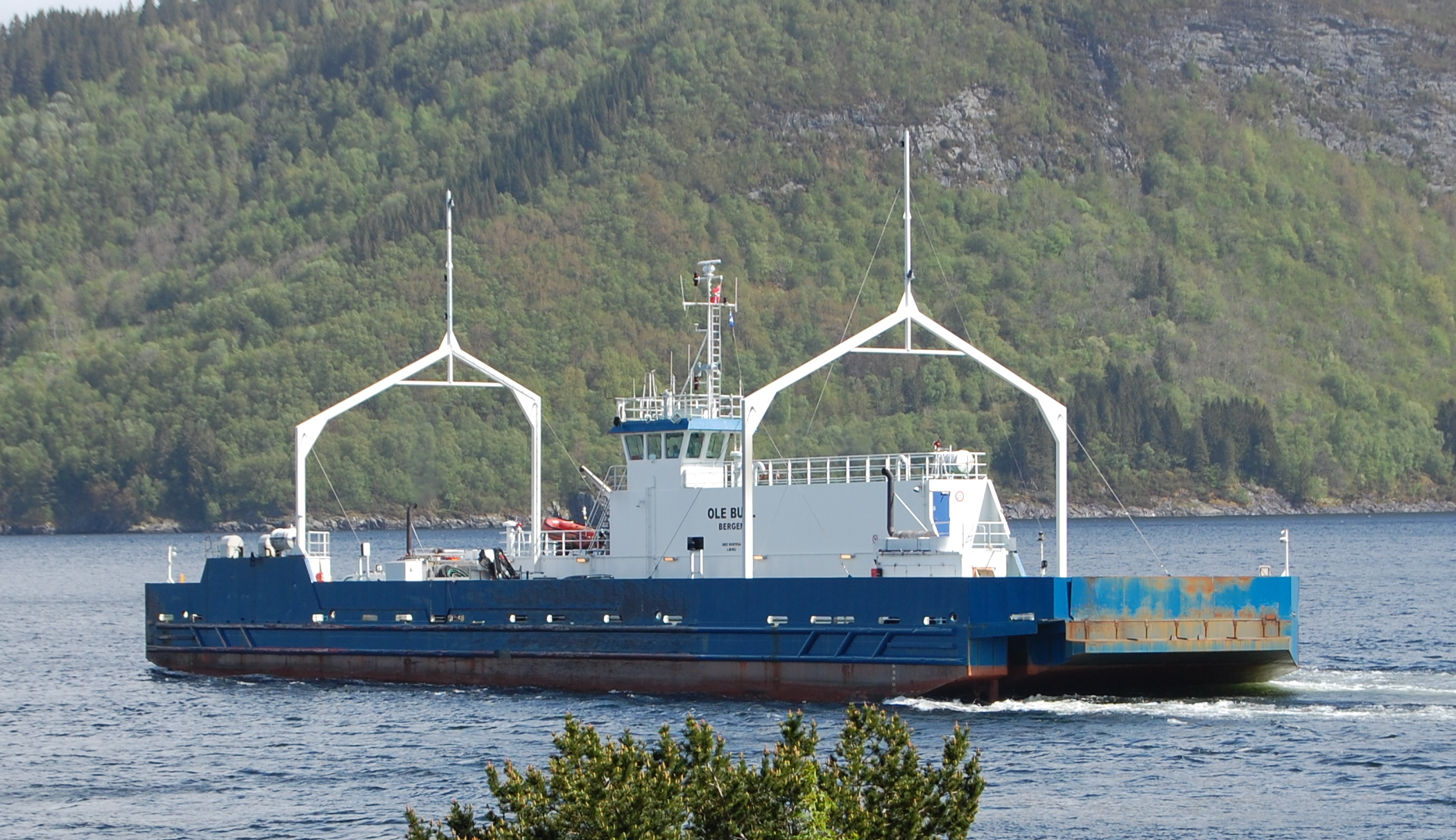
MF Ole Bull ferry that runs between the village and Åsane

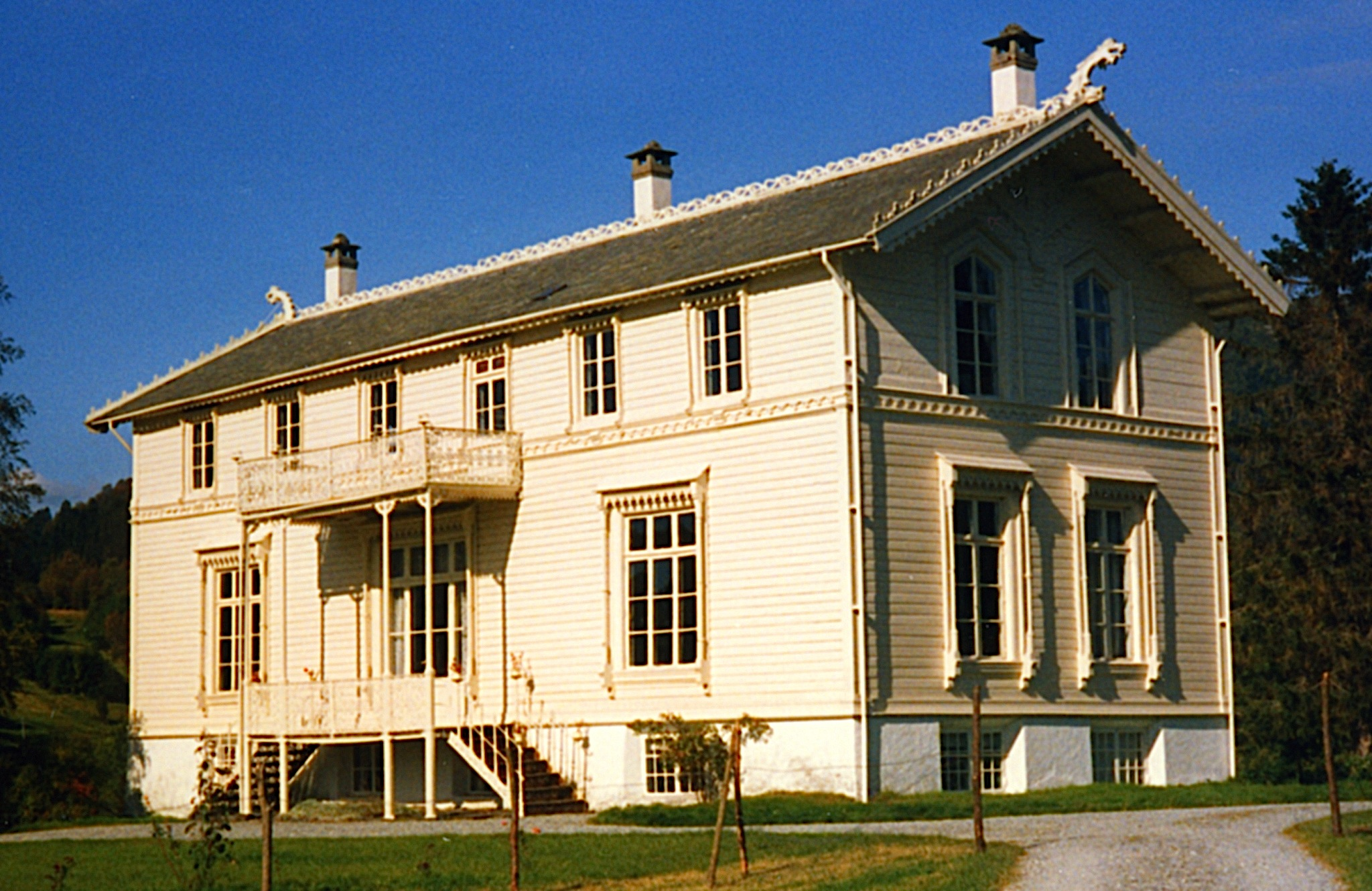
Ole Bull summer house at Valestrandfossen
