= Høgafjellet =

Mountain in Vestland, Norway

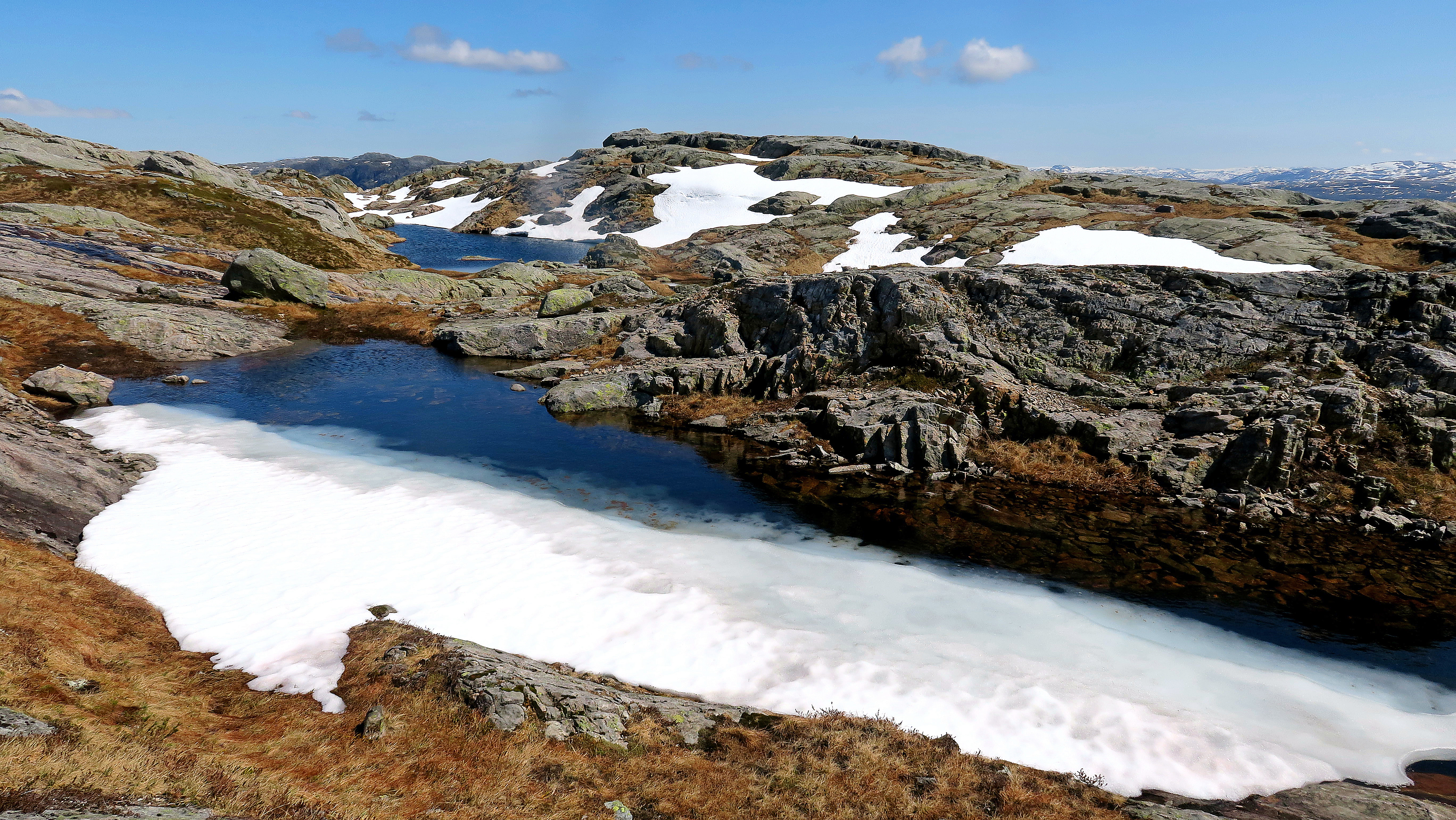

Highest point
- Elevation: 868 m (2,848 ft)
- Prominence: 868 m (2,848 ft)
- Isolation: 5.3 km (3.3 mi)
- Coordinates: 60.5991°N 5.6766°E

Geography
- Location: Vestland, Norway

Climbing
- Easiest route: Hiking

Høgafjellet is a mountain on the island of Osterøy in Vestland county, Norway. Høgafjellet sits on the border between Osterøy Municipality and Vaksdal Municipality, about 8 kilometres (5.0 mi) east of the village of Fotlandsvåg and about 2 kilometres (1.2 mi) west of the Veafjorden. The 868-metre (2,848 ft) tall mountain is the highest mountain on the island and in all of Osterøy Municipality.

== See also ==
- List of mountains of Norway
