= Lonevåg =

Village in Osterøy Municipality, Norway

- Village
- Interactive map of Lonevåg
- Coordinates: 60.52556°N 5.49563°E
- Country: Norway
- Region: Western Norway
- County: Vestland
- District: Nordhordland
- Municipality: Osterøy Municipality

Area
  - Total: 0.94 km^{2} (0.36 sq mi)
- Elevation: 2 m (6.6 ft)

Population (2025)
  - Total: 975
  - Density: 1,026/km^{2} (2,660/sq mi)
- Time zone: UTC+01:00 (CET)
  - Summer (DST): UTC+02:00 (CEST)
- Post Code: 5282 Lonevåg

Lonevåg is the administrative centre of Osterøy Municipality in Vestland county, Norway. The village is located on the northern coast of the island of Osterøy, at the end of the 5-kilometre (3.1 mi) long Lonevågen fjord, which branches off the main Osterfjorden. There are some shops and some small industry in the village.

The 0.94-square-kilometre (230-acre) village has a population (2025) of 975 and a population density of 1,026 inhabitants per square kilometre (2,660/sq mi).
