= Osterøy (island) =

Island in Vestland, Norway

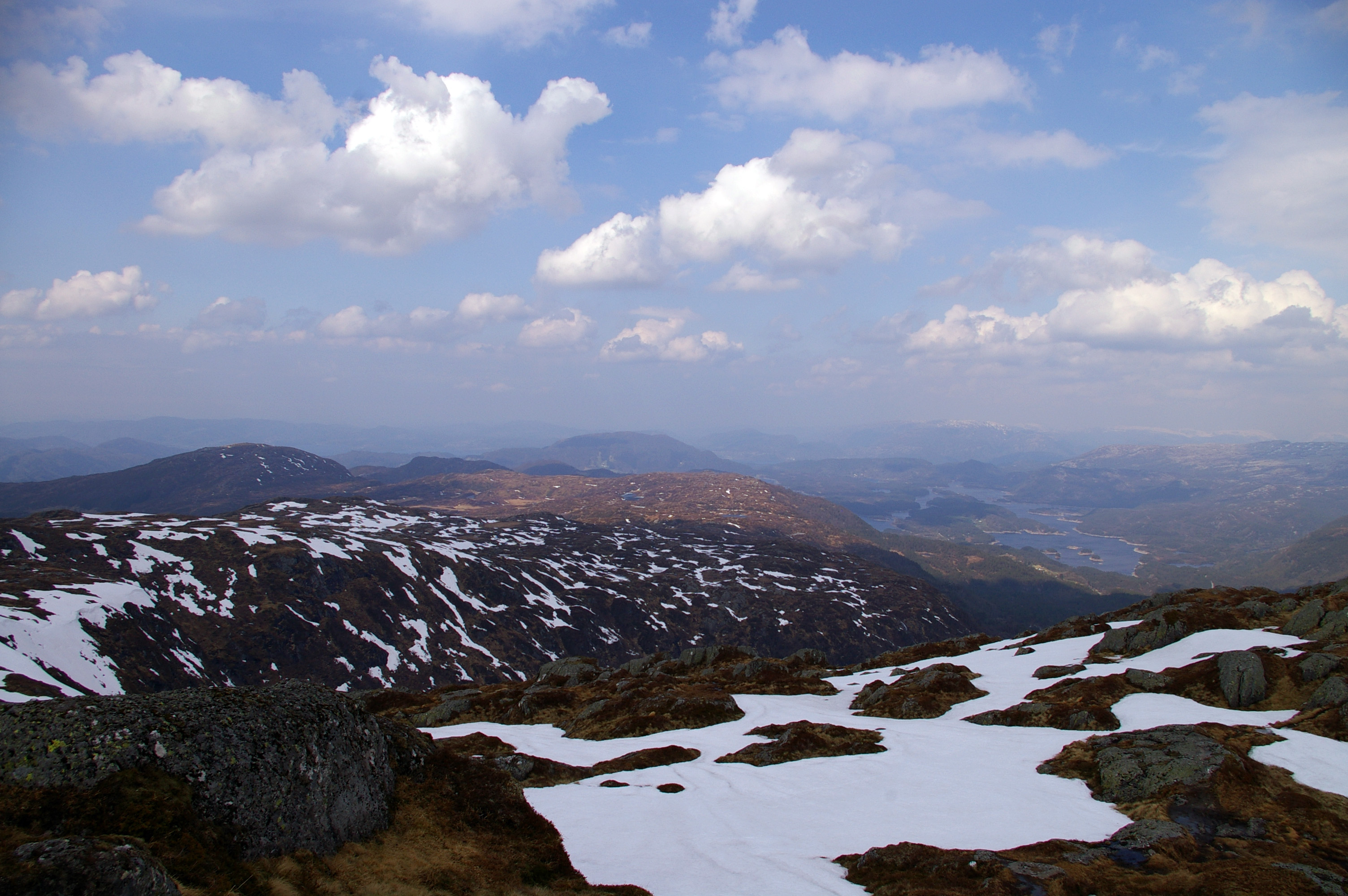
- View of the central part of the island
- Interactive map of Osterøy

Geography
- Location: Vestland, Norway
- Coordinates: 60.5350°N 5.5644°E
- Area: 328 km^{2} (127 sq mi)
- Length: 31 km (19.3 mi)
- Width: 21 km (13 mi)
- Highest elevation: 868 m (2848 ft)
- Highest point: Høgafjellet

Administration
- Norway
- County: Vestland
- Municipality: Osterøy and Vaksdal

Demographics
- Population: 8206 (2025)
- Pop. density: 25/km^{2} (65/sq mi)

Osterøy is an island in Vestland county, Norway. It is situated northeast of the city of Bergen. With a total area of 328 square kilometres (127 sq mi), it is the largest Norwegian island not located directly adjacent to the ocean, and the second largest such island in Northern Europe. Osterøy is covered by two municipalities: the majority (275 square kilometres (106 sq mi)) by Osterøy Municipality, and the rest (53 square kilometres (20 sq mi)) by Vaksdal Municipality. The vast majority of the island's population lives in Osterøy Municipality (7,305 inhabitants as of 2008).

The island is surrounded by fjords with mainland Norway on all sides of those fjords. The Osterfjorden-Romarheimsfjorden flows along the north side, the Sørfjorden flows along the southern and western sides, and the Veafjorden flows along the eastern side. The highest mountain on Osterøy is the 868-metre (2,848 ft) tall Høgafjellet.

There are two road bridges that connect the island to the rest of the road network in Norway. The first is the Osterøy Bridge, built in 1997 on the southwestern tip of the island. That bridge is the only road connection to the mainland for most residents of Osterøy. The other is the Kallestadsundet Bridge which connects the northeastern tip of the island to the mainland. The northeastern part of Osterøy only has one road, and it is not connected to the rest of the roads on the island, so to get from the northeastern part of the island to the rest of the island, one would have to cross the Kallestadsundet Bridge to leave the island, drive 40 kilometres (25 mi) along the mainland to the opposite side of the island, then cross the Osterøy Bridge to get back onto the island. This is why the northeastern part of the island is part of Vaksdal Municipality and the rest of the island is part of Osterøy Municipality.

== History ==
Historically, the island was divided by Hosanger Municipality in the north, Hamre Municipality in the west, Haus Municipality in the south, and Bruvik Municipality in the east. Most of the island became part of Osterøy Municipality in 1964.

== Media gallery ==
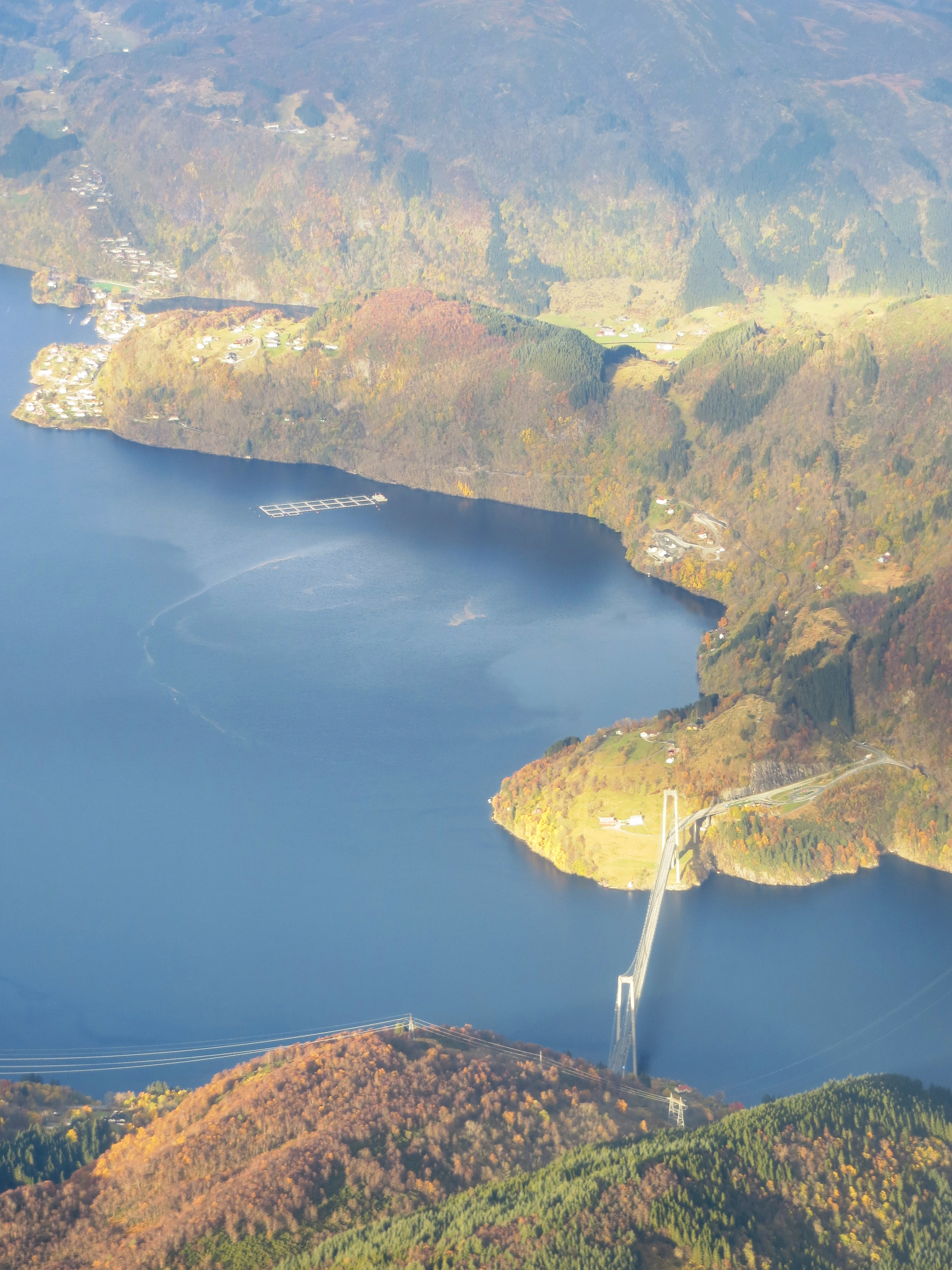
Southwestern tip of the island with the Osterøy Bridge

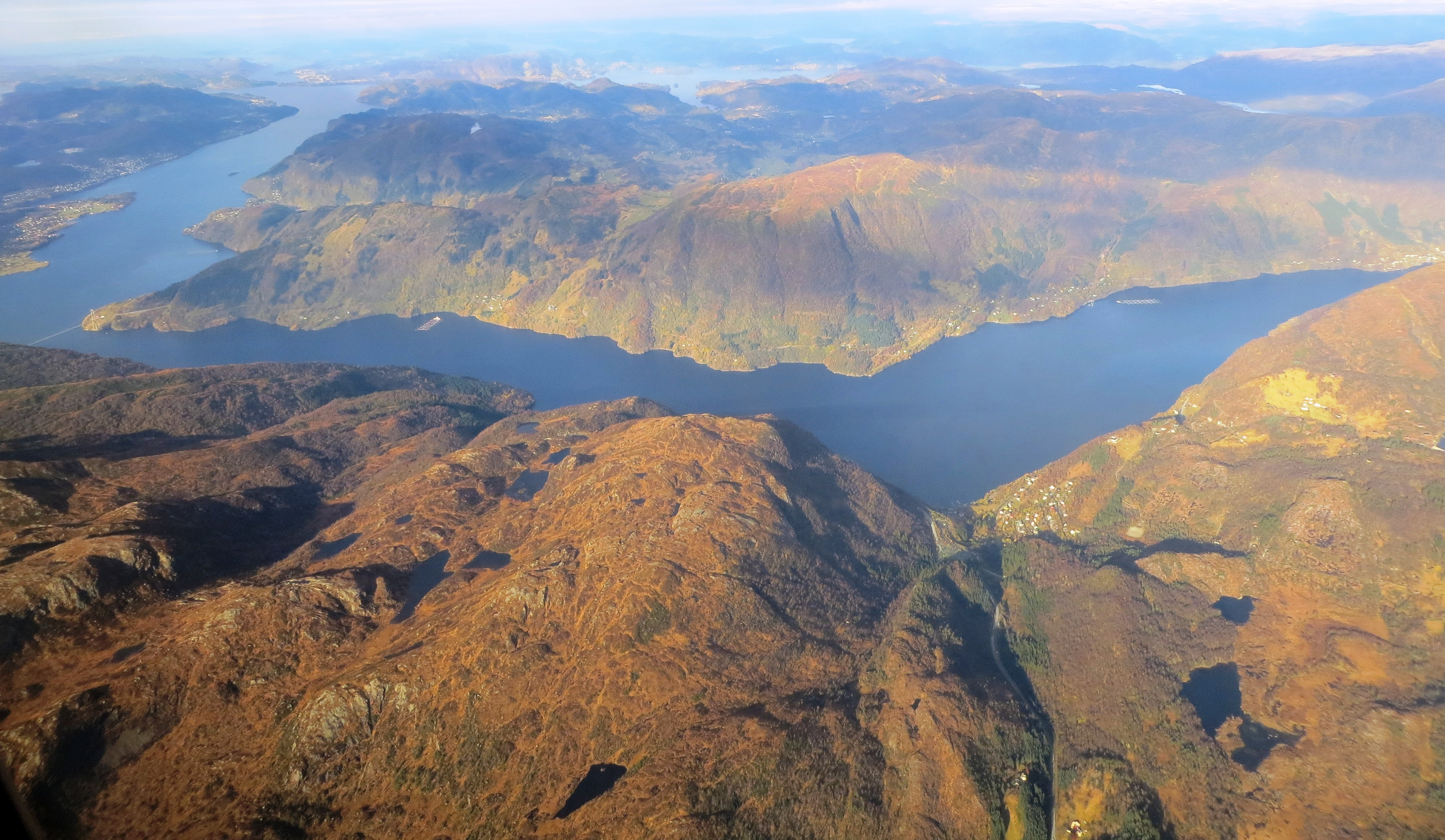
Western part of the island, surrounded by the Sørfjorden

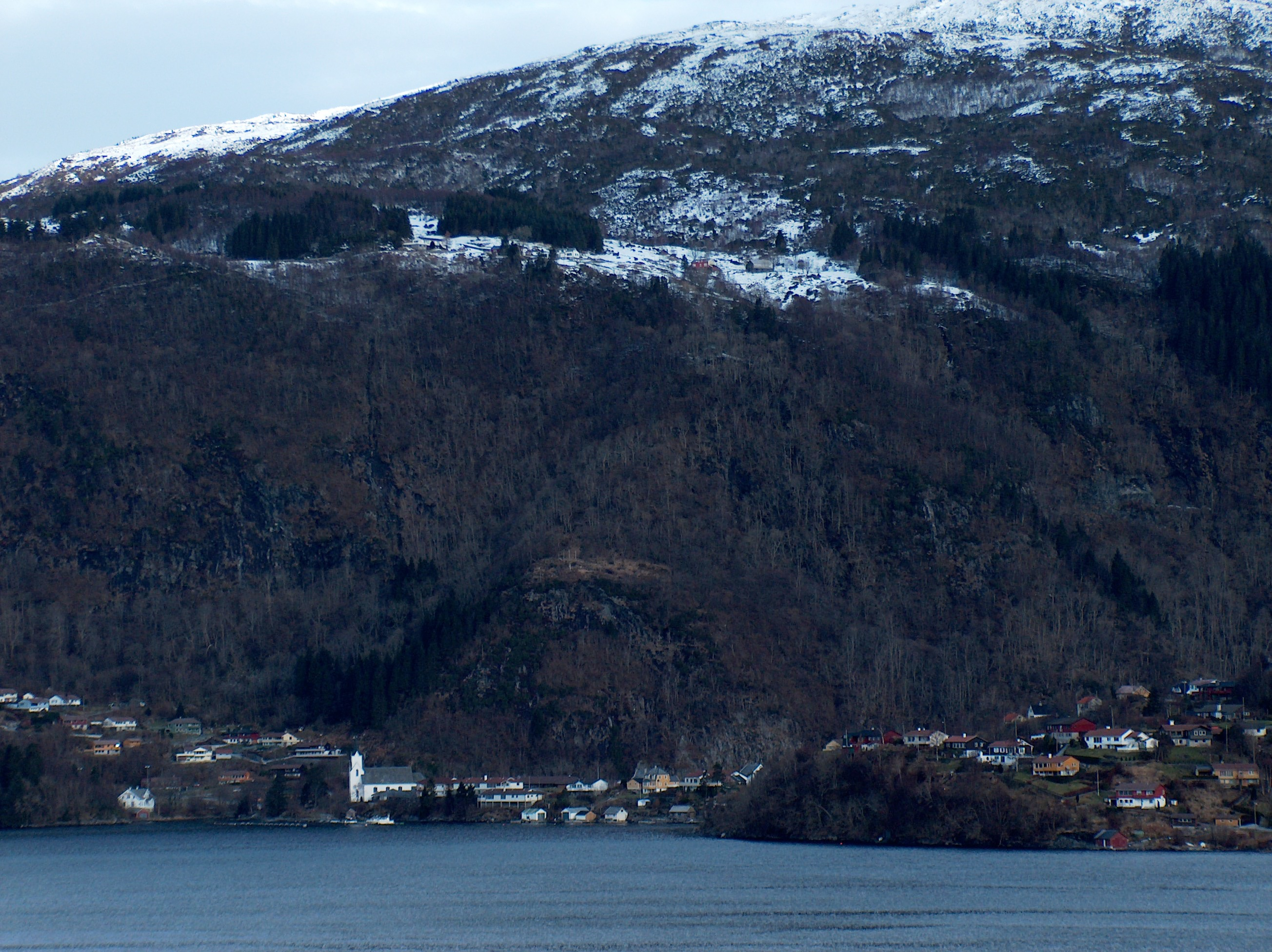
View of Hausvik, on the western coast

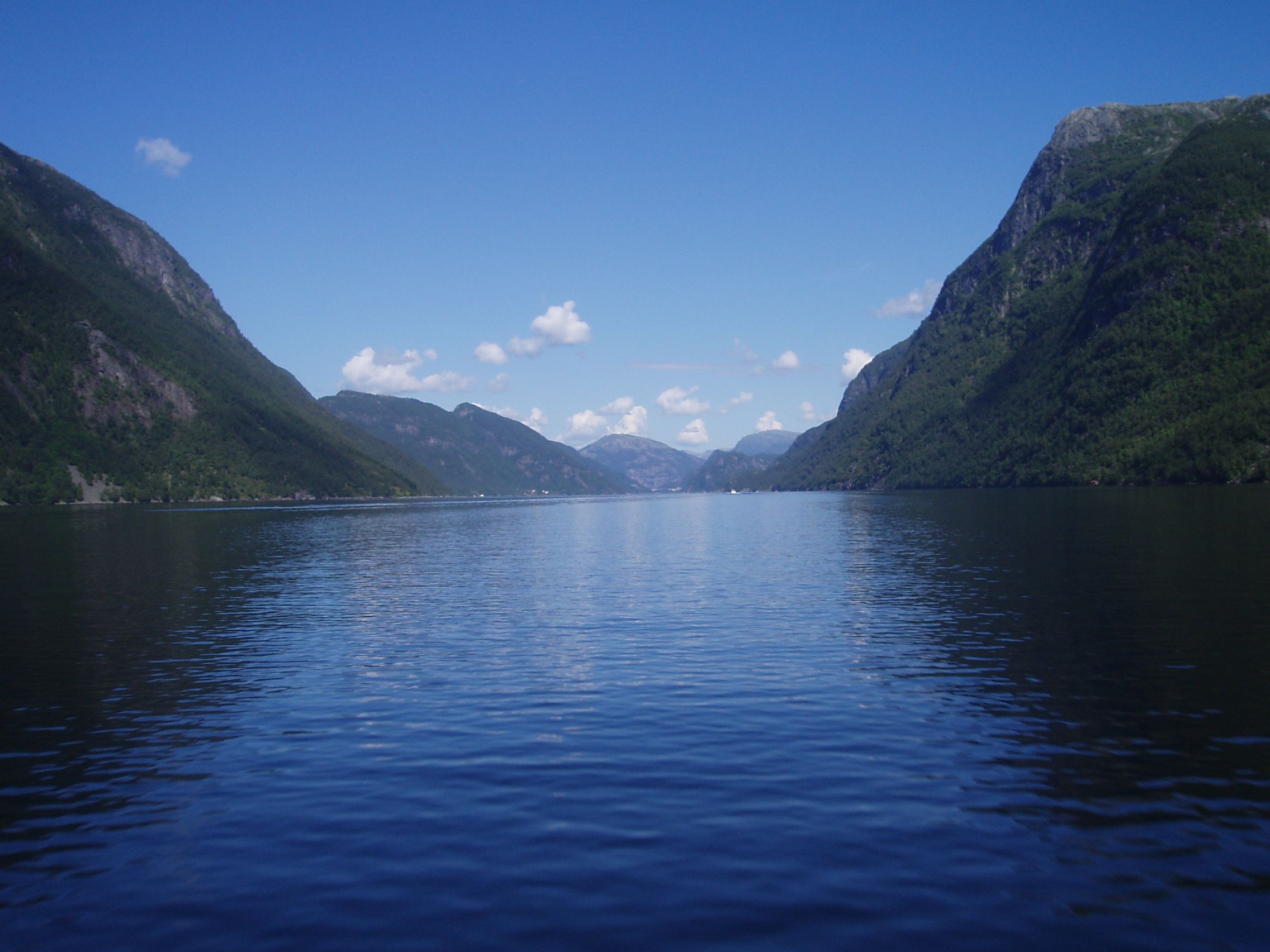
View of the Veafjorden with Osterøy to the left

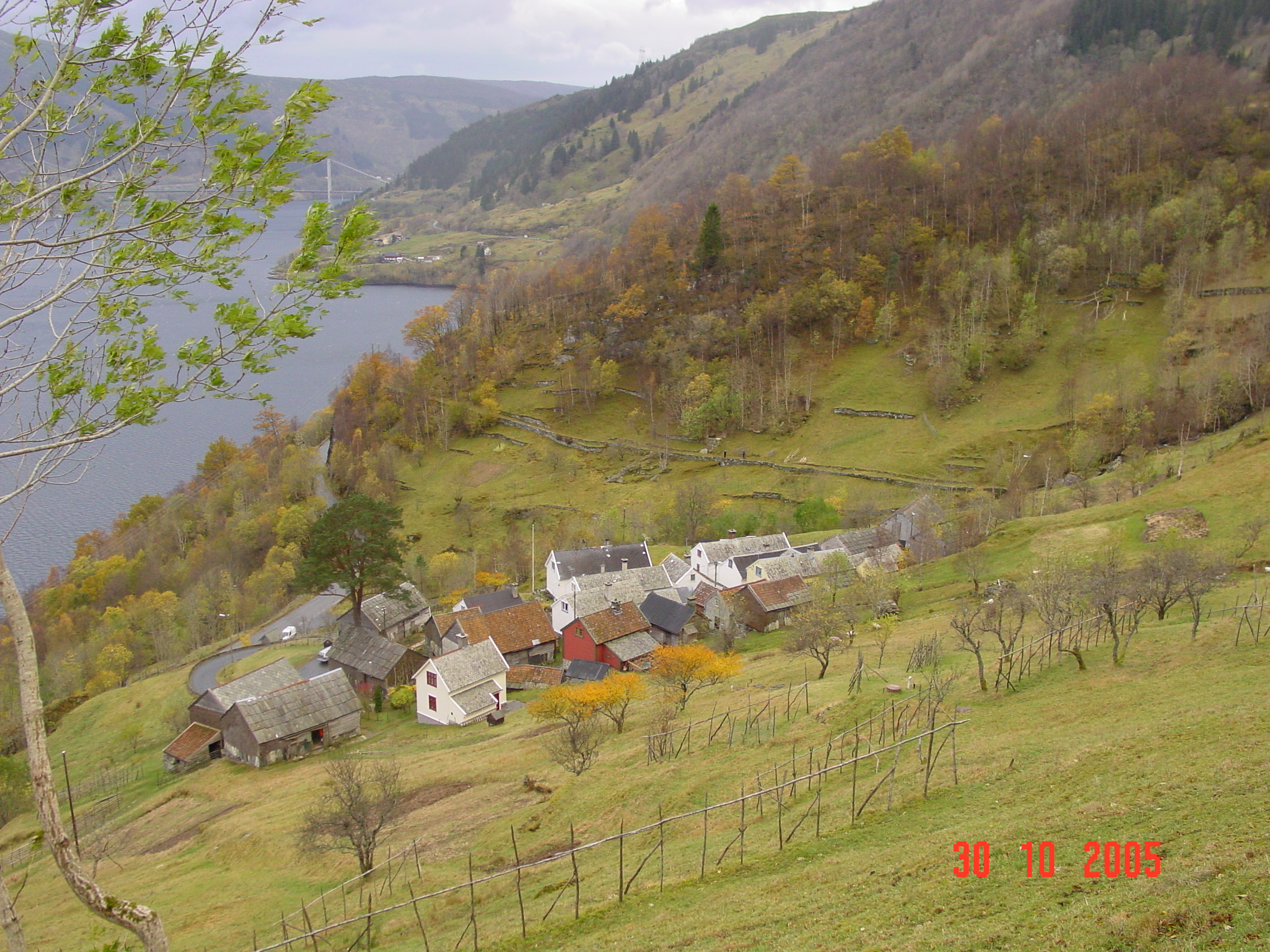
Havrå, a cluster farm on the southern coast of the island
