= Stamnes =

Stamnes may refer to the following locations:

- Stamnes, also known as Stamneshella, a village in Vaksdal Municipality in Vestland county, Norway
- Stamnes Church, a church in Vaksdal Municipality in Vestland county, Norway
- Stamnes Municipality, a former municipality in Nordland county, Norway
