= Vaksdal =

Vaksdal may refer to:

== Places ==
- Vaksdal Municipality, a municipality in Vestland county, Norway
- Vaksdal (village), a village within Vaksdal Municipality in Vestland county, Norway
- Vaksdal Church, a church in Vaksdal Municipality in Vestland county, Norway
- Vaksdal Station, a railway station in Vaksdal Municipality in Vestland county, Norway

== People ==
- Øyvind Vaksdal (born 1955), a Norwegian politician for the Progress Party

== Other ==
- VaksdalPosten, a local Norwegian newspaper published once a week in Vaksdal, Norway
