= Keiservarden =

Mountain in Norway

Coordinates: 67.314923°N 14.478502°E

Keiservarden is a mountain plateau on top of Veten hill near Bodø, Nordland in northern Norway (not to be confused with Veten near Bergen). It lies 366 meters (1,201 feet) above sea level and is named after German Emperor Wilhelm II, who supposedly climbed the mountain on one of his many visits to Norway on 19 July 1899. It is disputed though whether Wilhelm II really visited the place. The second half of the designation, varden is a Norwegian word for a pile of stones that indicate a mountaintop as well as the way up there.

The plateau offers a great view to every direction. Under good weather conditions the silhouette of Lofoten mountainline can be seen behind Vestfjorden. During Nordland music festival week (musikkfestuke) Keiservarden is also used as a venue for concerts. In the year 2016 stone stairs were built, thus an easy climb from Bodø turisthytta is guaranteed.

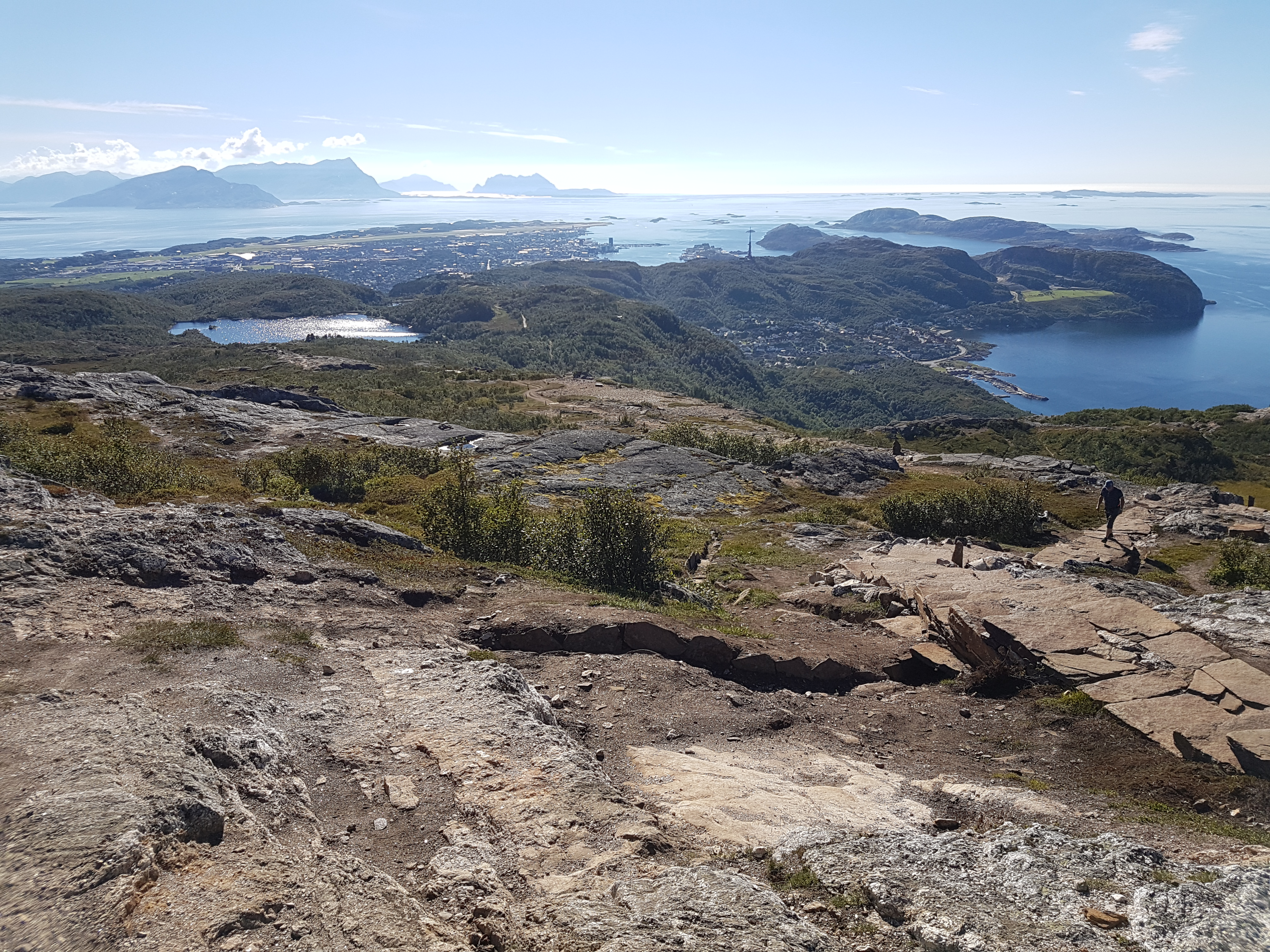
Overlooking Bodø from Keiservarden

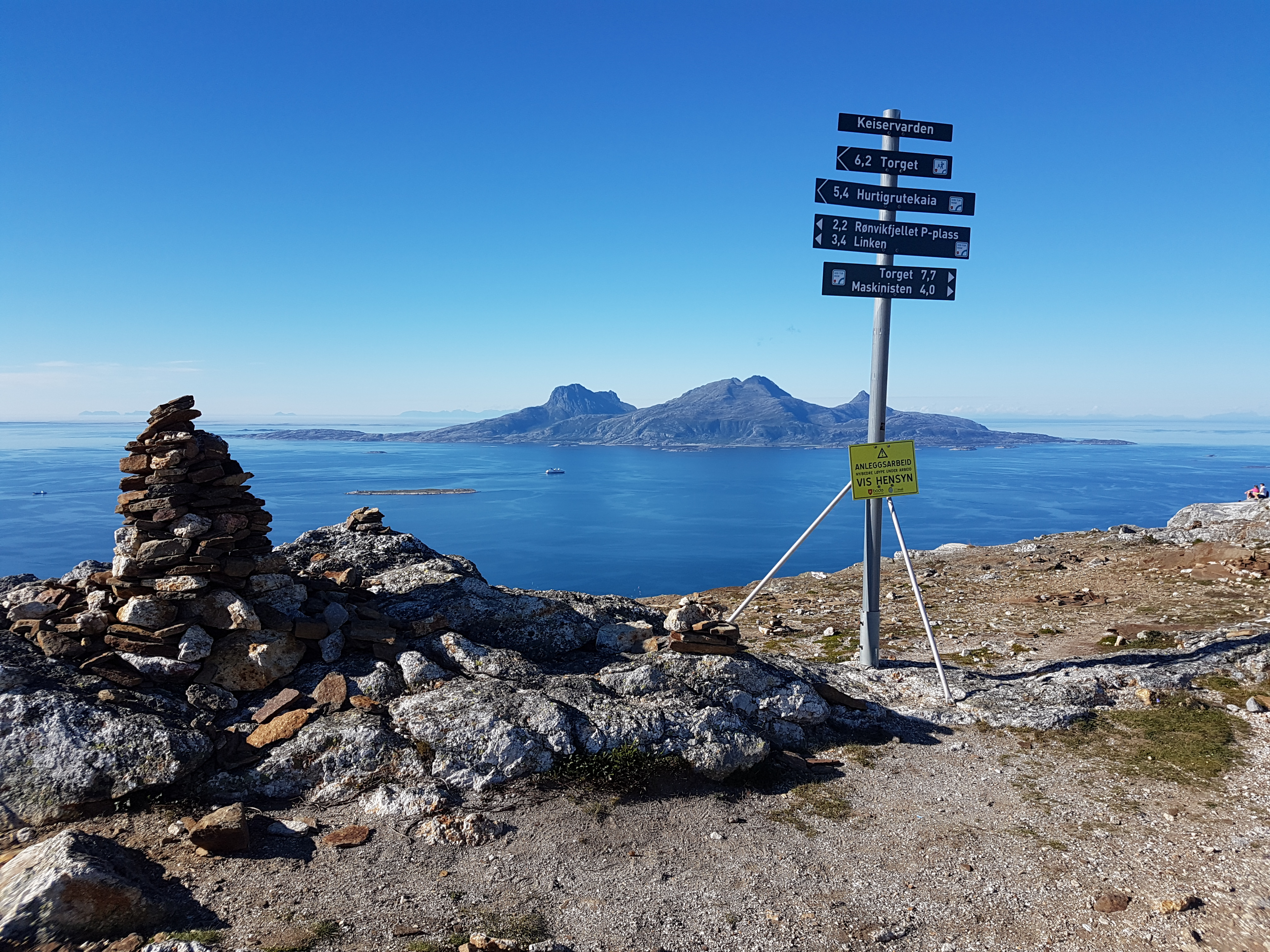
Guidepost on Keiservarden. In the background a ship of Hurtigruten line in front of Landegode island, at the horizon silhouette of Lofoten mountains can be seen.

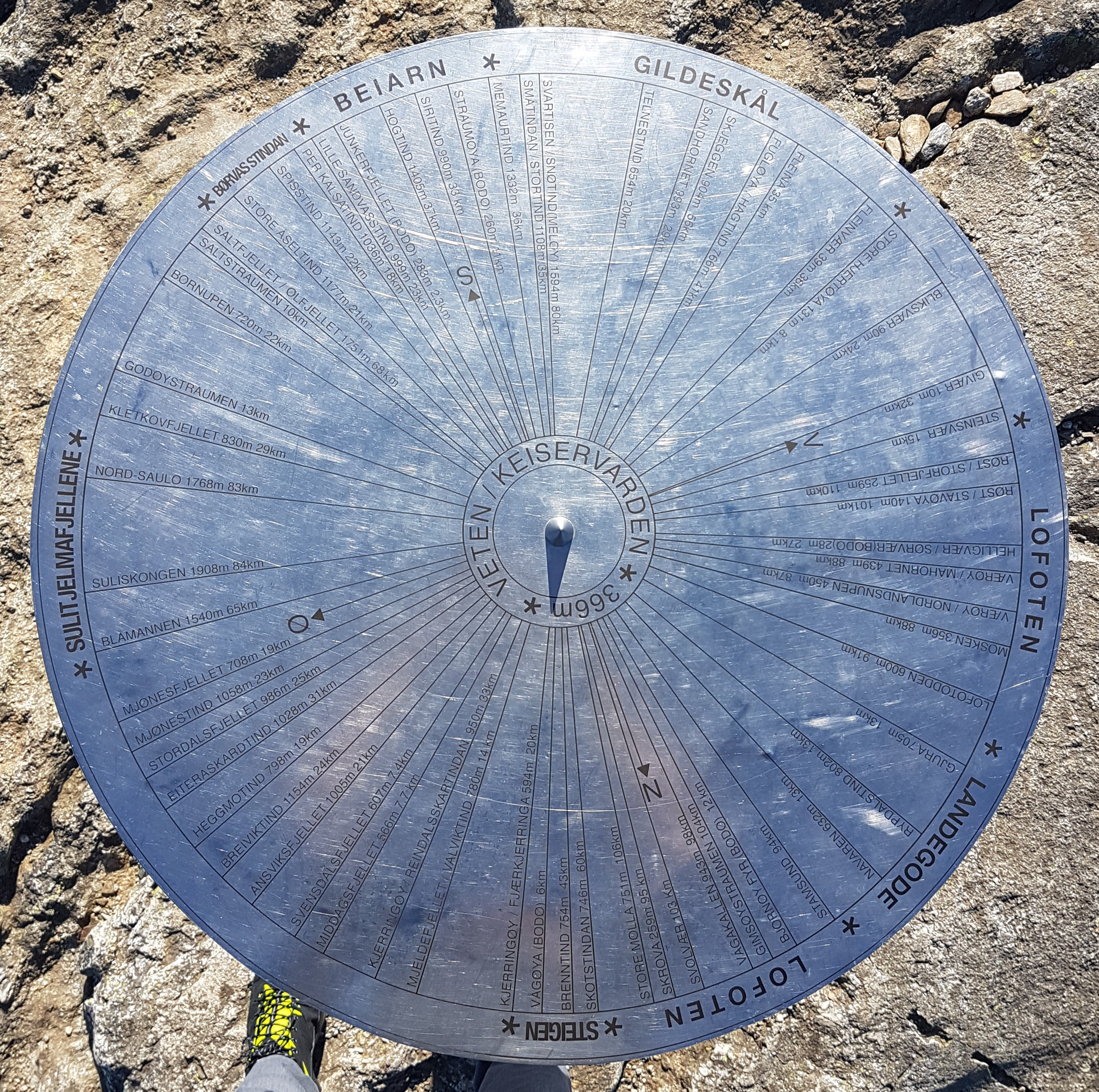
Summit guide on Keiservarden indicating different mountains, their respective distance from Keiservarden and height.

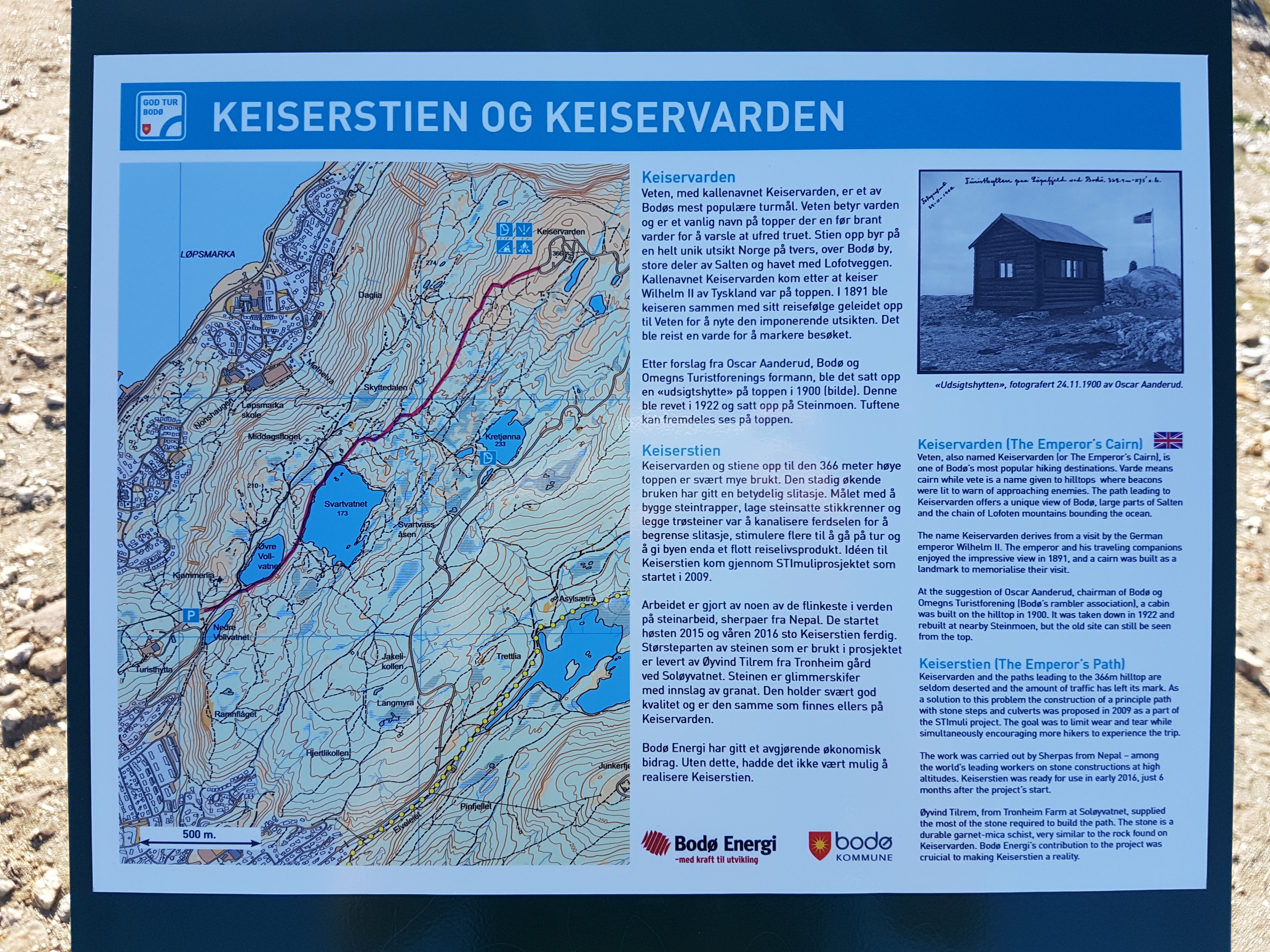
Board on Keiservarden telling about Wilhelm II's climb in 1891

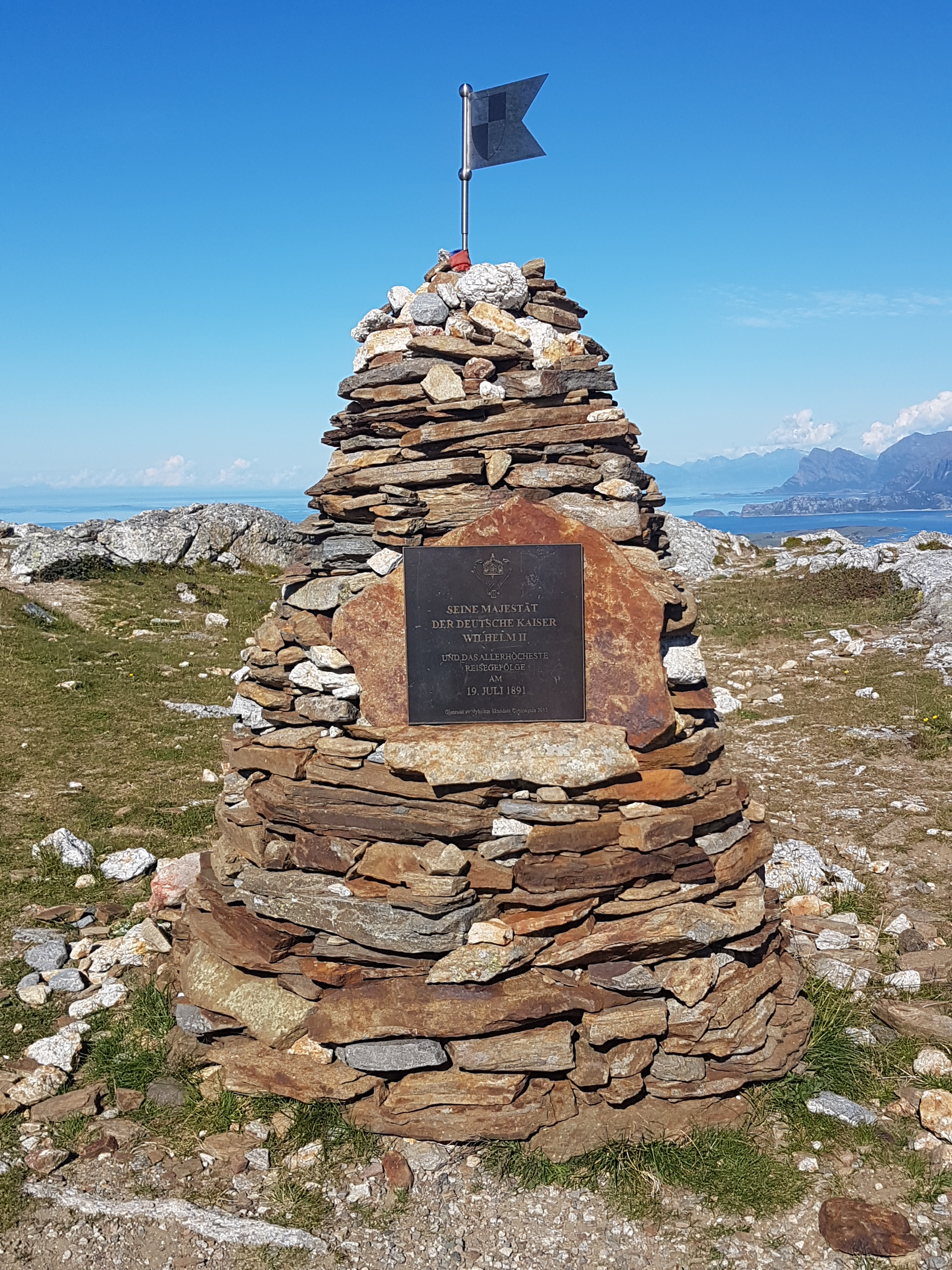
Plaque in honor of Wilhelm IIs climb, mounted on a real varden
