= Åsane (disambiguation) =

Åsane may refer to:

== Places ==
- Åsane, a borough in the city of Bergen, Norway
- Åsane Municipality, a former municipality in Hordaland county, Norway (now part of Bergen, Norway)
- Åsane Storsenter, a mall in the city of Bergen, Norway
- Åsane Church, a church in the city of Bergen, Norway
- Old Åsane Church, an historic church in the city of Bergen, Norway
- Åsane (Kristiansand), a neighborhood in the city of Kristiansand, Norway

== Sports ==
- Åsane Fotball, a Norwegian football club located in Bergen, Norway
- Åsane Seahawks, an American football and cheerleading team located in Bergen, Norway
