= Bjørnøy Lighthouse =

Coastal lighthouse in Norway

Bjørnøy Lighthouse Bjørnøy fyrstasjon
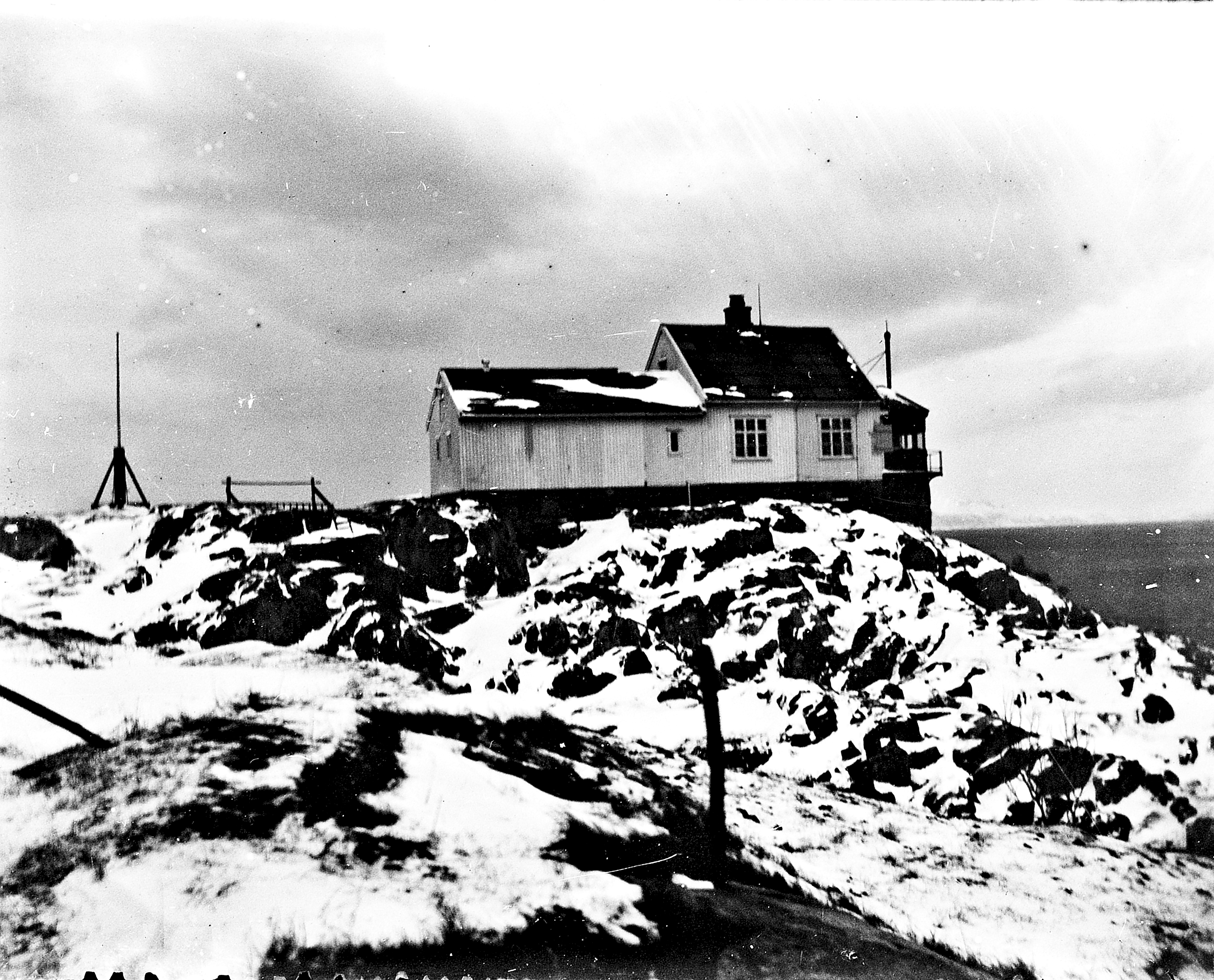
- Location: Bjørnøya, Bodø Municipality, Norway
- Coordinates: 67°25′11″N 14°25′43″E

Tower
- Construction: concrete
- Height: 7.6 m (25 ft)
- Shape: cylinder
- Markings: White (tower), red (roof)

Light
- First lit: 1972
- Focal height: 41.3 m (135 ft)
- Range: 12.9 nmi (23.9 km; 14.8 mi) (white), 10.3 nmi (19.1 km; 11.9 mi) (red), 9.8 nmi (18.1 km; 11.3 mi) (green)
- Characteristic: Oc WRG 7.5s
- Original lighthouse
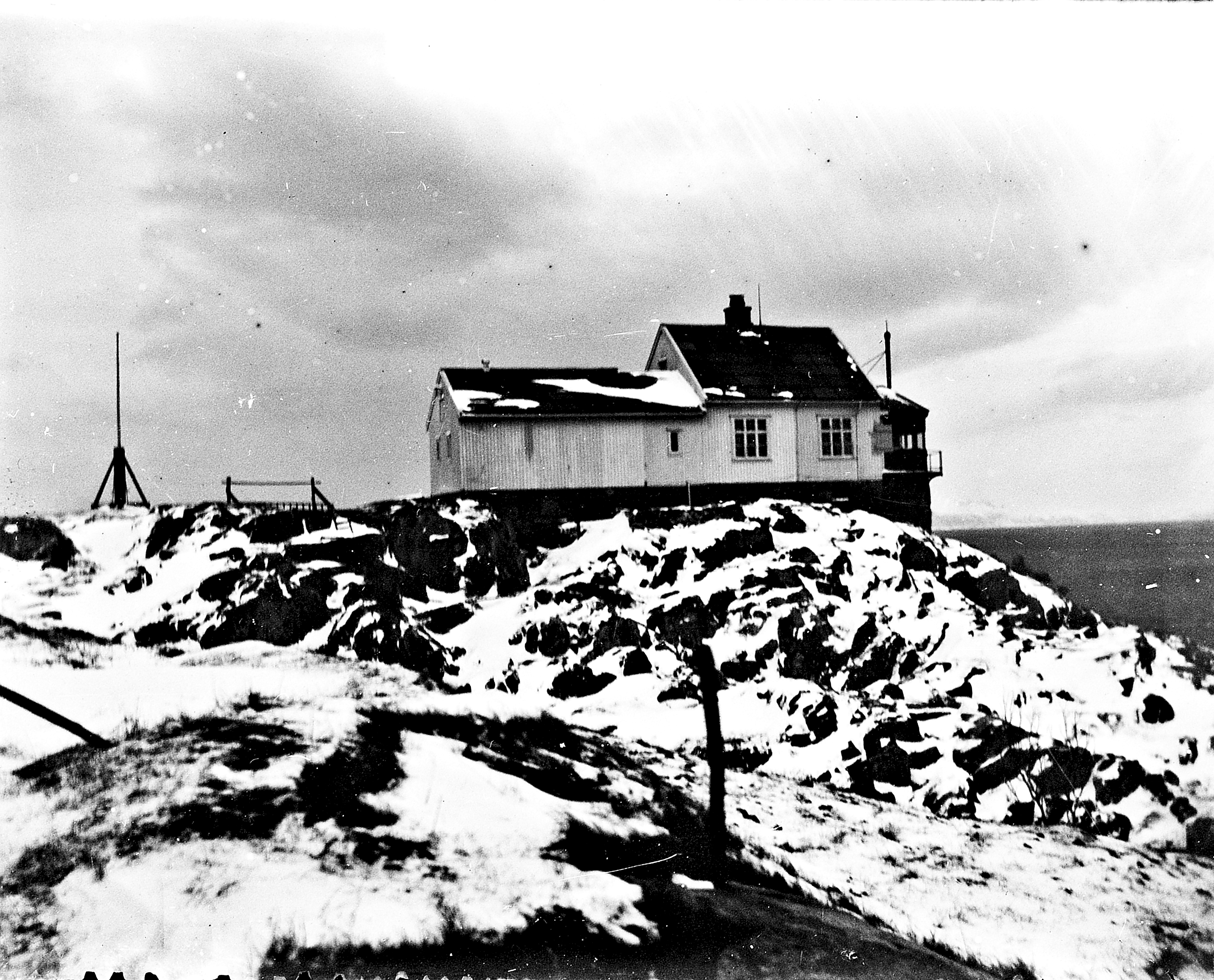
- Constructed: 1890
- Height: 9 m (30 ft)
- Deactivated: 1972

Bjørnøy Lighthouse (Norwegian: Bjørnøy fyr) is a coastal lighthouse in Bodø Municipality in Nordland county, Norway. It is located on the small island of Bjørnøya, just east of the larger Landegode island. The lighthouse is about 16 kilometres (9.9 mi) north of the town of Bodø and about 3 kilometres (1.9 mi) southeast of Landegode Lighthouse.

The light sits atop a 7.6-metre (25 ft) tall concrete tower. It has a white, red, or green light (depending on direction) that is occulting twice every 7.5 seconds. The lighthouse is painted white and the lantern roof is red. The light sits at an elevation of 41.3 metres (135 ft) above sea level.

== History ==
The original lighthouse building was constructed in 1890. The light was mounted on a stone base and attached to the seaward end of a 1 1/2-story keeper's house. The house was white and the light portion was red. That light was in use from 1890 until 1972 when it was replaced by a new, automated, concrete tower. The old building sits just a short distance from the new light.

== See also ==
- Lighthouses in Norway
- List of lighthouses in Norway
