= Breistein =

Breistein Breidstein
- Neighborhood in Bergen
- Interactive map of Breistein
- Coordinates: 60.4862°N 5.4038°E
- Country: Norway
- Region: Western Norway
- County: Vestland
- Municipality: Bergen
- Borough: Åsane
- Elevation: 21 m (69 ft)

Population (1999)
  - Total: 632
- Time zone: UTC+01:00 (CET)
  - Summer (DST): UTC+02:00 (CEST)

Breistein is a village in the borough of Åsane in Bergen Municipality in Vestland county, Norway. The village lies along the Sørfjorden on the eastern part of the municipality, across the fjord from the village of Valestrandsfossen. The European route E39 highway passes along the western edge of the village.

Its population in 1999 was 632, but since 2001 it has been counted as part of another urban area in Bergen, so its statistics are no longer separately tracked.
