= Arken =

Arken may refer to:

- Arken Abdulla, a Uyghur traditional folk song and pop music artist from Xinjiang, China
- ARKEN Museum of Modern Art near Copenhagen, Denmark
- Åsane Storsenter in Bergen, Norway
