= Kallestadsundet Bridge =

Kallestadsundet Bridge Kallestadsundet bru
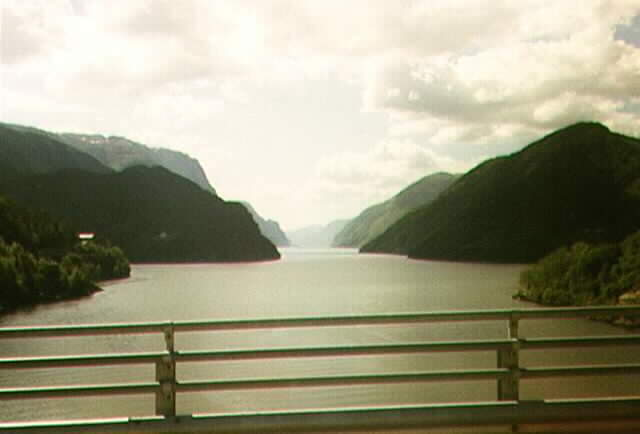
- View over Veafjorden from the bridge
- Coordinates: 60°40′26″N 05°44′05″E
- Carries: Fv341
- Crosses: Veafjorden
- Locale: Vaksdal Municipality

Characteristics
- Total length: 200 metres (660 ft)
- Clearance below: 30 metres (98 ft)

History
- Opened: 1985

Location
- Interactive map of Kallestadsundet Bridge

The Kallestadsundet Bridge is a bridge over the Veafjorden in Vaksdal Municipality in Vestland county, Norway. The 200-metre-long (660 ft) bridge links the mainland part of Vaksdal Municipality to the part that lies on the island of Osterøy. The bridge lies about 1 kilometre (0.62 mi) northwest of the village of Stamneshella. The bridge was opened in 1985 and it was the first bridge to connect Osterøy island to the mainland. In 1997, the Osterøy Bridge was opened for traffic, as the second bridge to Osterøy island.

== See also ==
- List of bridges in Norway
- List of bridges in Norway by length
