= Bruvik, Vestland =

Village in Osterøy Municipality, Norway

Bruvik Kyrkjebruvik
- Village
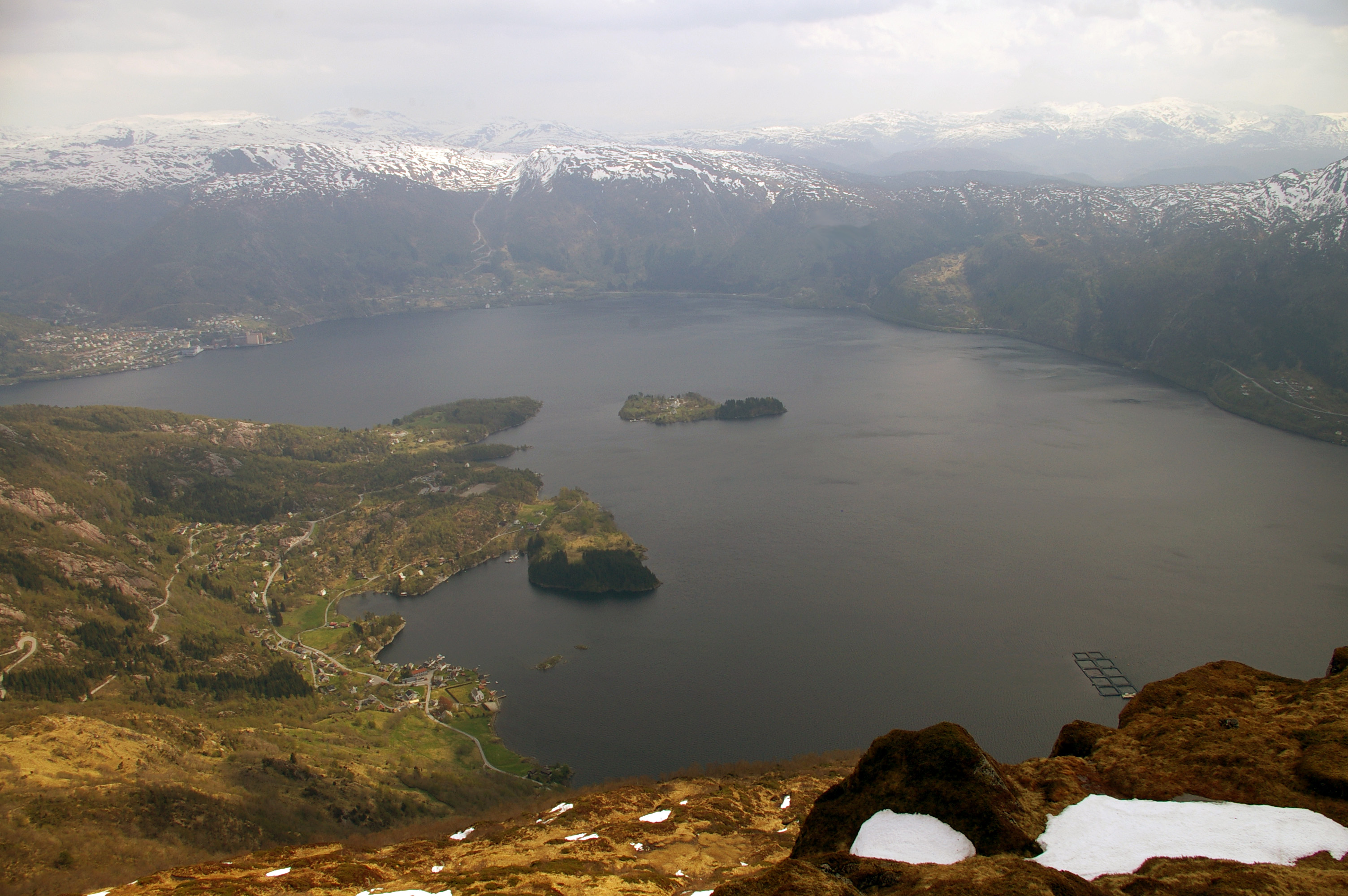
- View of the village (looking southeast)
- Interactive map of Bruvik
- Coordinates: 60.48073°N 5.68334°E
- Country: Norway
- Region: Western Norway
- County: Vestland
- District: Nordhordland
- Municipality: Osterøy Municipality
- Elevation: 18 m (59 ft)
- Time zone: UTC+01:00 (CET)
  - Summer (DST): UTC+02:00 (CEST)
- Post Code: 5285 Bruvik

Bruvik (historically: Kyrkjebruvik) is a village in Osterøy Municipality in Vestland county, Norway. The village is located on the southern shore of the island of Osterøy, along the Sørfjorden. It sits about 13 kilometres (8.1 mi) east of the village of Hausvik and about 3 kilometres (1.9 mi) across the fjord from the village of Vaksdal.

== History ==
Historically, the village of Bruvik was the administrative centre of the old Bruvik Municipality which existed from 1870 until 1964. Bruvik Church has been located here for centuries, as has the parish of Bruvik for the Church of Norway. Bruvik was a central hub for the region since it sat along the fjord and boat travel was the main mode of transportation, but as time progressed, railroads and highways were built on the opposite side of the fjord, and that side grew into larger urban areas while Bruvik has now become less important since it has only one road leading to it from the rest of Norway.

The small island of Olsnesøyna lies about 1.7 kilometres (1.1 mi) southeast of Bruvik in the middle of the fjord. It was the site of school for disobedient boys and later used by the local county jail. In June 2019, it was closed and sold to a private owner for 11.8 million kr.
