= Veafjorden =

Fjord in Vestland, Norway

- Vedåfjorden
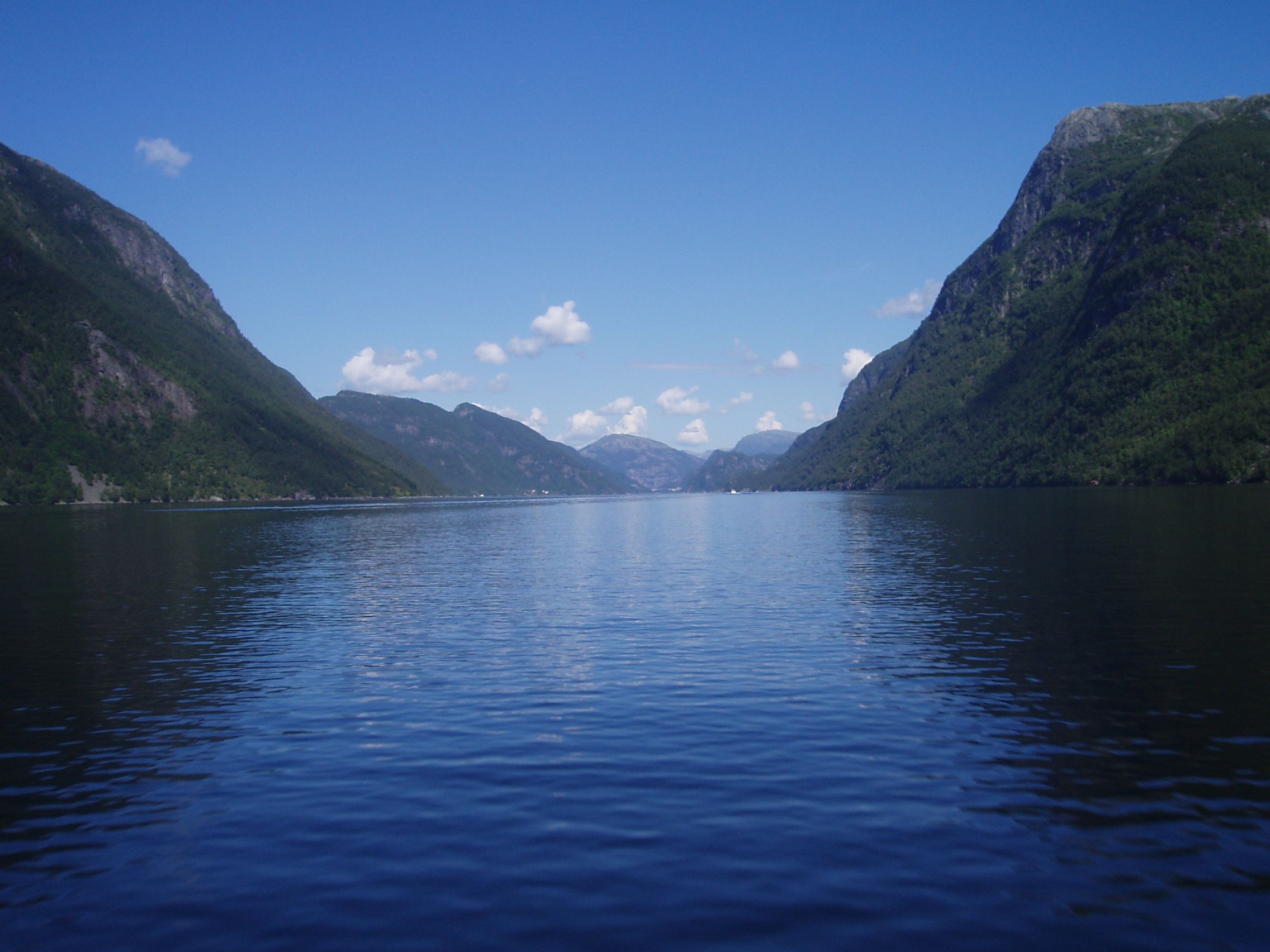
- View of the fjord
- Interactive map of Veafjorden
- Location: Vestland county, Norway
- Coordinates: 60.57333°N 5.71831°E
- Type: Fjord
- Primary inflows: Bolstadfjorden
- Primary outflows: Sørfjorden, Osterfjorden
- Basin countries: Norway
- Max. length: 15 kilometres (9.3 mi)
- Max. width: 1 kilometre (0.62 mi)
- Settlements: Vaksdal, Stanghelle, Stamneshella

Veafjorden (historically, the Vedåfjorden) is a fjord in Vestland county, Norway. The 15-kilometre (9.3 mi) long fjord flows between the mainland and the island of Osterøy in Vaksdal Municipality. There is one bridge across the fjord, the Kallestadsundet Bridge near Stamneshella.

The fjord is named after the old Veo farm, located on the shore of Osterøy island, about 9 kilometres (5.6 mi) north of Stanghelle. The farm sits at the foot of steep mountains and is only accessible by boat or by hiking by foot for 4 kilometres (2.5 mi) to the nearest road.

A scene from the movie "The Golden Compass" was filmed along the Veafjorden.

== See also ==
- List of Norwegian fjords
