= Sørfjorden (Osterøy) =

Fjord in Vestland, Norway

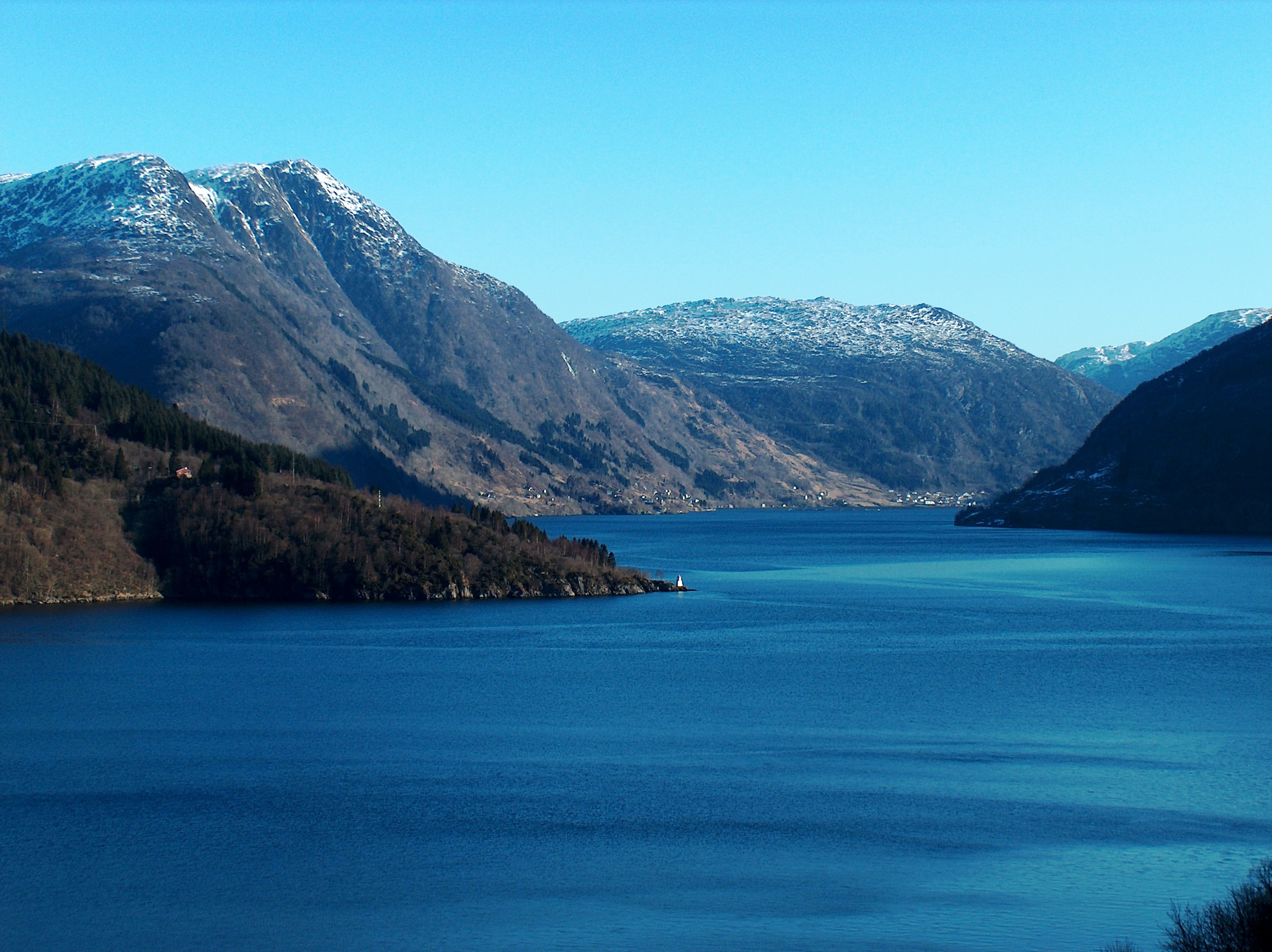
- View of the fjord, looking east towards Bruvik. Brøknipa/Bruviknipa on the left and Trengereid on the right
- Interactive map of Sørfjorden
- Location: Vestland county, Norway
- Coordinates: 60.42833°N 5.55211°E
- Type: Fjord
- Primary inflows: Veafjorden
- Primary outflows: Osterfjorden
- Basin countries: Norway
- Max. length: 30 kilometres (19 mi)
- Max. width: 2 kilometres (1.2 mi)

Sørfjorden is a 30-kilometre (19 mi) long fjord in Vestland county, Norway. The fjord flows around the west and south sides of the island of Osterøy, going through Osterøy Municipality, Bergen Municipality, and Vaksdal Municipality. The fjord begins at the village of Vaksdal where the Veafjorden flows into the Sørfjorden, it then heads west and then north before emptying into the Osterfjorden. The fjord flows past the following villages: Bruvik, Vaksdal, Hausvik, Garnes, Ytre Arna, Hylkje, Breistein, Valestrandfossen, Steinstø and Hamre.

Prior to the opening of Osterøy Bridge in 1997 there were two ferries crossing the fjord: Haus–Garnes and Valestrandfossen–Breistein, the first one was closed when the bridge opened and the second one is still in operation.

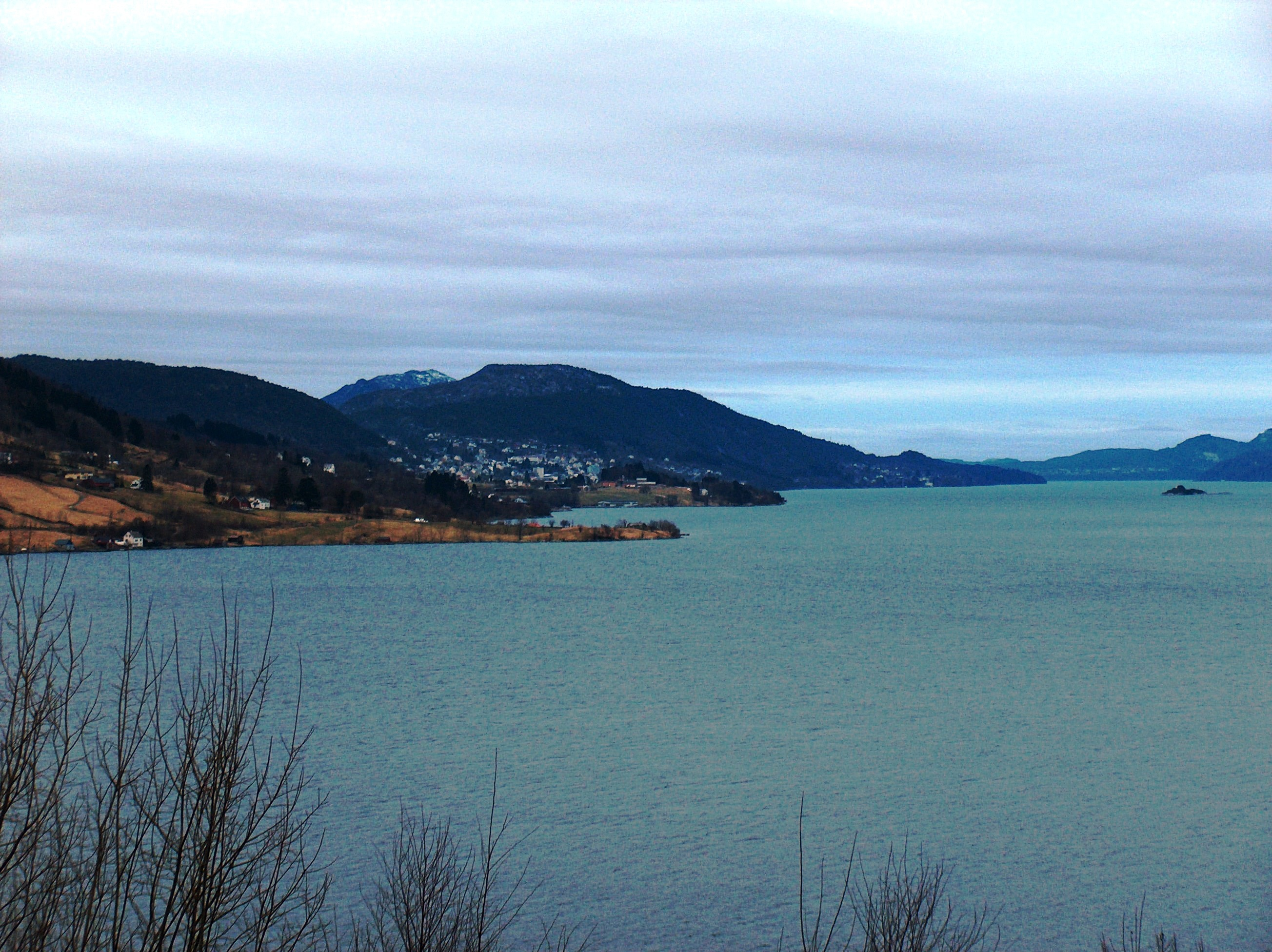
Looking northwest towards Garnes and Ytre Arna.

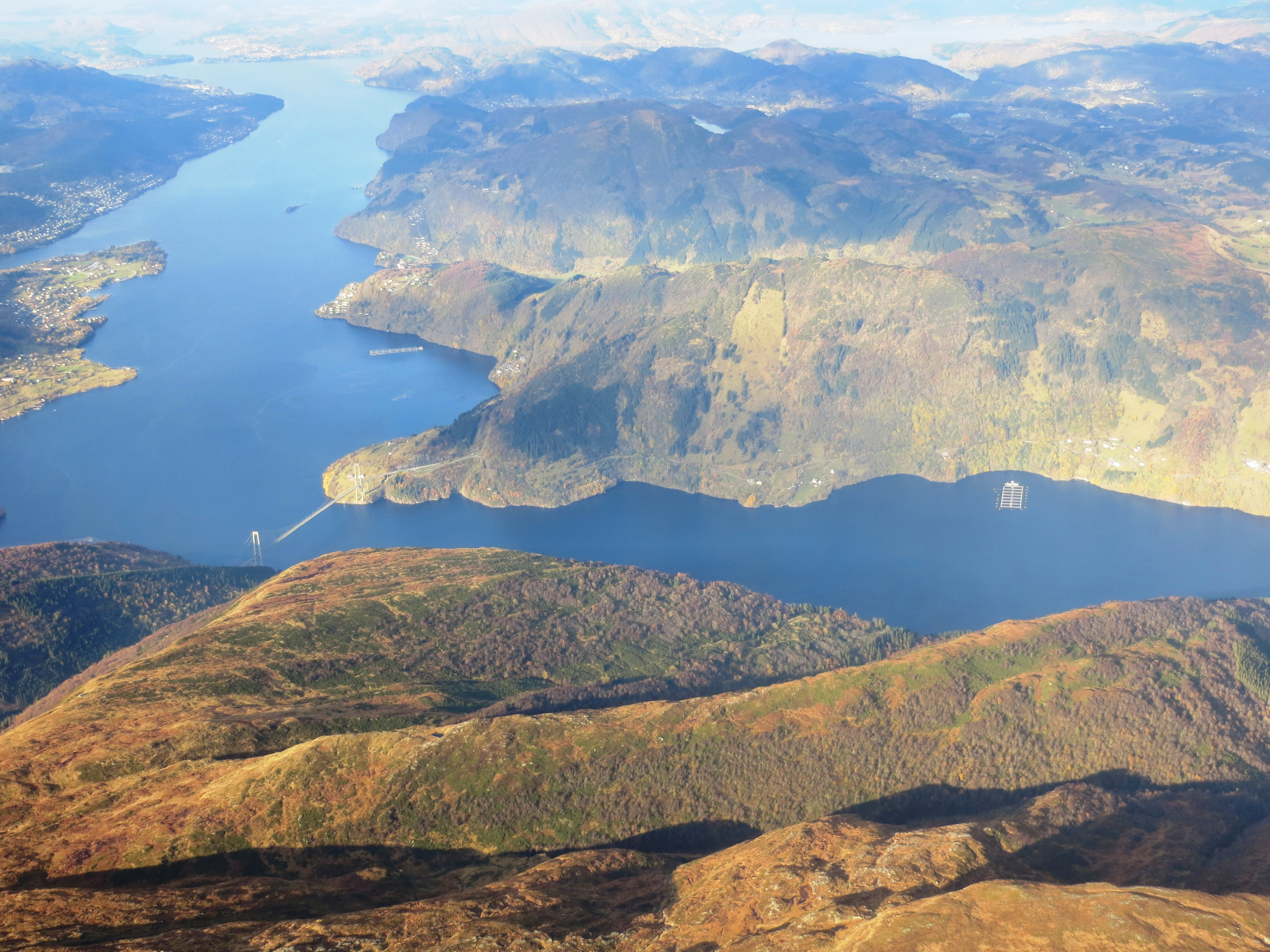
Looking north towards the Osterfjorden
