= Åsane =

Borough of Bergen, Norway

Åsane bydel
- Borough
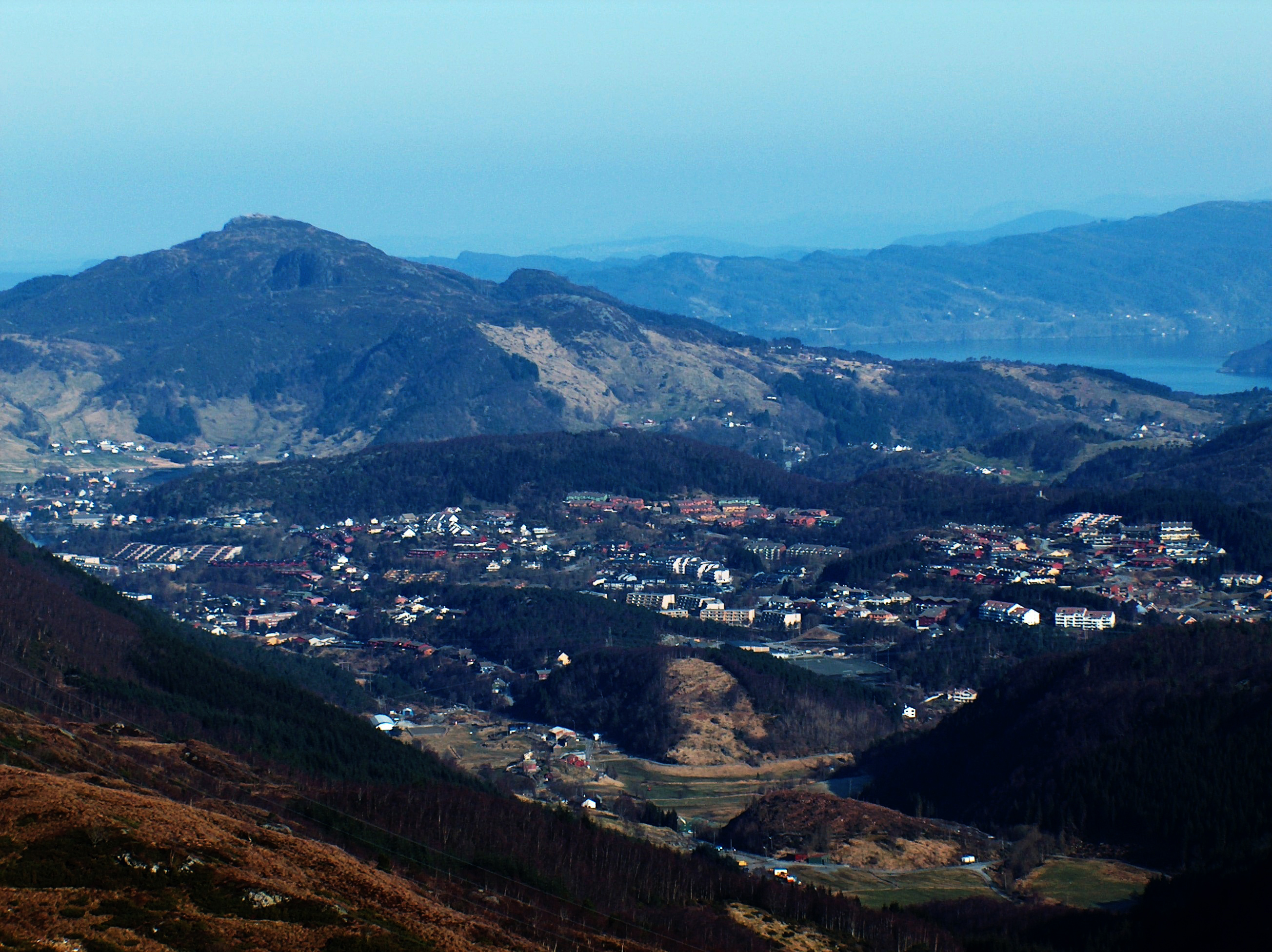

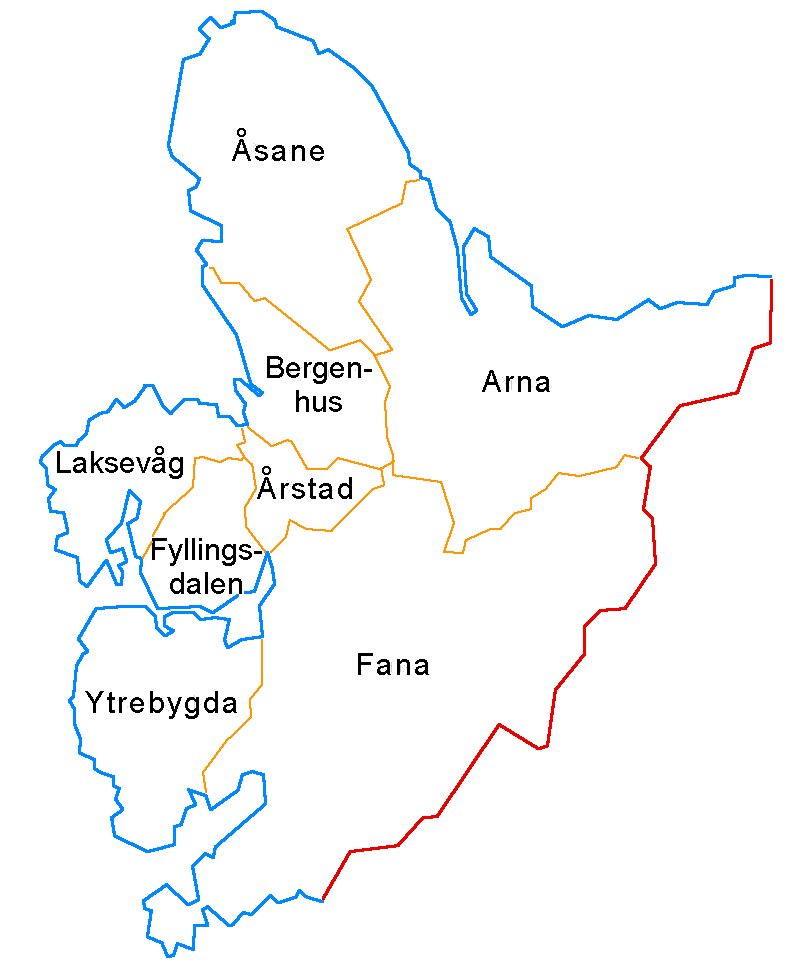
- Map of the 8 boroughs of the city of Bergen
- Coordinates: 60°27′49″N 05°19′19″E
- Country: Norway
- Region: Western Norway
- County: Vestland
- District: Midhordland
- City: Bergen

Area
  - Total: 68.82 km^{2} (26.57 sq mi)
  - Rank: 3rd
- 15.2% of city

Population (1 January 2014)
  - Total: 40,146
  - Rank: 3rd in city
  - Density: 583.3/km^{2} (1,511/sq mi)
- 14.8% of total
- Time zone: UTC+01:00 (CET)
  - Summer (DST): UTC+02:00 (CEST)
- ISO 3166 code: NO-120108

Åsane is a borough of the city of Bergen in Vestland county, Norway. The borough makes up the northern part of the city, north of the city centre.

Åsane is connected to downtown Bergen by the E16/E39 highway. The E16 highway continues on through Åsane to the southeast to the neighboring borough of Arna. The E39 highway continues north through Åsane to the Nordhordland Bridge and then on to the northern municipalities in Vestland county. There are plans to shorten the E39 highway through Åsane, including the construction of two tunnels: Eikås Tunnel (start of construction 2010) and the Nyborg Tunnel (still in the planning stages). Most buses passing through Åsane stop at the centrally located Åsane Terminal.

== History ==
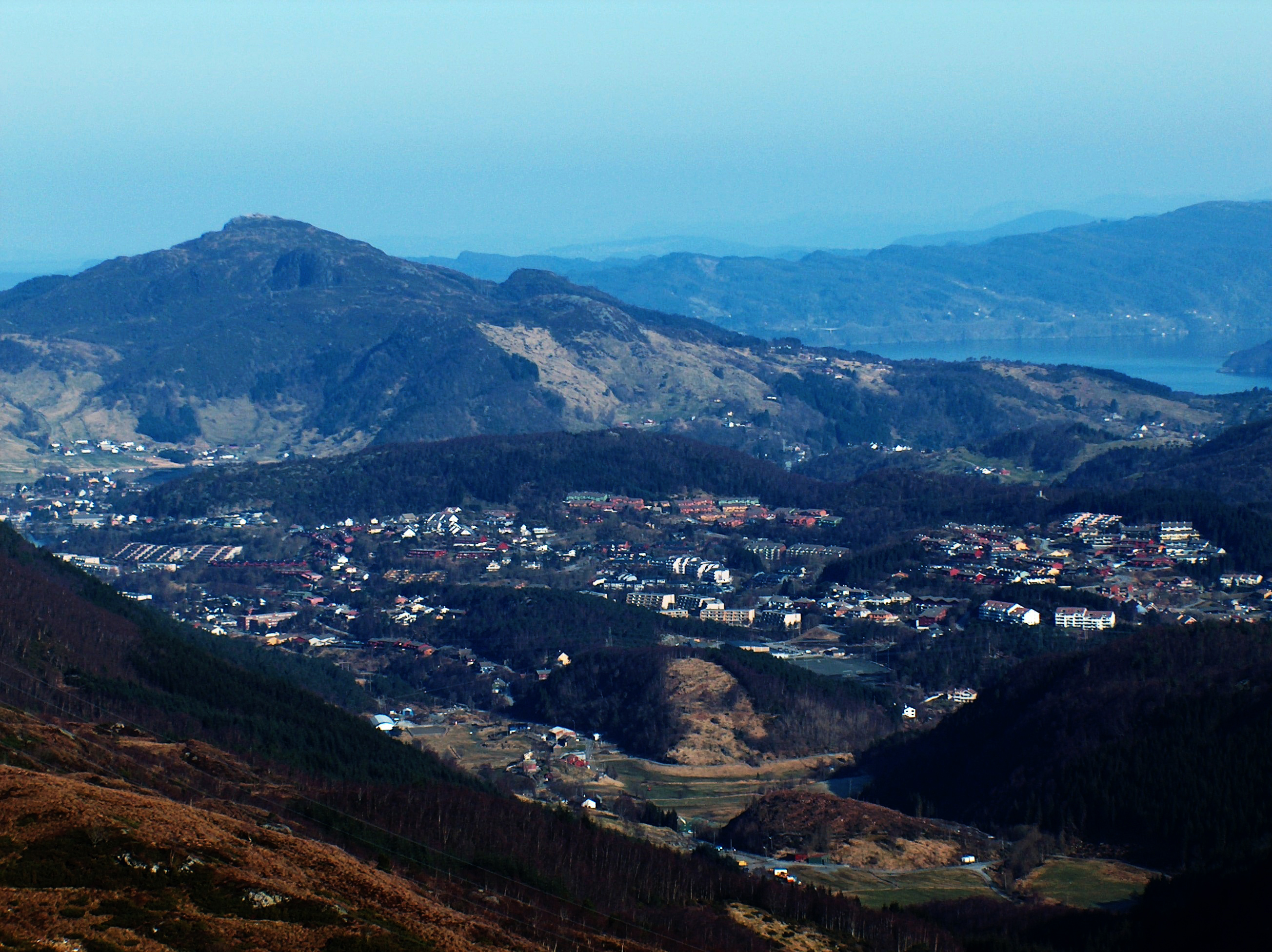
View of Åsane

The area that is now the borough of Åsane was historically called Aasene and it was a parish in the large Hamre Municipality from 1838 until 1 January 1904, when it was separated from Hamre Municipality to become the new Åsane Municipality. The new Åsane Municipality existed from then until 1 January 1972 when it was merged into Bergen Municipality (along with the neighboring Arna Municipality, Fana Municipality, and Laksevåg Municipality). The Åsane area was primarily an agricultural area until the 1960s-1970s when it was built up into a suburb of the city of Bergen. Centrally located in Åsane are the Gullgruven and Åsane Storsenter shopping centres, including a large IKEA store. Bergen Trotting track and Eikås Motorsport Centre are located at Haukås. The Bergen Jail is located at Hylkje in Åsane.

== Geography ==
Åsane lies on a peninsula surrounded by the Byfjorden, Salhusfjorden, and Sørfjorden. The 486-metre (1,594 ft) tall mountain Veten is located in the central part of the peninsula.

=== Villages and neighborhoods ===
The borough is somewhat rural in nature with several large developed villages and neighborhoods separated by forested mountains. Some of the larger village areas include Eidsvåg, Tertnes, Flaktveit, Hordvik and Hylkje.

== Culture and sport ==
Åsane has produced two well-known bands, Salhuskvintetten and Vinskvetten, formerly known as "Salhusvinskvetten". Kurt Nilsen's former band Breed is also from Åsane.

Åsane Fotball (soccer) is Norway's largest sports club. Its senior team plays in the second division.

Tertnes (part of Åsane) handball team, are one of the best handball teams in Norway, and are currently playing in the elite division.

== Notable people ==
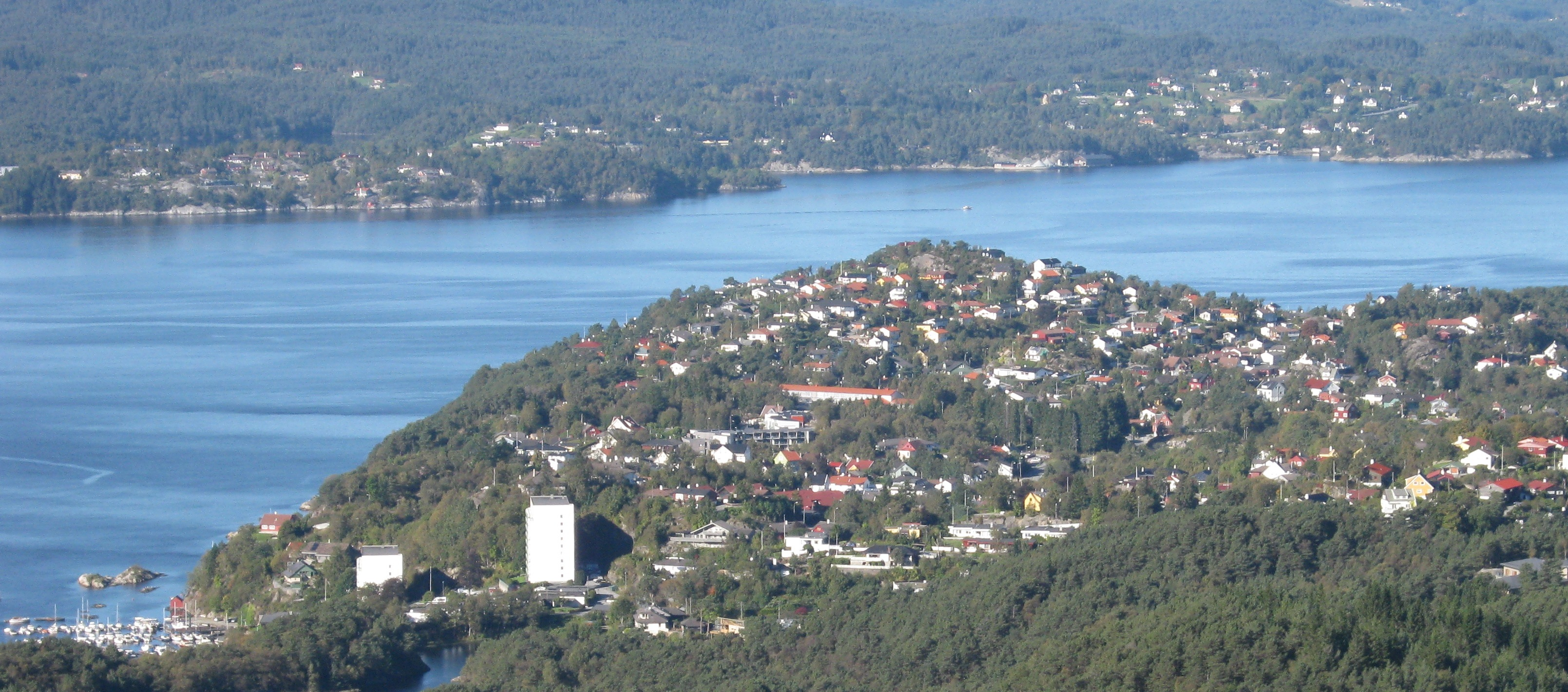
View of Tertnes (foreground)

- Andreas Bakkerud (1991), racing driver
- Roald Bruun-Hansen (1962), footballer, Sports Manager SK Brann, former manager The Football Association of Norway (NFF)
- Mette Davidsen (1976), handball player
- Trude Gundersen (1977), Olympic silver medal winner in taekwondo
- Helge Haugen (1982), footballer
- Heikki Holmås (1972), politician
- Stig Holmås (1946), author
- Helge Jordal (1946), actor
- Kurt Nilsen (1978), musician and winner of Idol (Norway) and World Idol
- Nathalie Nordnes (1984), musician
- Arne Sandstø (1966), football coach
- Kenneth Storvik (1972), footballer
- Anders Styve (1974), boxer
- Alex Marcel Valencia (1979), footballer
- Lars Vaular (1984), rapper
