= Hylkje =

- Neighborhood in Bergen
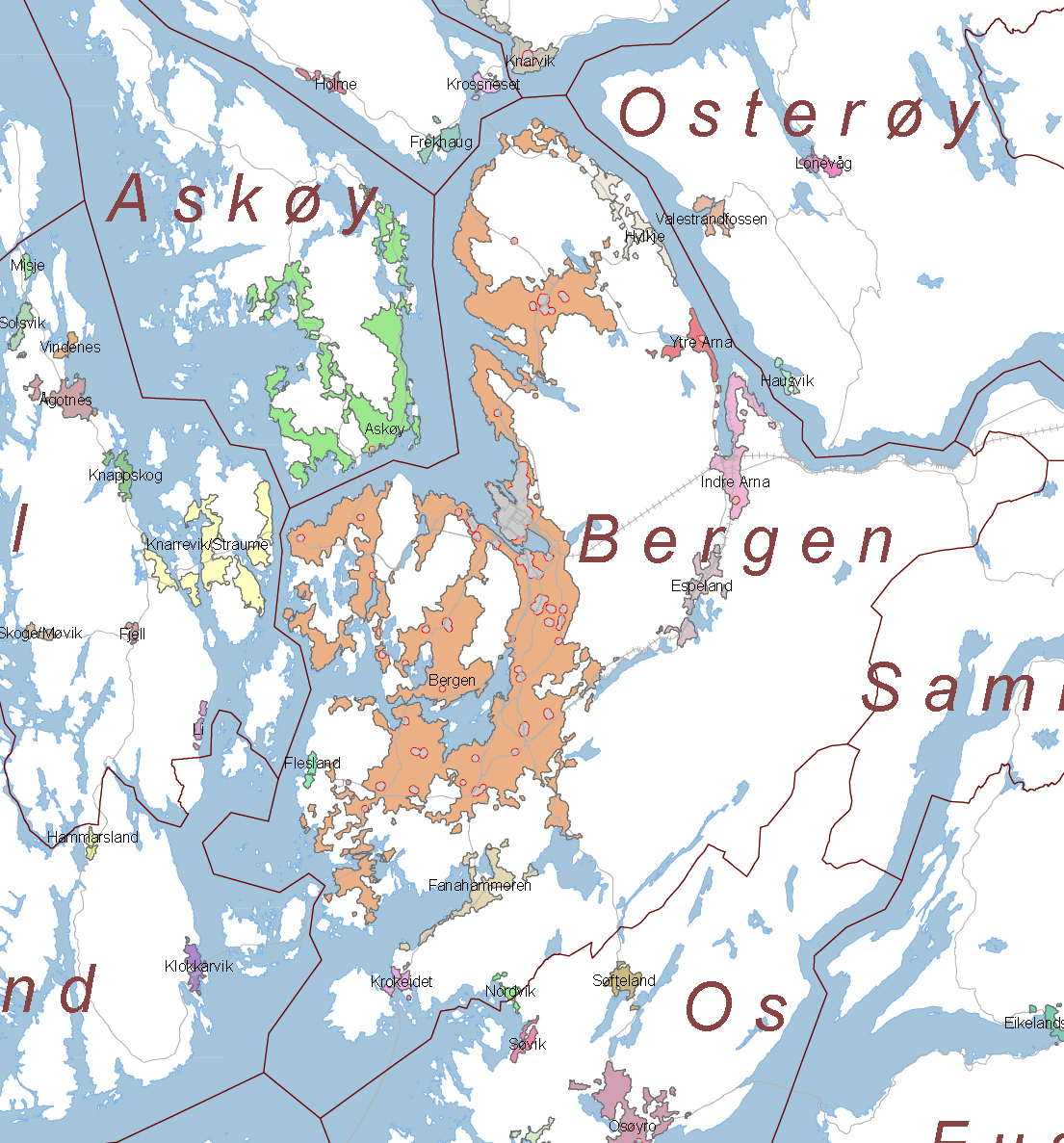
- Location of the neighborhood
- Interactive map of Hylkje
- Coordinates: 60.5110°N 5.3503°E
- Country: Norway
- Region: Western Norway
- County: Vestland
- Municipality: Bergen
- Borough: Åsane

Area
  - Total: 2.97 km^{2} (1.15 sq mi)
- Elevation: 17 m (56 ft)

Population (2012)
  - Total: 2,277
  - Density: 767/km^{2} (1,990/sq mi)
- Time zone: UTC+01:00 (CET)
  - Summer (DST): UTC+02:00 (CEST)

Hylkje is a village in the borough of Åsane in Bergen Municipality in Vestland county, Norway. The village lies in the northeastern part of the municipality, along the Sørfjorden. The European route E39 runs through Hylkje.

The 2.97-square-kilometre (730-acre) village has a population (2012) of 2,277 and a population density of 767 inhabitants per square kilometre (1,990/sq mi). Since 2013, the village population statistics have no longer been tracked because the village is now included in the population statistics for the city of Bergen.
