= Stamneshella =

Village in Vaksdal Municipality, Norway

Stamneshella Stamnes
- Village of Stamnes
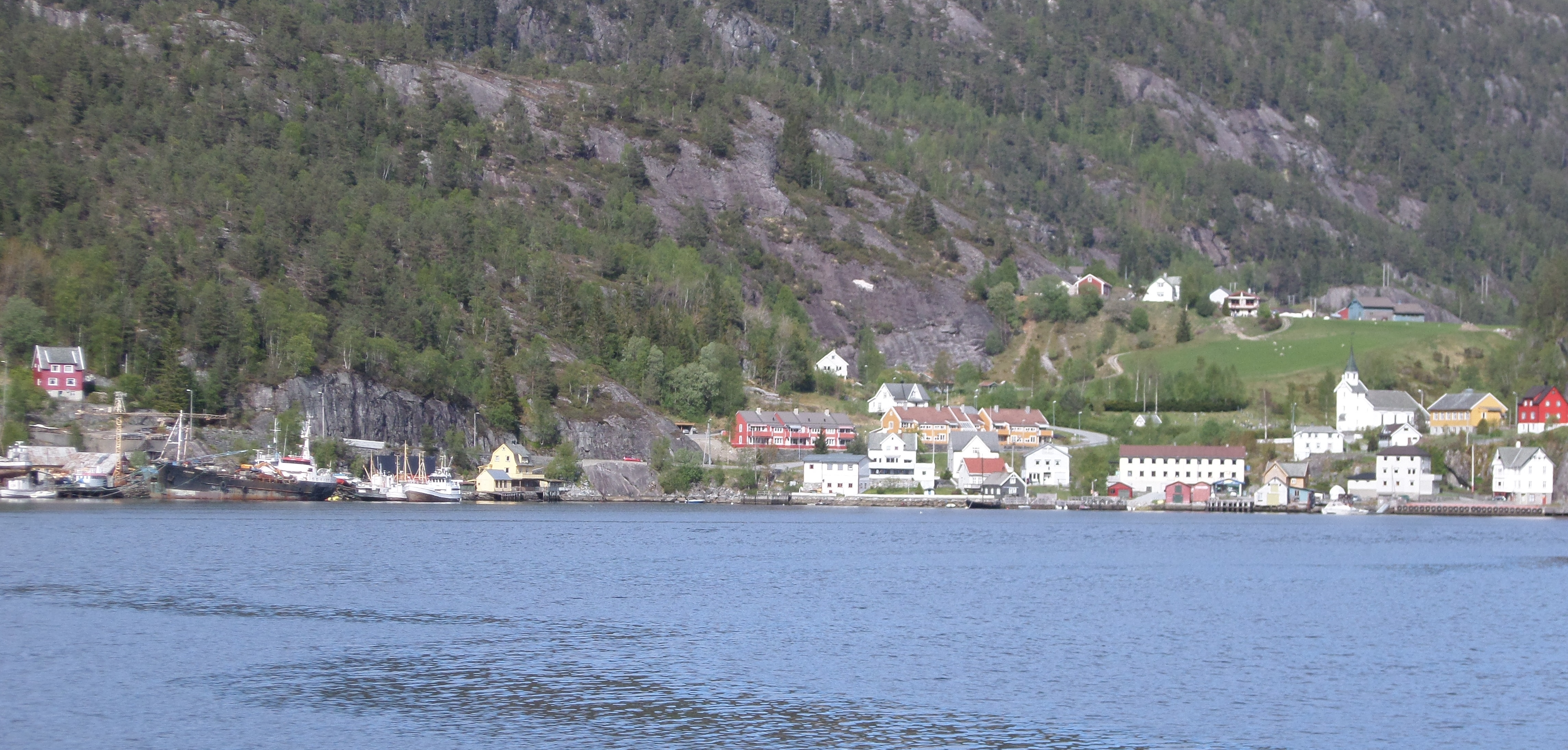
- View of the village
- Interactive map of Stamneshella
- Coordinates: 60.6646°N 5.74891°E
- Country: Norway
- Region: Western Norway
- County: Vestland
- District: Nordhordland
- Municipality: Vaksdal Municipality
- Elevation: 15 m (49 ft)
- Time zone: UTC+01:00 (CET)
  - Summer (DST): UTC+02:00 (CEST)
- Post Code: 5727 Stamnes

Stamneshella or Stamnes is a village in Vaksdal Municipality in Vestland county, Norway. It is located along the northern part of the Veafjorden, at the entrance to the Vikafjorden.

There is a small bridge over the Vikafjorden on the eastern end of the village. It connects to a small residential area on the other side of the fjord that is surrounded by mountains and the fjord. About 1 kilometre (0.62 mi) northwest of the village lies the Kallestadsundet Bridge, which connects the mainland to the island of Osterøy, across the Veafjorden.

The village is an old church site, with records showing a church in this village dating back to the early 14th century. The present Stamnes Church was built in 1861. The village also has a shop, a daycare centre, and a preschool.
