= Landegode Lighthouse =

Coastal lighthouse in Bodø, Norway

Landegode Lighthouse Landegode fyrstasjon
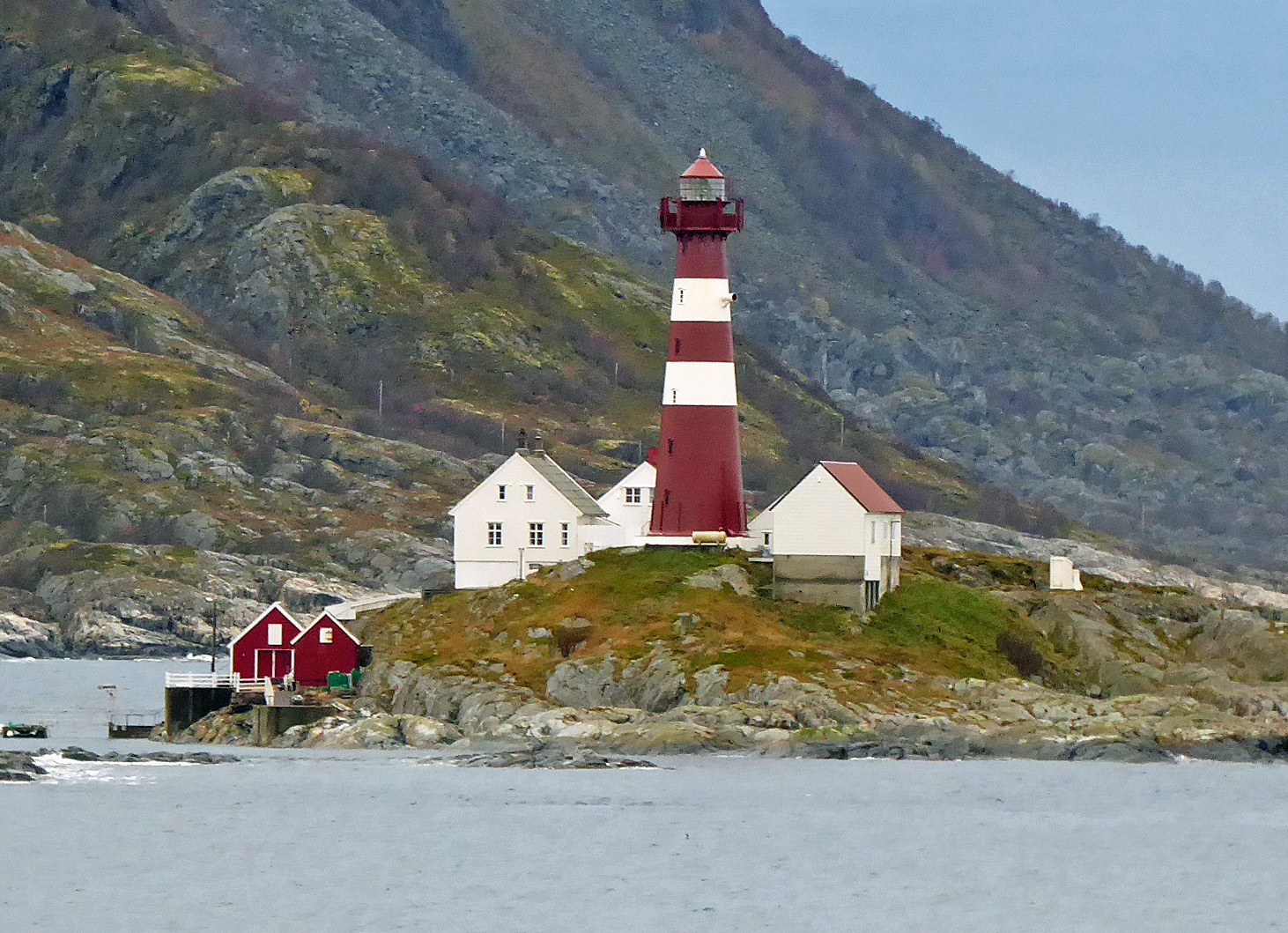
- View of the lighthouse
- Location of the lighthouse
- Location: Nordland, Norway
- Coordinates: 67°26′53″N 14°22′51″E

Tower
- Constructed: 1902
- Construction: cast iron
- Automated: 1988
- Height: 29 metres (95 ft)
- Shape: cylindrical
- Markings: red with 2 white stripes
- Operator: Skagen Hotel
- Heritage: cultural heritage preservation in Norway
- Racon: G

Light
- Focal height: 40.8 metres (134 ft)
- Intensity: 1,460,000 candela
- Range: 16 nmi (30 km; 18 mi)
- Characteristic: Fl(3) W 40s, Oc(2) R 8s
- Norway no.: 704500

Landegode Lighthouse (Norwegian: Landegode fyr) is a coastal lighthouse in Bodø Municipality in Nordland county, Norway. It is located on the small island of Eggløysa just north of Landegode, about 18 kilometres (11 mi) north of the town of Bodø and about 18 kilometres (11 mi) southwest of the village of Kjerringøy.

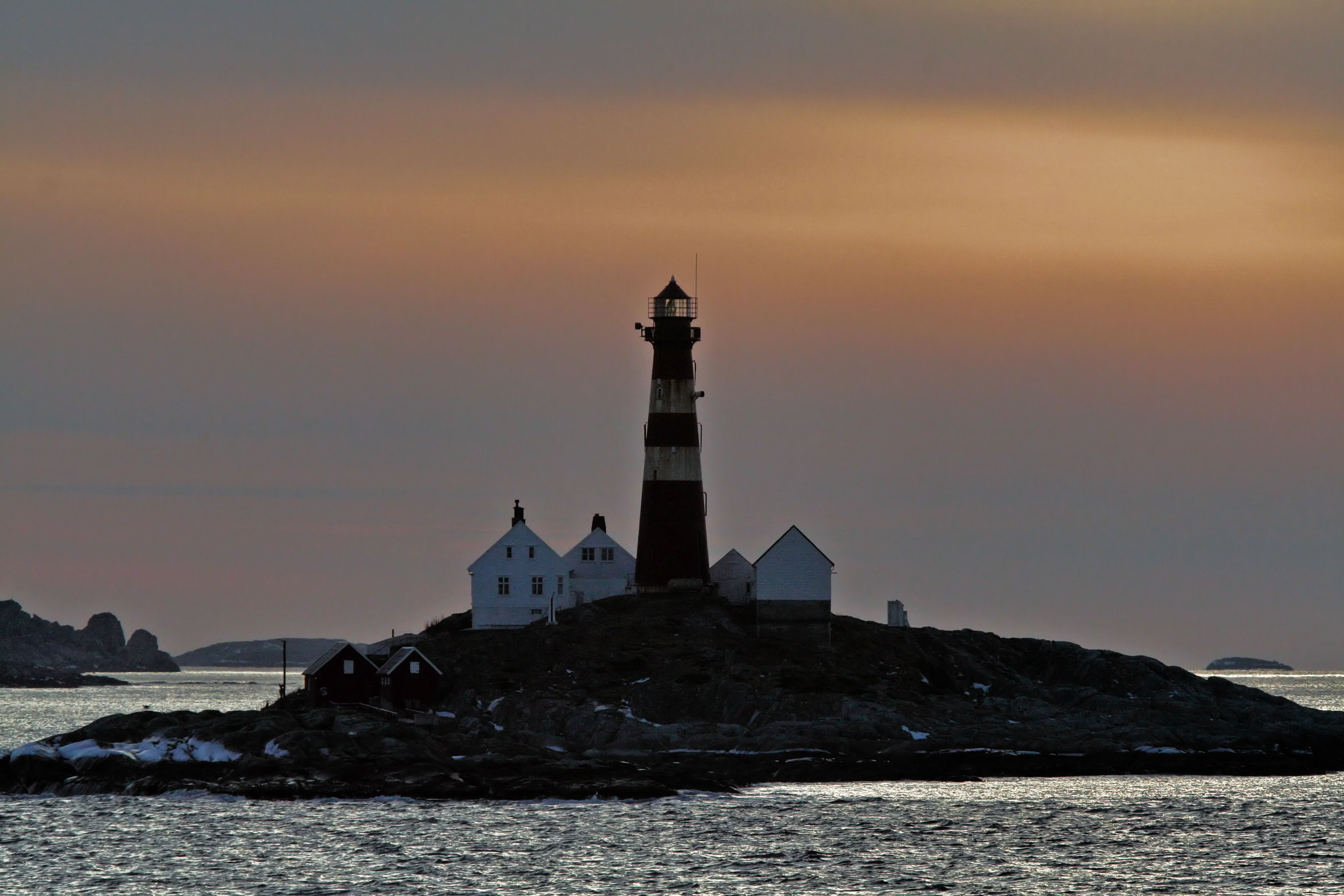
View of the lighthouse

== History ==
The lighthouse was built in 1902 and automated in 1988. The lighthouse was listed as a protected site in 1999. The red, round, iron tower is 29 metres (95 ft) tall and it has two white horizontal stripes painted on the tower. The 1,460,000-candela light can be seen for about 15 nautical miles (28 km; 17 mi). The light sits at an elevation of 40.8 metres (134 ft) above sea level. It emits three flashes of white light every 40 seconds. The light is active from dusk to dawn from 4 August until 2 May each year. The light is not active in the summer due to the midnight sun in the region.

== See also ==
- Lighthouses in Norway
- List of lighthouses in Norway
