= Veten =

Mountain in Bergen, Norway

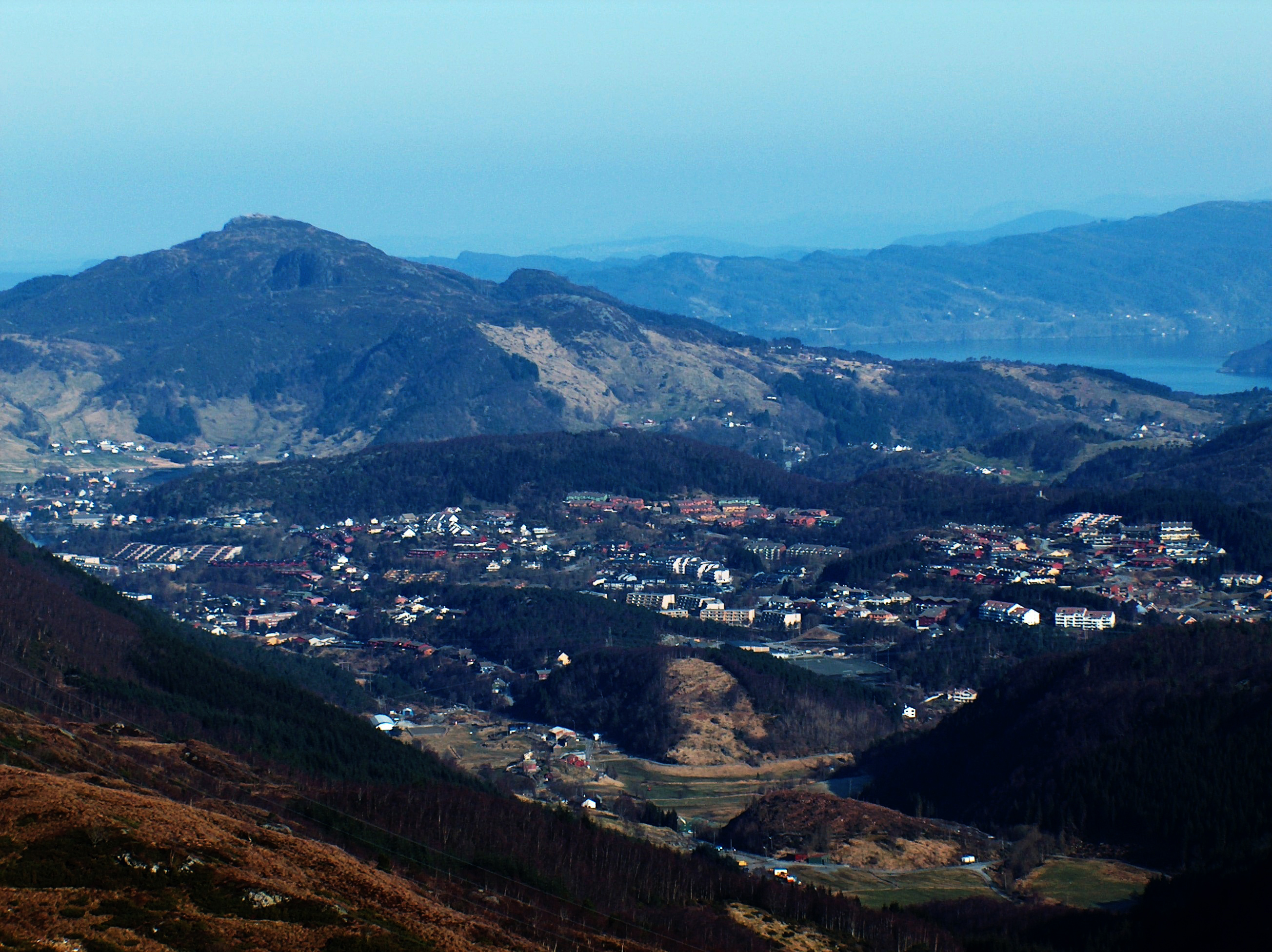
- Veten in Åsane, with Flaktveit in the foreground, seen from Vareggen.

Highest point
- Elevation: 486 m (1,594 ft)
- Prominence: 385 m (1,263 ft)
- Parent peak: Hauggjelsvarden
- Isolation: 8.6 km (5.3 mi)
- Coordinates: 60°30′06″N 5°19′16″E

Geography
- Location: Vestland, Norway

Climbing
- Easiest route: Hiking

Veten is a mountain in Bergen Municipality in Vestland county, Norway. At 486 metres (1,594 ft) above sea level, it is the highest mountain in Åsane borough, and the ninth-highest in Bergen Municipality. It is located about 12 kilometres (7.5 mi) north of the centre of the city of Bergen. The name is an archaic word for "beacon" in Norwegian.

== See also ==
- List of mountains of Norway
