= Vaksdal Church =

Church in Vestland, Norway

- Vaksdal kyrkje
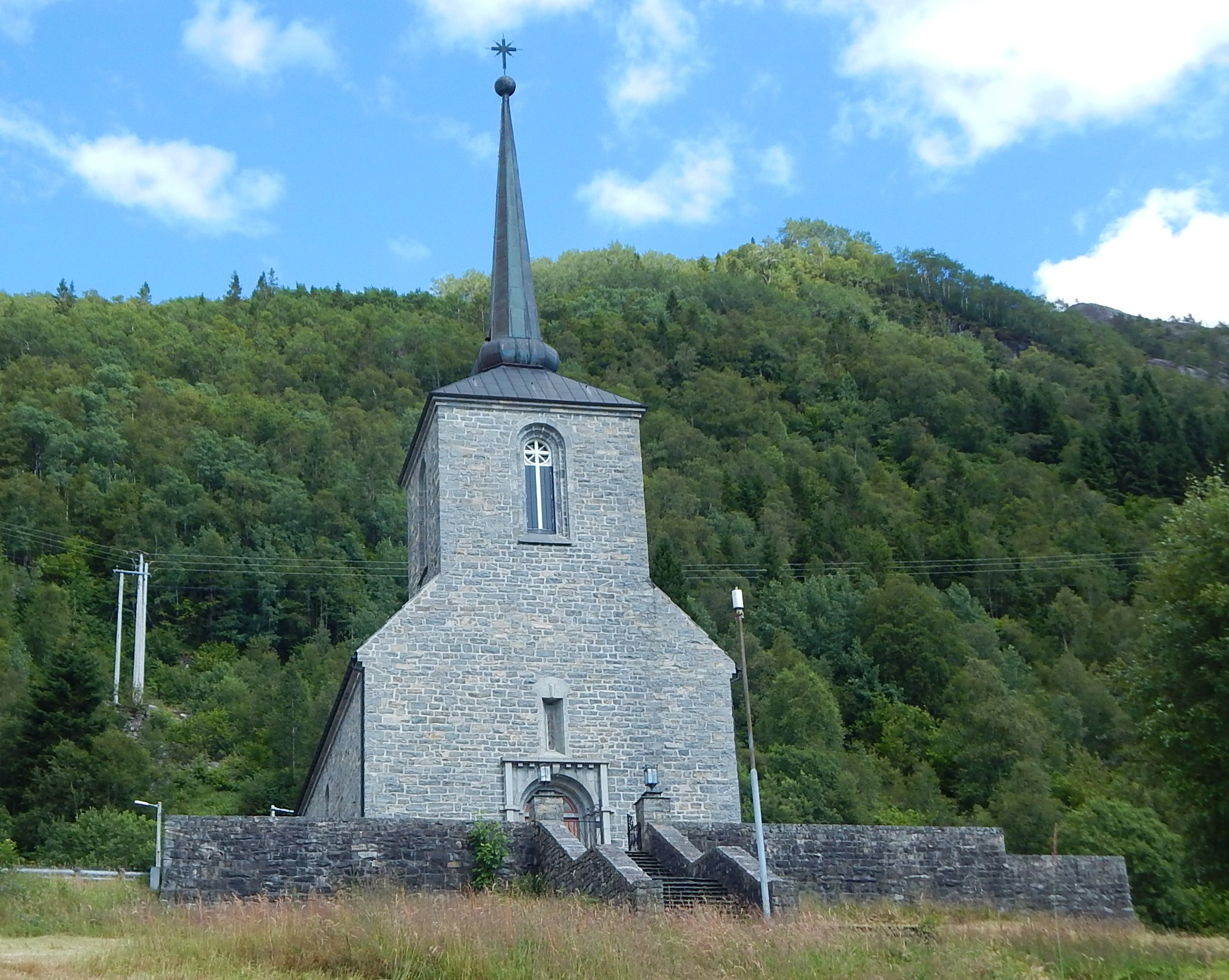
- View of the church
- Vaksdal Church
- 60°28′29″N 5°44′39″E
- Location: Vaksdal, Vestland
- Country: Norway
- Denomination: Church of Norway
- Churchmanship: Evangelical Lutheran

History
- Status: Parish church
- Founded: 1933
- Consecrated: 7 April 1933

Architecture
- Functional status: Active
- Architect: Ole Landmark
- Architectural type: Long church
- Completed: 1933 (93 years ago)

Specifications
- Capacity: 300
- Materials: Stone

Administration
- Diocese: Bjørgvin bispedømme
- Deanery: Hardanger og Voss prosti
- Parish: Vaksdal
- Norwegian Cultural Heritage Site
- Type: Church
- Status: Not protected
- ID: 85740

Vaksdal Church (Norwegian: Vaksdal kyrkje) is a parish church of the Church of Norway in Vaksdal Municipality in Vestland county, Norway. It is located in the village of Vaksdal. It is the church for the Vaksdal parish which is part of the Hardanger og Voss prosti (deanery) in the Diocese of Bjørgvin. The gray, stone church was built in a long church design in 1933 using plans drawn up by the architect Ole Landmark. The church seats about 300 people.

== History ==
Historically, the Vaksdal area was part of the Bruvik Church parish. In 1933, the Vaksdal area was separated to become its own parish, so a new church was built. Ole Landmark was hired to design the building. The new church was consecrated on 7 April 1933.

== See also ==
- List of churches in Bjørgvin
