= Stamnes Church =

Church in Vestland, Norway

- Stamnes kyrkje
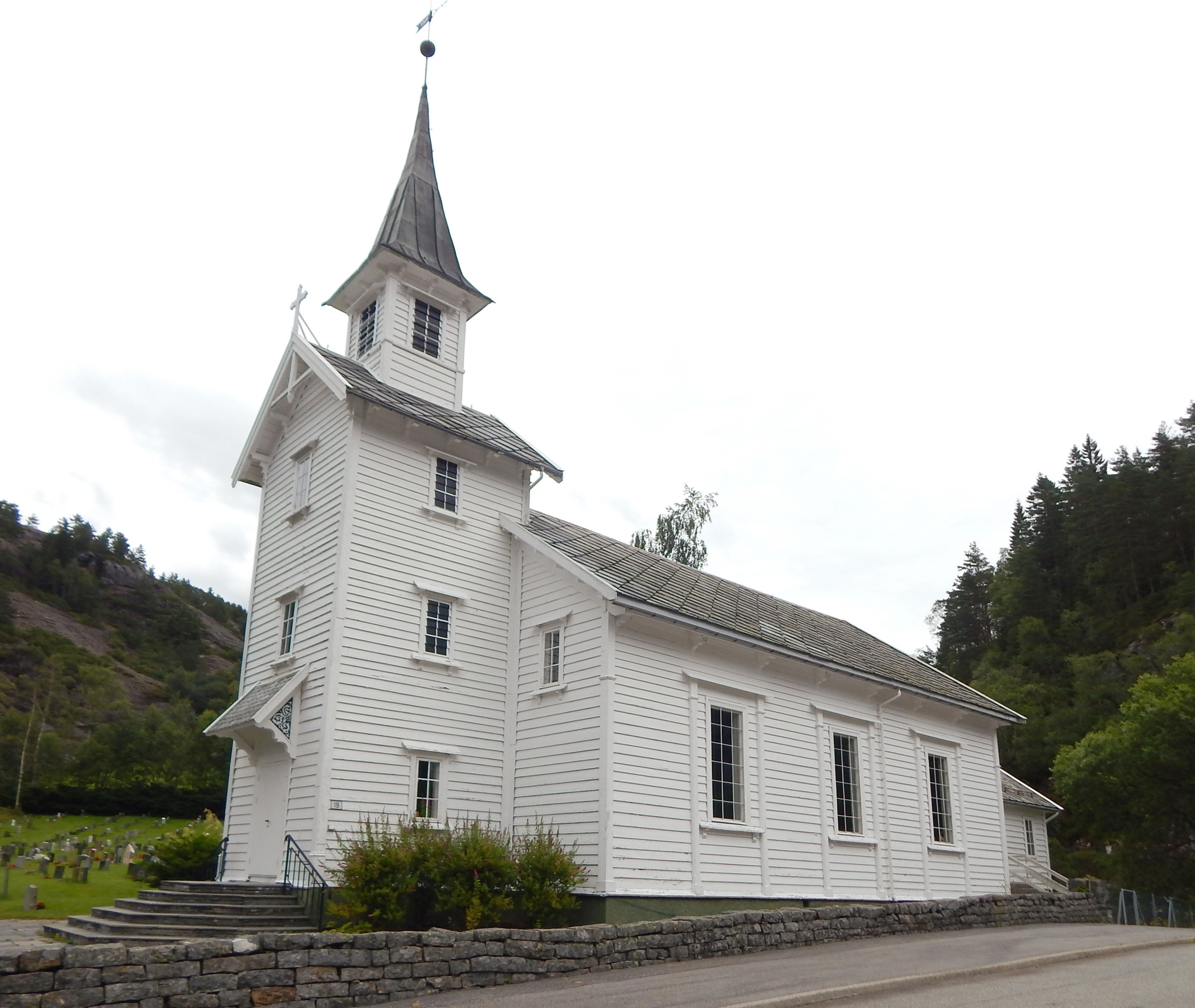
- View of the church
- Stamnes Church
- 60°39′51″N 5°44′59″E
- Location: Vaksdal, Vestland
- Country: Norway
- Denomination: Church of Norway
- Previous denomination: Catholic Church
- Churchmanship: Evangelical Lutheran

History
- Status: Parish church
- Founded: 13th century
- Consecrated: 20 Oct 1861

Architecture
- Functional status: Active
- Architect: Peter Høier Holtermann
- Architectural type: Long church
- Completed: 1861 (165 years ago)

Specifications
- Capacity: 250
- Materials: Wood

Administration
- Diocese: Bjørgvin bispedømme
- Deanery: Hardanger og Voss prosti
- Parish: Stamnes
- Norwegian Cultural Heritage Site
- Type: Church
- Status: Not protected
- ID: 85543

Stamnes Church (Norwegian: Stamnes kyrkje) is a parish church of the Church of Norway in Vaksdal Municipality in Vestland county, Norway. It is located in the village of Stamneshella. It is the church for the Stamnes parish which is part of the Hardanger og Voss prosti (deanery) in the Diocese of Bjørgvin. The white, wooden church was built in a long church design in 1861 using plans drawn up by the architects Peter Høier Holtermann and Jacob Wilhelm Nordan. The church seats about 250 people.

== History ==
The earliest existing historical records of the church date back to the year 1328, but the church was not new that year. The first church in Stamnes was a wooden stave church that was likely built during the 13th century. Very little is known about this church. The church is said to have received a new pulpit in 1582 and chairs around 1590. During the first part of the 1600s, the old stave church was torn down and replaced with a timber-framed long church. In 1687–1689, a new choir had been built for the church, and a total of six new windows had been installed in the choir and nave. According to records, this church had a nave that measured about 11.3 by 7 metres (37 ft × 23 ft) and the choir on the east end of the nave measured about 5 by 5.6 metres (16 ft × 18 ft).

In 1814, this church served as an election church (Norwegian: valgkirke). Together with more than 300 other parish churches across Norway, it was a polling station for elections to the 1814 Norwegian Constituent Assembly which wrote the Constitution of Norway. This was Norway's first national elections. Each church parish was a constituency that elected people called "electors" who later met together in each county to elect the representatives for the assembly that was to meet at Eidsvoll Manor later that year.

By the mid-1800s, the church was too small for the population, and it needed to be enlarged or replaced. In 1861, the old church was torn down and replaced with a present church building. The new building was designed by Peter Høier Holtermann and the architect for the Ministry of Church Affairs, Jacob Wilhelm Nordan, modified the tower before the plans were approved. Nils Mjøs was the construction manager for the project. The new building was consecrated on 20 October 1861. In the 1950s, the church received electric lighting and heating. In 1961, an addition was built just east of the choir containing a sacristy, bathroom, and meeting room.

== See also ==
- List of churches in Bjørgvin
