= Landegode =

Island in Nordland, Norway

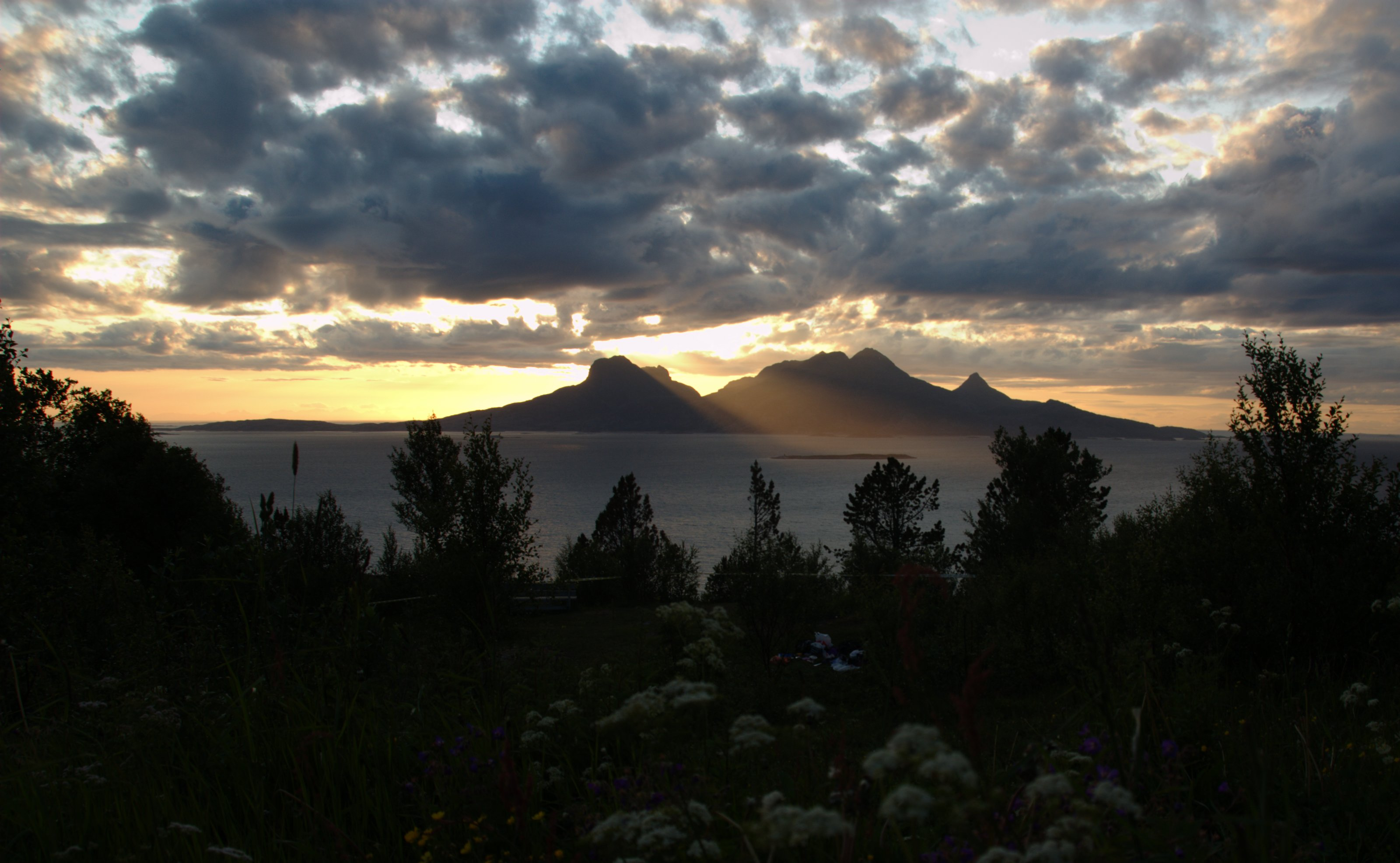
- Interactive map of Landegode

Geography
- Location: Nordland, Norway
- Coordinates: 67.4367°N 14.3714°E
- Area: 30.3 km^{2} (11.7 sq mi)
- Length: 11 km (6.8 mi)
- Width: 5 km (3.1 mi)
- Highest elevation: 802 m (2631 ft)
- Highest point: Rypdalstinden

Administration
- Norway
- County: Nordland
- Municipality: Bodø Municipality

Demographics
- Population: 48 (2017)

Landegode (also written as Landego) is an island in Vestfjorden, just north of Bodø in Nordland county, Norway. The island belongs to Bodø Municipality and has an area of 30.75-square-kilometre (11.87 sq mi). The highest point on the mountainous island is the 802-metre (2,631 ft) tall Rypdalstinden.

The island is located about 10 kilometres (6.2 mi) northwest of the town of Bodø and about 14 kilometres (8.7 mi) east of the Helligvær islands.

Most of the 48 islanders (in 2017) live in the southern village of Fenes. Landegode Church is also located in Fenes. Just off of the north end of the island, there are two lighthouses: Landegode Lighthouse and Bjørnøy Lighthouse.

== See also ==
- List of islands of Norway
