= Kenneth Storvik =

Norwegian footballer (born 1972)

Personal information
- Full name: Kenneth Storvik
- Date of birth: 27 February 1972 (age 54)
- Place of birth: Bergen, Norway
- Height: 1.77 m (5 ft 10 in)
- Position: Midfielder

Senior career*
Years	Team	Apps	(Gls)
- Åsane
1991–1996	Viking		
1996	Lyngby	4	(0)
1997–1999	Helsingborg		
1999–2002	Rosenborg	5	(0)
2003	Brann		
2004	Frem	7	(1)
- * Club domestic league appearances and goals

Kenneth Storvik (born 27 February 1972) is a former football midfielder.

== Career ==
Hailing from Bergen, he started his career in 1991 with Åsane, then moved to Viking and had a spell with Lyngby in 1996. In 1997 moved abroad to Sweden, playing for the club Helsingborg. In 2000, he moved back to Norway and played for Rosenborg, however he only made 5 appearances. In 2003, he spent a season with Brann and in 2004 he played for Danish side Frem.

== Honours ==
Norwegian Premier League winner: 1991
