= Åsane Storsenter =

Shopping centre in Bergen, Norway

Coordinates: 60°27′56.79″N 5°19′27.57″E

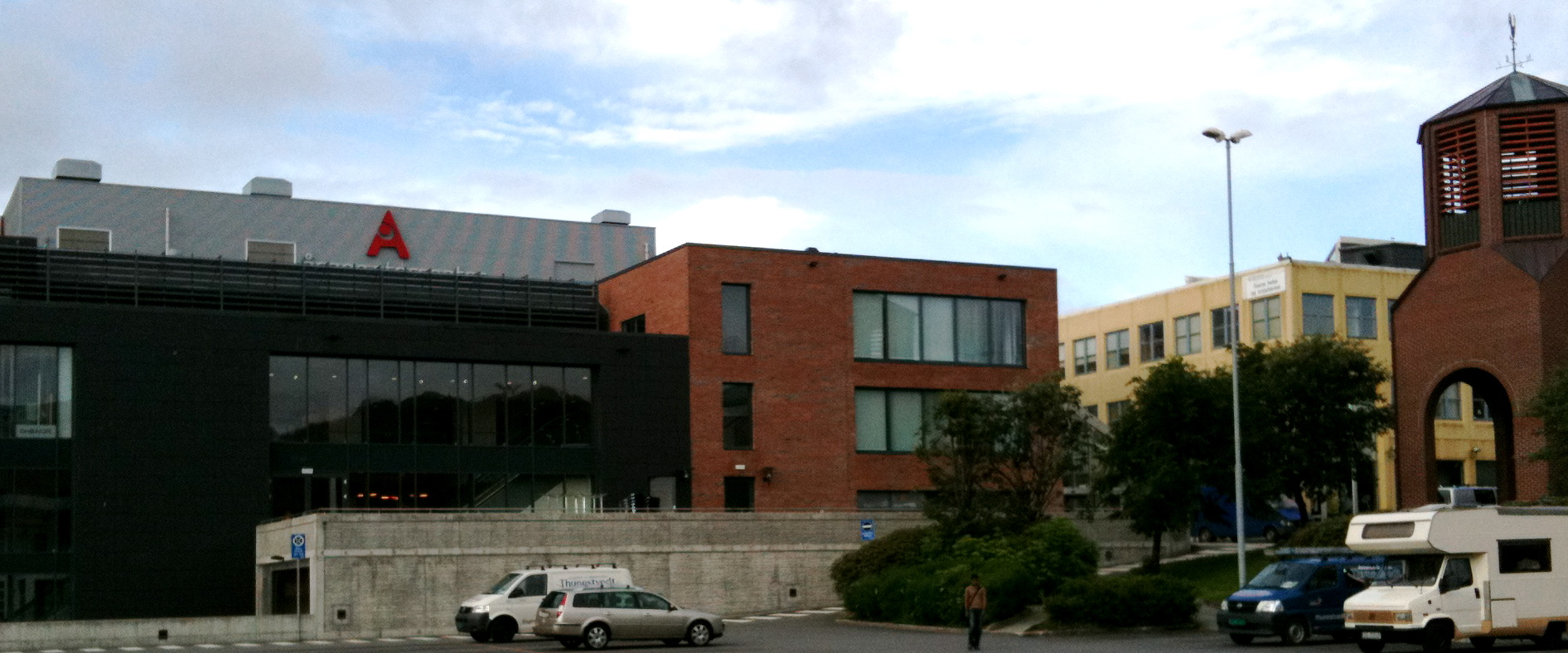
Thon Senter Åsane

Thon Senter Åsane, previously Åsane Storsenter, is a shopping centre in the suburb of Åsane in Bergen, Norway. It was established in 2007 when Arken, owned by Steen & Strøm, and Åsane Senter, owned by Nordea Liv, merged in 2007. In January 2012, it consisted of 138 shops. During 2016, the property was acquired by Olav Thon Eiendomsselskap.

In late February 2026, Åsane Storsenter was renamed to Thon Senter Åsane.
