= Vaksdal (village) =

Village in Vaksdal Municipality, Norway

- Village
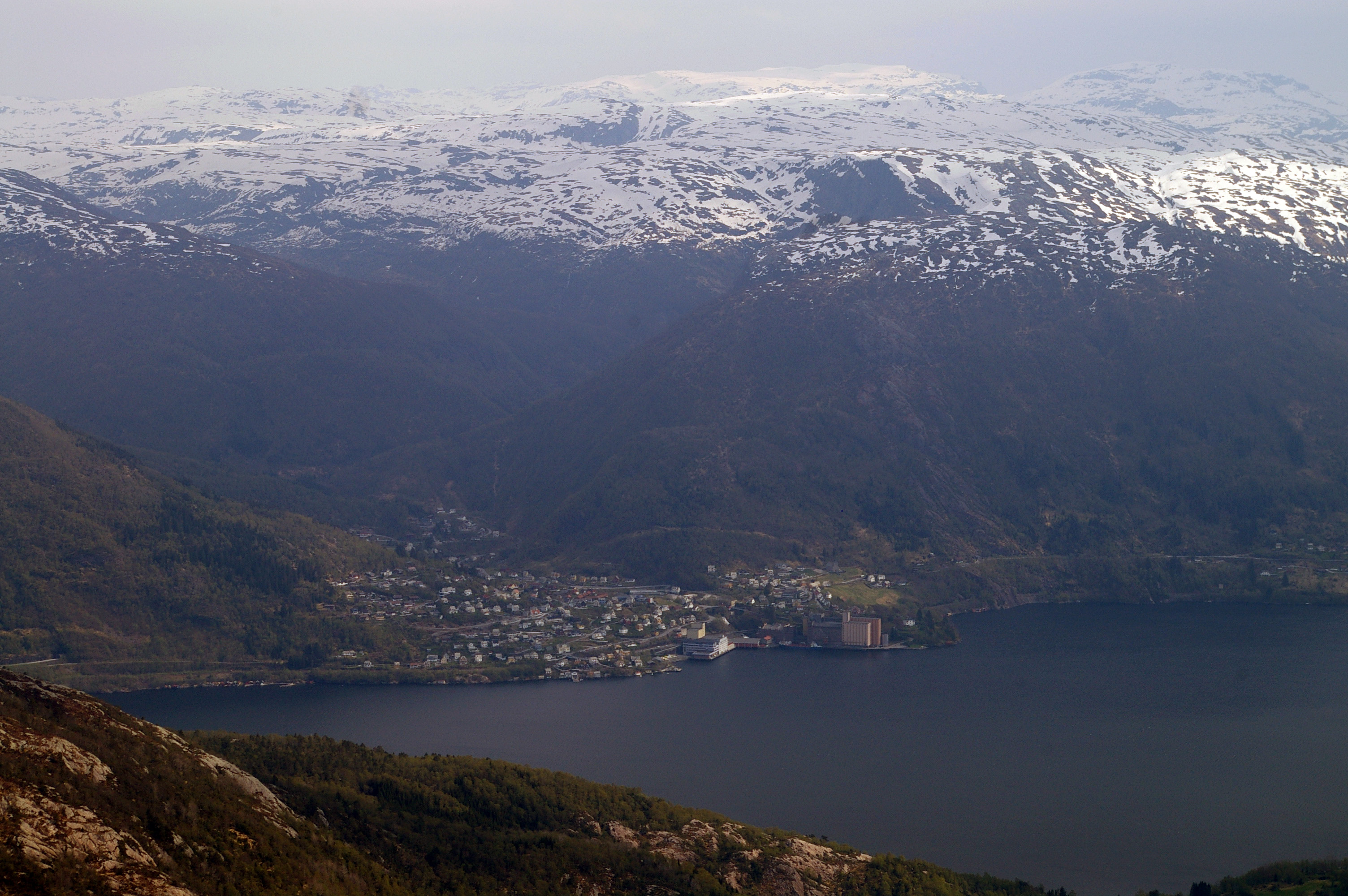
- View of the village, looking south
- Interactive map of Vaksdal
- Coordinates: 60.47903°N 5.73739°E
- Country: Norway
- Region: Western Norway
- County: Vestland
- District: Nordhordland
- Municipality: Vaksdal Municipality

Area
  - Total: 0.69 km^{2} (0.27 sq mi)
- Elevation: 55 m (180 ft)

Population (2025)
  - Total: 941
  - Density: 1,364/km^{2} (3,530/sq mi)
- Time zone: UTC+01:00 (CET)
  - Summer (DST): UTC+02:00 (CEST)
- Post Code: 5725 Vaksdal

Vaksdal is a village in Vaksdal Municipality in Vestland county, Norway. The village is located on the southern shore of the Veafjorden, across the fjord from the village of Bruvik which sits on the island of Osterøy.

The European route E16 highway goes through the village, as does the Bergen Line, which stops at the Vaksdal Station. Vaksdal Church was built in the village in 1933.

The 0.69-square-kilometre (170-acre) village has a population (2025) of 941 and a population density of 1,364 inhabitants per square kilometre (3,530/sq mi).

== Media gallery ==
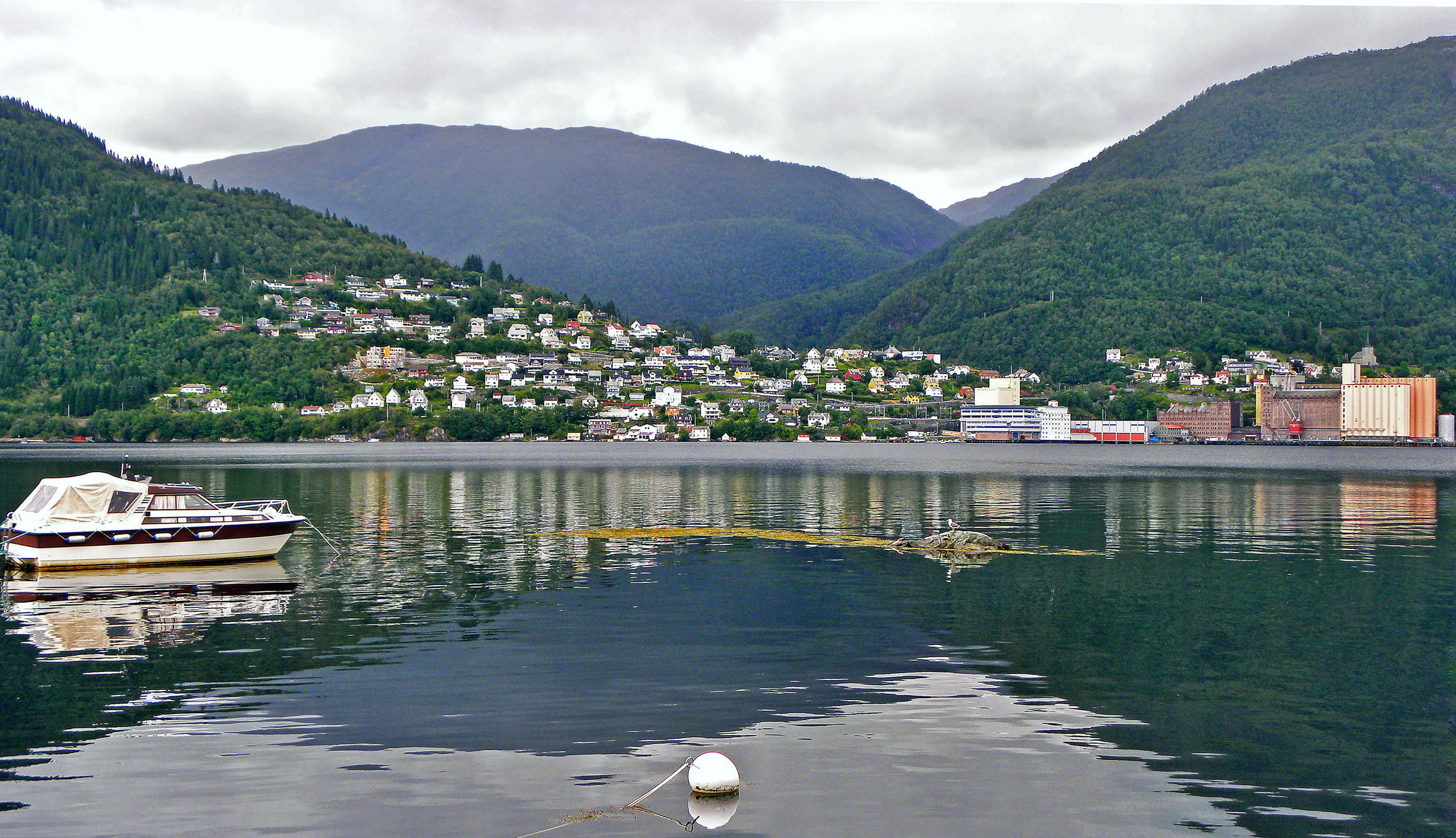
View of the village from across the fjord

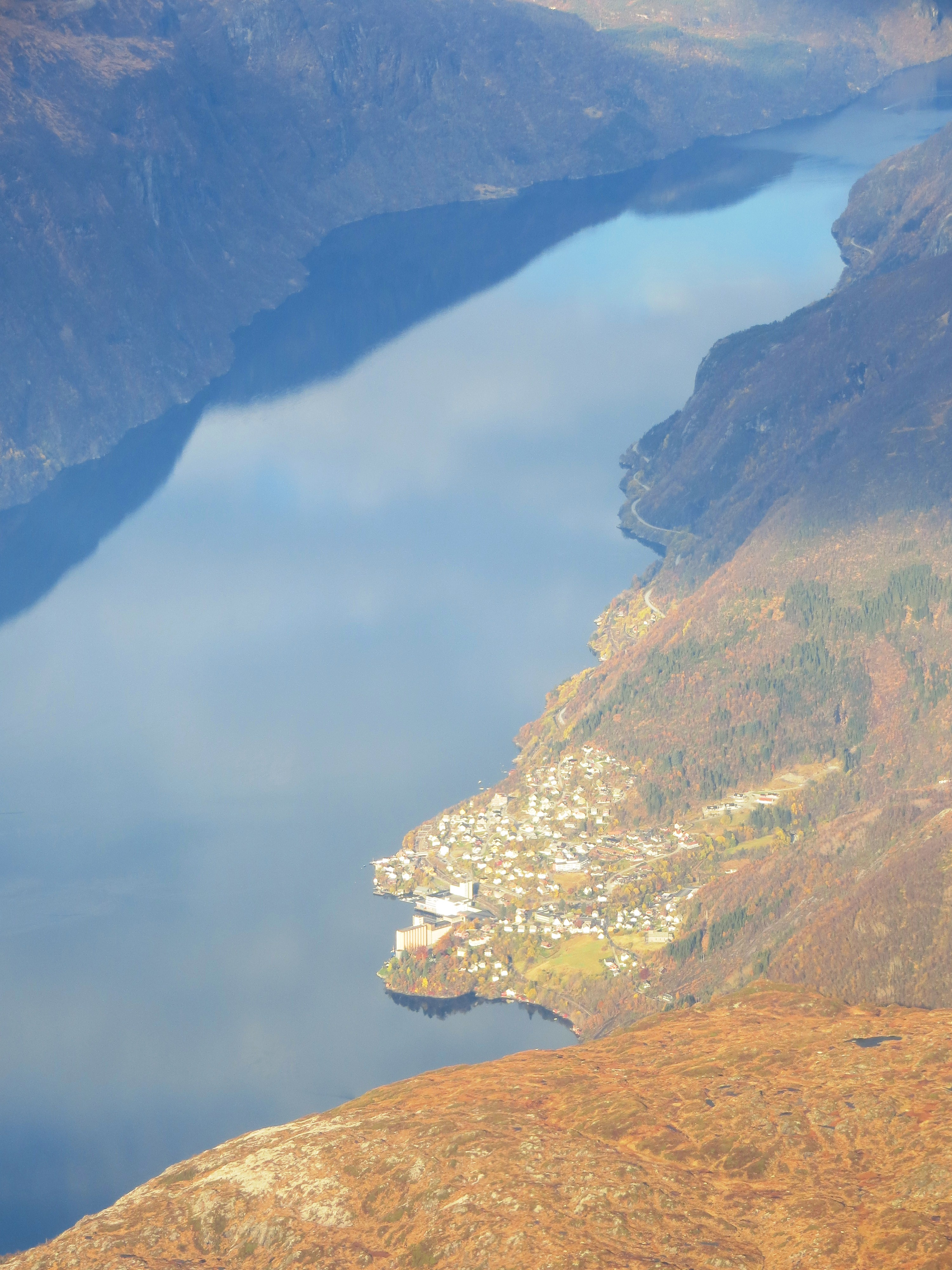
Vaksdal, looking northeast along the Veafjorden

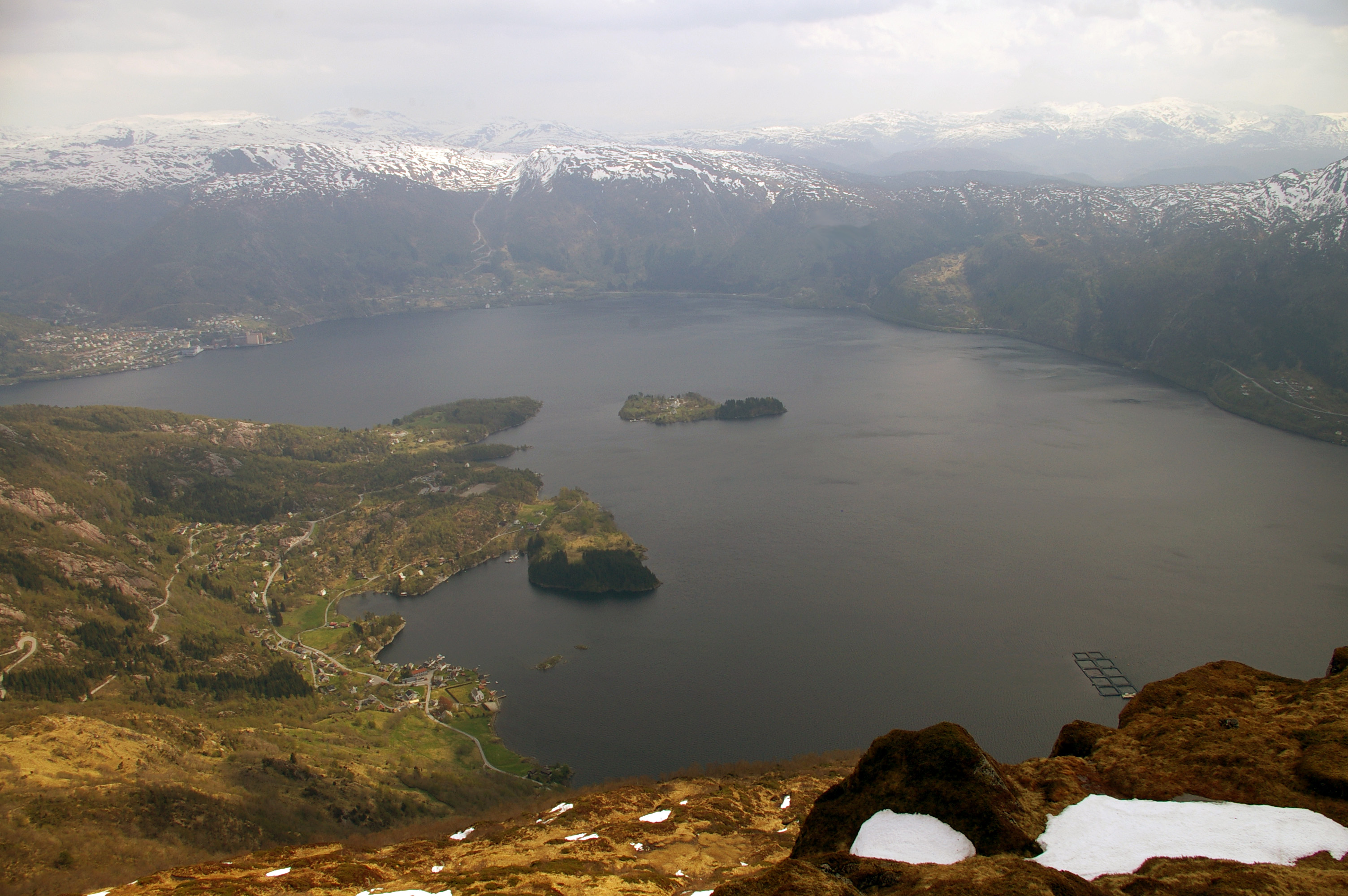
The village of Bruvik, with Vaksdal in the back left of the picture
