= Lavik =

Lavik may refer to:

== People ==
- Abu Bakr Lavik, a ruler of Ghazna (in modern Afghanistan) from the Lawik dynasty
- Andreas Lavik (1854–1918), a Norwegian revivalist, temperance advocate, magazine editor, farmer, headmaster, and politician
- Andres Lavik (1852–1941), a Norwegian farmer and politician for the Liberal Party
- Dore Lavik (1863–1908), a Norwegian actor and theatre director
- Erin Lavik (born 1973), an American bio-engineer
- Herbrand Lavik (1901–1965), a Norwegian journalist, short story writer, novelist, poet, translator, and theatre critic
- Jadon Lavik (born 1978), an American contemporary Christian music singer-songwriter
- Johannes Lavik (1856–1929), a Norwegian journalist and newspaper editor
- Johannes Lavik (born 1883) (1883–1952), a Norwegian jurist, journalist, and newspaper editor
- Nils Lavik (1884–1966), a Norwegian politician for the Christian Democratic Party
- Nils Johan Lavik (1931–2011), a Norwegian psychiatrist and Professor of Psychiatry at the University of Oslo
- Rudy Lavik (1892–1979), an American coach and college athletics administrator
- Tonje Lavik Pederssen (born 1996), a Norwegian politician

== Places ==
- Lavik (village), a village in Høyanger Municipality in Vestland county, Norway
- Lavik Municipality, a former municipality in the old Sogn og Fjordane county, Norway
- Lavik Church, a church in Høyanger Municipality in Vestland county, Norway
