= Svein Blindheim =

Norwegian military officer (1916–2013)

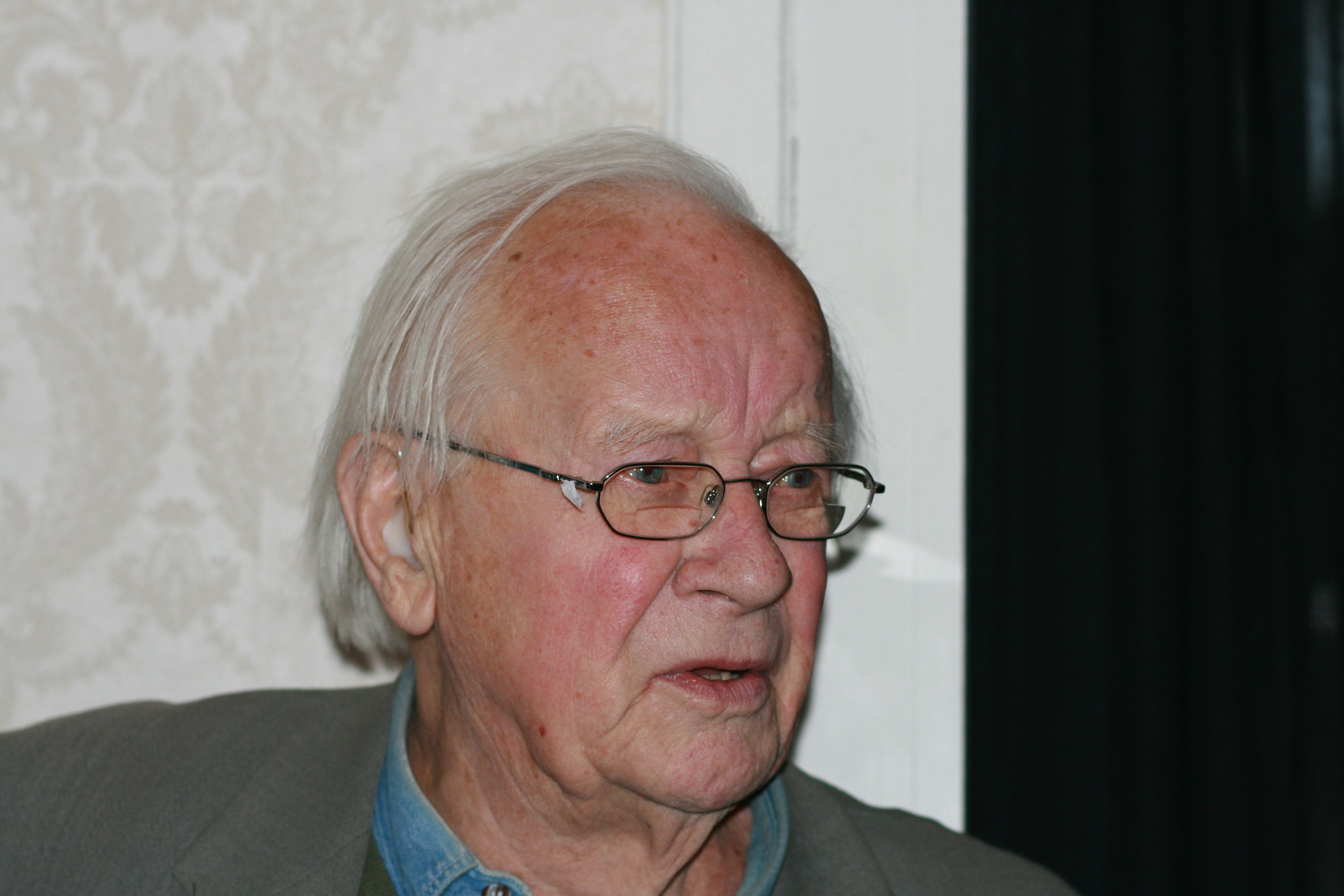
- Born: 26 August 1916; Voss Municipality, Norway
- Died: 17 March 2013 (aged 96)
- Occupation: Military officer
- Spouse: Joan Mary Tindale (m. 1945–1970)
- Parents: Severin Nicolai Blindheim (father); Ragna Lavik (mother)
- Relatives: maternal grandson of Andres Lavik; grandnephew and nephew of Andreas, Dore, Johannes and Nils Lavik
- Awards: War Cross with Sword

Svein Lavik Blindheim (29 August 1916 – 17 March 2013) was a Norwegian military officer, known for his resistance work during World War II.

== Personal life ==
Blindheim was born in Voss Municipality as a son of educator Severin Nicolai Blindheim (1890–1925) and teacher Ragna Lavik (1891–1976). He was a maternal grandson of Andres Lavik, and thus a grandnephew of Andreas, Dore and Johannes Lavik and nephew of Nils Lavik. From 1945 to 1970, he was married to British citizen Joan Mary Tindale.

== Career ==
Before the Second World War he took education in Askim Municipality, and competed in middle-distance running and skiing for the local sports club Askim IF. He took military education at Terningmoen.

He participated in the Battle of Fossum Bridge of the Norwegian Campaign, and was later a member of the Special Operations Executive branch Norwegian Independent Company 1. In 1944, he initiated and was the first leader of the sabotage group Aks 13000. He was decorated with the War Cross with Sword and the War Medal with one Star for his war contributions.

Politically he aligned with the Liberal Party in the post-war period. In the 1961 parliamentary election he was a minor ballot candidate for the party. In 1966, he was released from the Armed Forces after having criticized Norway's nuclear politics.

In 1978, he was convicted to 75 days imprisonment for revealing espionage operations in the Soviet Union during the Cold War, even though the revealed information was made public by Finnish agents in a Finnish newspaper years before Blindheim.

== Selected works ==
- Nordmenn under Hitlers fane. 1977.
- Offiser i krig og fred. 1981.
- Den lange reisen. Et oppgjør med krigen. 2006.
