= Andres Lavik =

Norwegian politician

Andres Johannesson Lavik (5 December 1852 – 1941) was a Norwegian farmer and politician for the Liberal Party.

He was elected to the Parliament of Norway in 1897 from the constituency Søndre Bergenhus Amt, and served one term. He hailed from Eksingedalen and was on the municipal council from Hosanger Municipality from 1888. In 1910 when the new Modalen Municipality was created, he became mayor there.

He was a brother of Andreas, Dore and Johannes Lavik, father of Nils Lavik and uncle of Herbrand Lavik. He was also the maternal grandfather of Svein Blindheim.
