= Herbrand Lavik =

Norwegian writer (1901–1965)

Herbrand Lavik (19 May 1901 – 22 March 1965) was a Norwegian journalist, short story writer, novelist, poet, translator and theatre critic.

He was born in Bergen as a son of newspaper editor Johannes Lavik (1856–1929) and Olivia Heitmann (1862–1944). He was a nephew of Andres, Andreas and Dore and Johannes Lavik and a first cousin of Nils Lavik. In 1930 he married French citizen Laure Jeanne Amélie Birnbaum (1910–1995).

From 1929 he was editor-in-chief of the Florø newspaper Nordre Bergenhus Amtstidende. He made his literary debut in 1937 with the short story collection Frenzie's indianere. In 1945 he published the novel Tunet i det blå and the poetry collection Tolv dikt fra krigens tid. Among his translations are books by James Fenimore Cooper, Daniel Defoe, Charles Dickens and Frederick Marryat. He translated Samuel Pepys' diaries and poetry by François Villon into Norwegian language. From 1945 he was a theatre critic for the newspaper Bergens Tidende.
