= Hammer og Hosanger =

Former electoral district in Norway

Coordinates: 60°34′31″N 5°28′39″E

Hammer og Hosanger was an electoral district in Søndre Bergenhus county, Norway. It existed up to and including the Norwegian parliamentary election, 1882, whence electors were sent to a countywide electoral college. Ahead of the Norwegian parliamentary election, 1885, Alversund was demerged as its own electoral district. Correspondingly, Alversund was demerged as its own bailiff district on 1 January 1887.

It has also been claimed that Hammer og Hosanger was a municipality from 1838 to 1885, but Hosanger Municipality and Hammer Municipality were actually different municipalities. Modalen Municipality was split off from Hosanger Municipality in 1910. Alversund Municipality was split off from Hammer Municipality in 1885 (and from it Meland Municipality in 1923) and Åsane Municipality in 1904.
