= Mo Church (Vestland) =

Church in Vestland, Norway

- Mo kyrkje
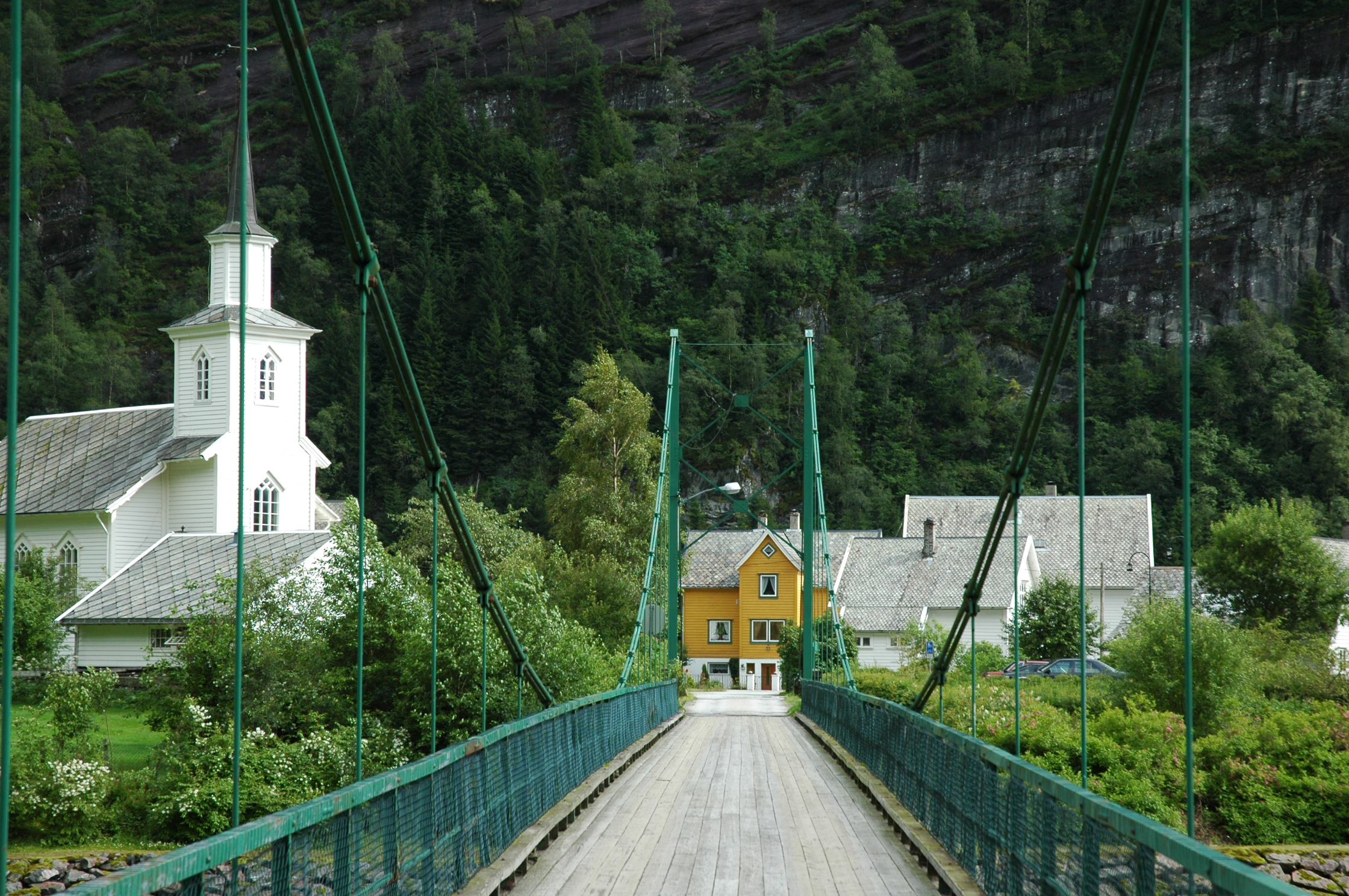
- View of the church
- Mo Church
- 60°48′56″N 5°48′09″E
- Location: Modalen Municipality, Vestland
- Country: Norway
- Denomination: Church of Norway
- Previous denomination: Catholic Church
- Churchmanship: Evangelical Lutheran

History
- Status: Parish church
- Founded: 12th century
- Consecrated: 11 July 1883

Architecture
- Functional status: Active
- Architect: Johannes Øvsthus
- Architectural type: Long church
- Style: Neo-Gothic
- Completed: 1883 (143 years ago)

Specifications
- Capacity: 220
- Materials: Wood

Administration
- Diocese: Bjørgvin bispedømme
- Deanery: Nordhordland prosti
- Parish: Mo
- Norwegian Cultural Heritage Site
- Type: Church
- Status: Not protected
- ID: 84967

Mo Church (Norwegian: Mo kyrkje) is a parish church of the Church of Norway in Modalen Municipality in Vestland county, Norway. It is located in the village of Mo. It is the church for the Mo parish which is part of the Nordhordland prosti (deanery) in the Diocese of Bjørgvin. The white, wooden, neo-Gothic church was built in a long church design in 1883 using plans drawn up by the architect Johannes Øvsthus. The church seats about 220 people.

== History ==
The earliest existing historical records of the church date back to the year 1360, but it was not built that year. The first church in Modalen was a wooden stave church that was likely built during the second half of the 12th century. In 1550, the old choir was torn down and a new one was built to replace it. In 1593, the old church was torn down and replaced with a timber-framed building on the same site. This new church was a small tar-covered wooden long church with a tower that seated about 130 people. During the 17th and 18th centuries, the church was remodeled and renovated several times, with an especially large addition to the east in 1831.

In 1883, a new church was built just to the south of the old church. The new church was designed and built by Johannes Øvsthus who possibly based his drawings on other drawings by Jacob Wilhelm Nordan. It was a wooden long church with a rectangular nave and choir, with a sacristy extension to the east of the choir. Some of the items used in the old church were kept such as the altarpiece, baptismal font, candlesticks, as well as some old Bibles. The new church cost 13,500 kr and it was consecrated on 11 July 1883. After it was completed, the old church was torn down and its materials were sold.

Historically, this church was an annex chapel that belonged to the Hamre prestegjeld (parish) until 1749. From 1749 until 1967 it was part of the Hosanger prestegjeld, being upgraded to the status of parish church at some point. In 1967, the church became part of the Østereidet prestegjeld, based in Lindås Municipality. Since 2004, the church has been the only church in the Mo parish which includes all of Modalen Municipality.

== Media gallery ==
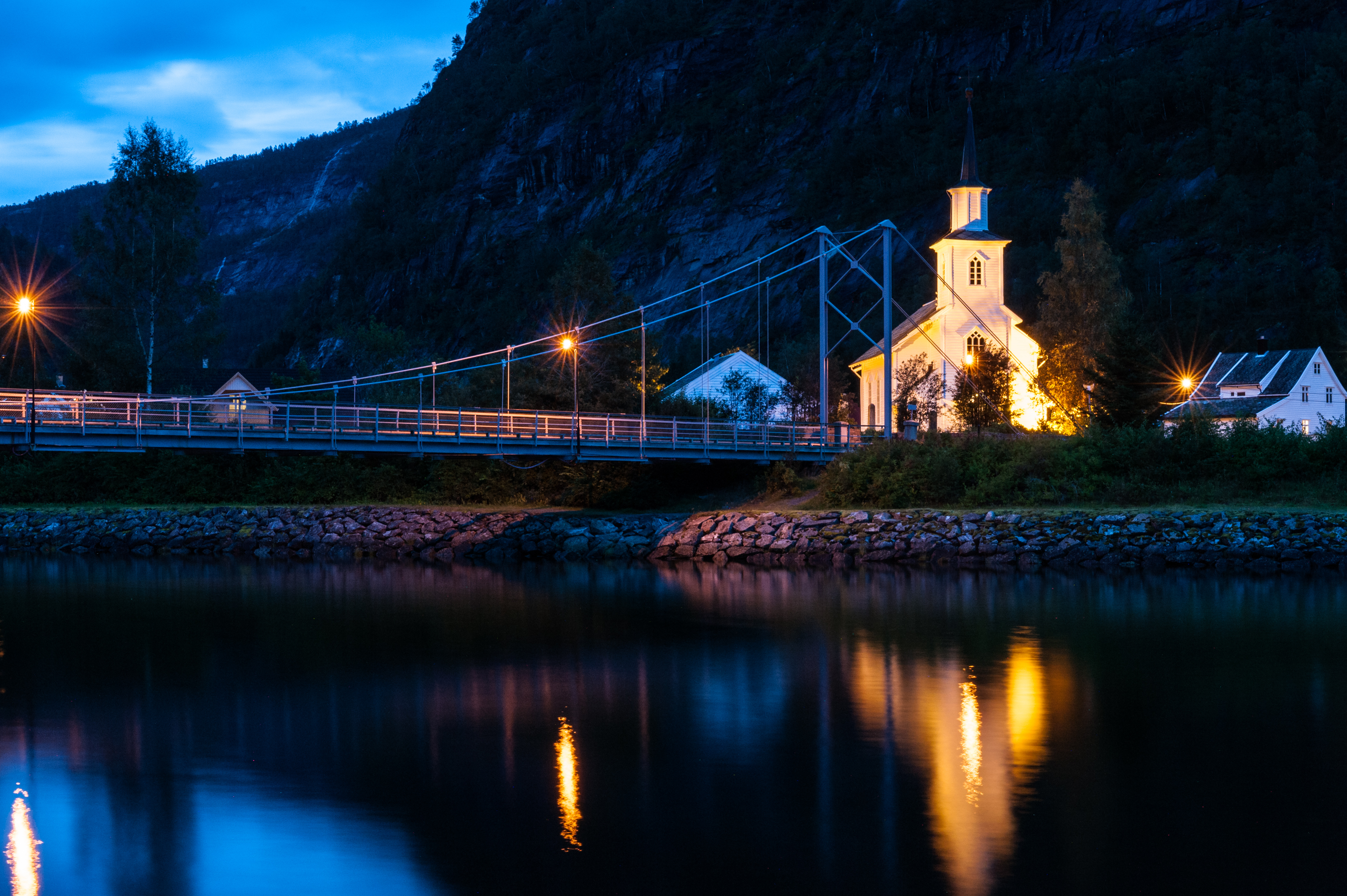

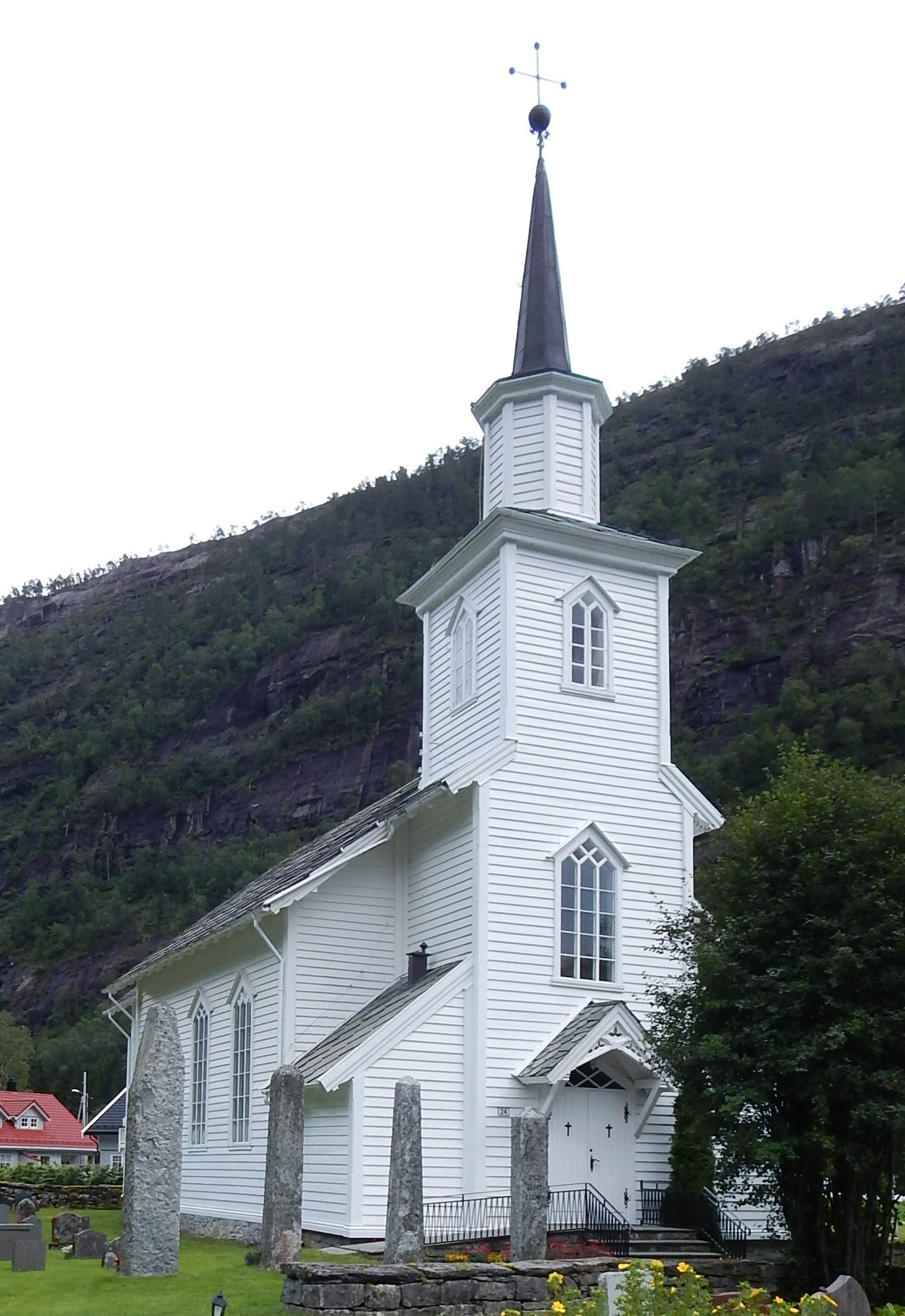

== See also ==
- List of churches in Bjørgvin
