= Fotlandsvåg =

Village in Osterøy Municipality, Norway

- Village
- Interactive map of Fotlandsvåg
- Coordinates: 60.58964°N 5.52406°E
- Country: Norway
- Region: Western Norway
- County: Vestland
- District: Nordhordland
- Municipality: Osterøy Municipality

Area
  - Total: 0.39 km^{2} (0.15 sq mi)
- Elevation: 7 m (23 ft)

Population (2025)
  - Total: 277
  - Density: 710/km^{2} (1,800/sq mi)
- Time zone: UTC+01:00 (CET)
  - Summer (DST): UTC+02:00 (CEST)
- Post Code: 5283 Fotlandsvåg

Fotlandsvåg is a village in Osterøy Municipality in Vestland county, Norway. The village is located on the northern shore of the island of Osterøy, along the Osterfjorden. The village lies in the northeastern part of the municipality, about 6 kilometres (3.7 mi) southwest of the village of Tysso and about the same distance northeast of the village of Hosanger. The village of Ostereidet (in Alver Municipality) lies just across the 3-kilometre (1.9 mi) wide Osterfjorden.

The 0.39-square-kilometre (96-acre) village has a population (2019) of 277 and a population density of 710 inhabitants per square kilometre (1,800/sq mi). The main industries in the village are furniture manufacturing and fish farming as well as a hotel "Fjordslottet".
