= Mo, Vestland =

Village in Modalen Municipality, Norway

Mo Mo i Modalen
- Village
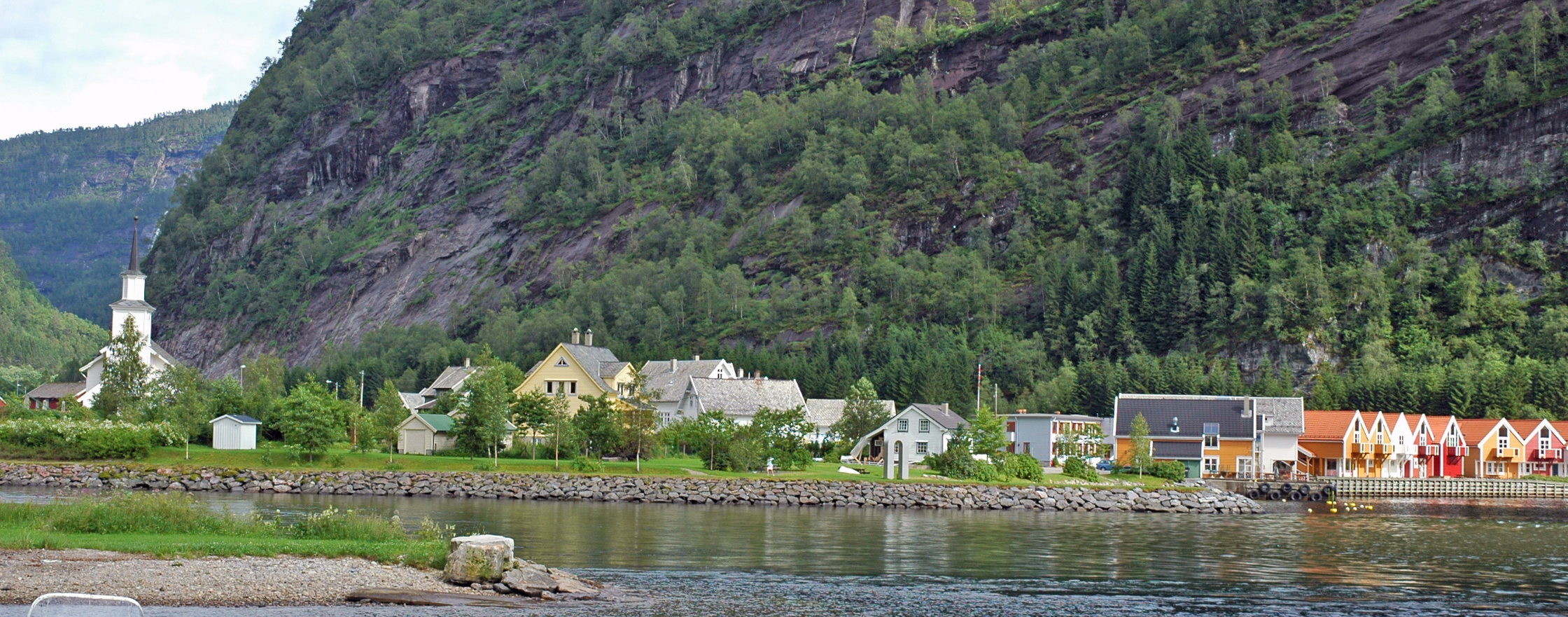
- View of the village
- Interactive map of Mo
- Coordinates: 60.81501°N 5.80287°E
- Country: Norway
- Region: Western Norway
- County: Vestland
- District: Nordhordland
- Municipality: Modalen Municipality
- Elevation: 4 m (13 ft)
- Time zone: UTC+01:00 (CET)
  - Summer (DST): UTC+02:00 (CEST)
- Post Code: 5729 Modalen

Mo is the administrative centre of Modalen Municipality in Vestland county, Norway. The village lies at the mouth of the river Moelva, where it empties into the Romarheimsfjorden (also known as the Mofjorden). The village of Øvre Helland lies about 15 kilometres (9.3 mi) upstream (to the northeast) along the river Moelva. The small village of Mo has about 100 residents.

It is the seat of the municipal government and it is also the site of Mo Church, the only Church of Norway church in the municipality. The church was built in 1883 by the architect Johannes Øvsthus. The main "centre" of the village lies along the shore of the fjord where there are some small shops and a hotel that is run by some Icelanders.

The village was inaccessible by car to the rest of Norway until 1976 when the Modalen Tunnel was built. The north end of the tunnel sits at the east end of the village of Mo and the tunnel cuts through the mountains heading south to the Eksingedalen valley in neighboring Vaksdal Municipality. In 1996, a road was built along the Mofjorden heading east from Mo. That road and tunnel connects the municipality to Romarheim in Alver Municipality.

== Media gallery ==
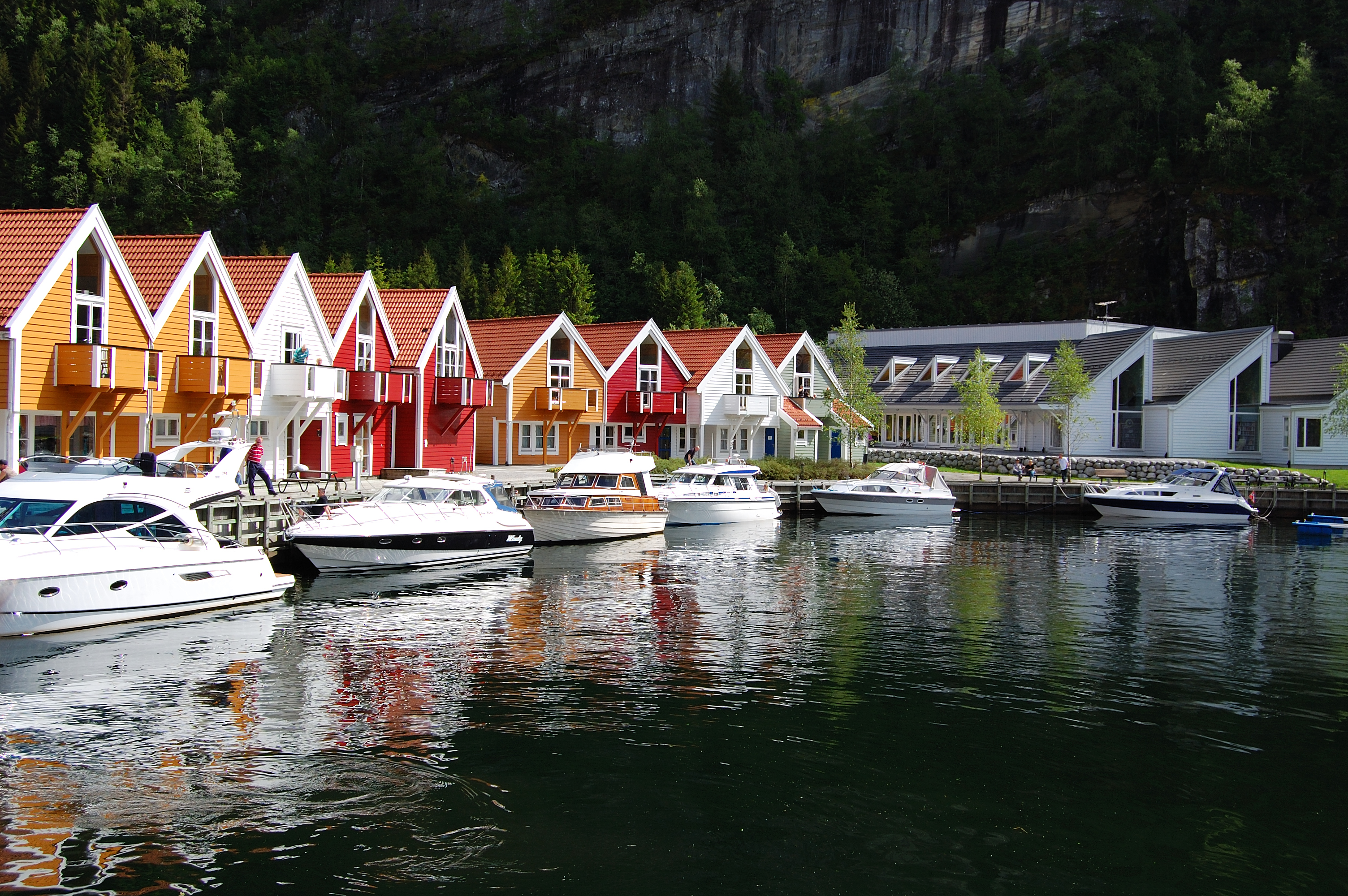
Waterfront area looking south

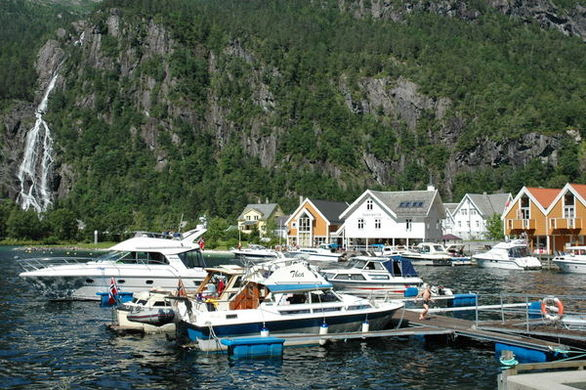
Waterfront area looking north

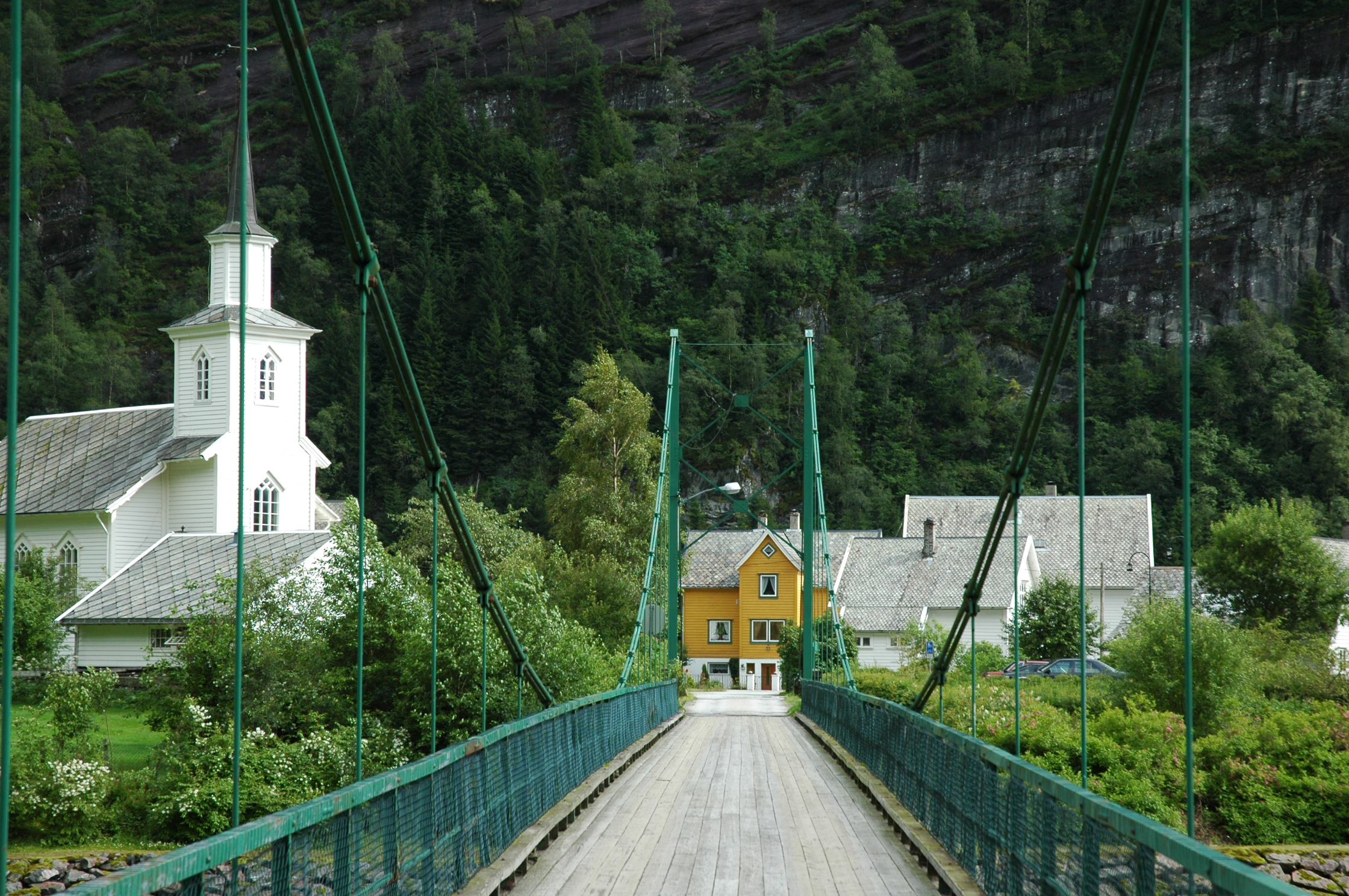
Mo Church
