= Hosanger Municipality =

Former municipality in Hordaland, Norway

Hosanger Municipality Hosanger herad
- Former municipality
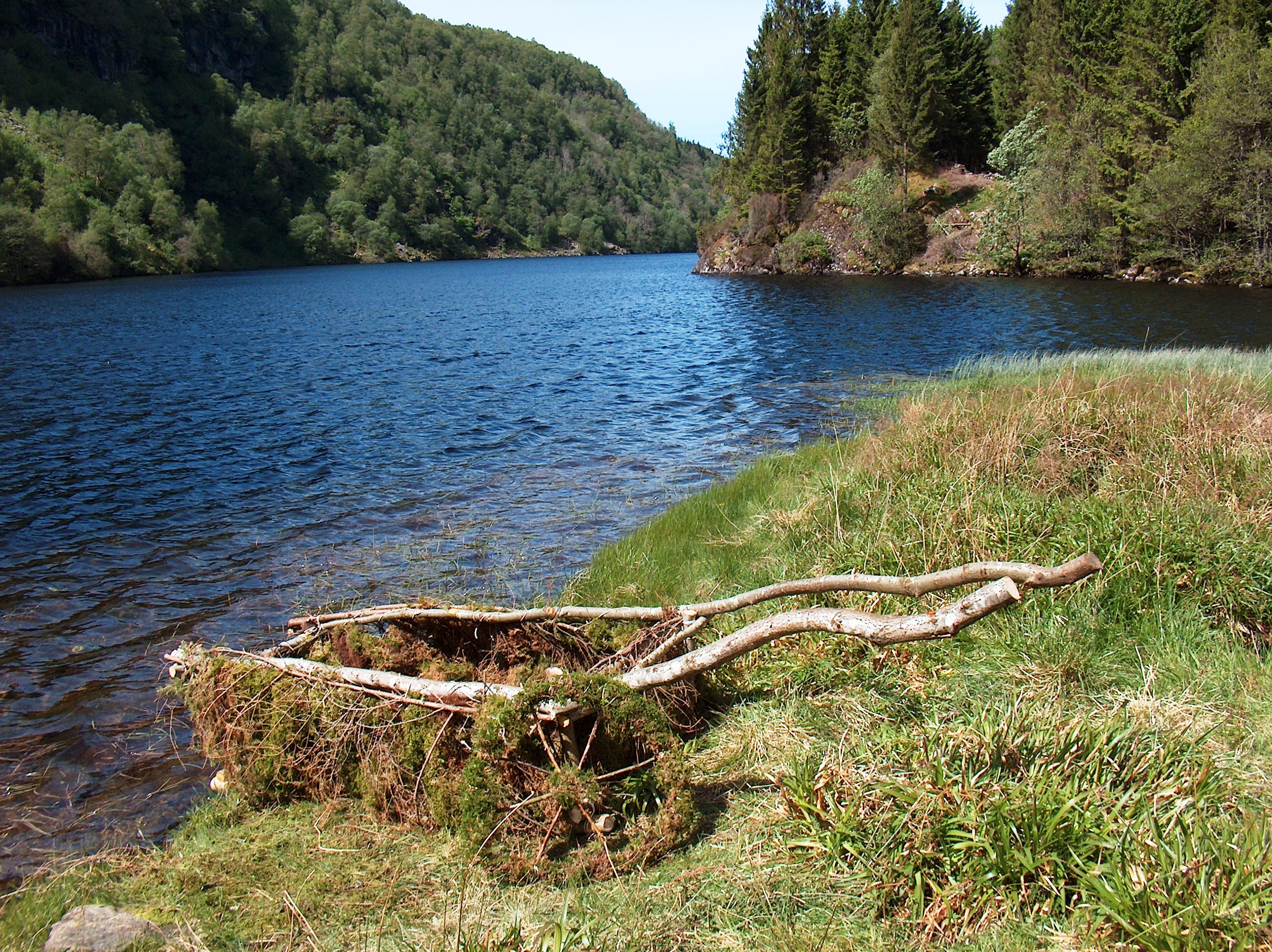
- View of the lake Kossdalsvatnet

- Hordaland within Norway

- Hosanger within Hordaland
- Coordinates: 60°34′30″N 05°28′39″E
- Country: Norway
- County: Hordaland
- District: Nordhordland
- Established: 1 Jan 1838
  - Created as: Formannskapsdistrikt
- Disestablished: 1 Jan 1964
  - Succeeded by: Osterøy Municipality and Lindås Municipality
- Administrative centre: Hosanger

Government
  - Mayor (1959–1963): Bernhard Bysheim (Ap)

Area (upon dissolution)
  - Total: 231.8 km^{2} (89.5 sq mi)
  - Rank: #343 in Norway
- Highest elevation: 868 m (2,848 ft)

Population (1963)
  - Total: 2,442
  - Rank: #373 in Norway
  - Density: 10.5/km^{2} (27/sq mi)
  - Change (10 years): ▼ −9.9%

Official language
  - Norwegian form: Nynorsk
- Time zone: UTC+01:00 (CET)
  - Summer (DST): UTC+02:00 (CEST)
- ISO 3166 code: NO-1253

Hosanger is a former municipality in the old Hordaland county, Norway. The 231.8-square-kilometre (89.5 sq mi) municipality existed from 1838 until its dissolution in 1964. The area is now divided between Alver Municipality and Osterøy Municipality in the traditional district of Nordhordland in Vestland county. The administrative centre was the village of Hosanger on the island of Osterøy, where Hosanger Church is located.

Prior to its dissolution in 1964, the 231.8-square-kilometre (89.5 sq mi) municipality was the 343rd largest by area out of the 689 municipalities in Norway. Hosanger Municipality was the 373rd most populous municipality in Norway with a population of about 2,442. The municipality's population density was 10.5 inhabitants per square kilometre (27/sq mi) and its population had decreased by 9.9% over the previous 10-year period.

== General information ==
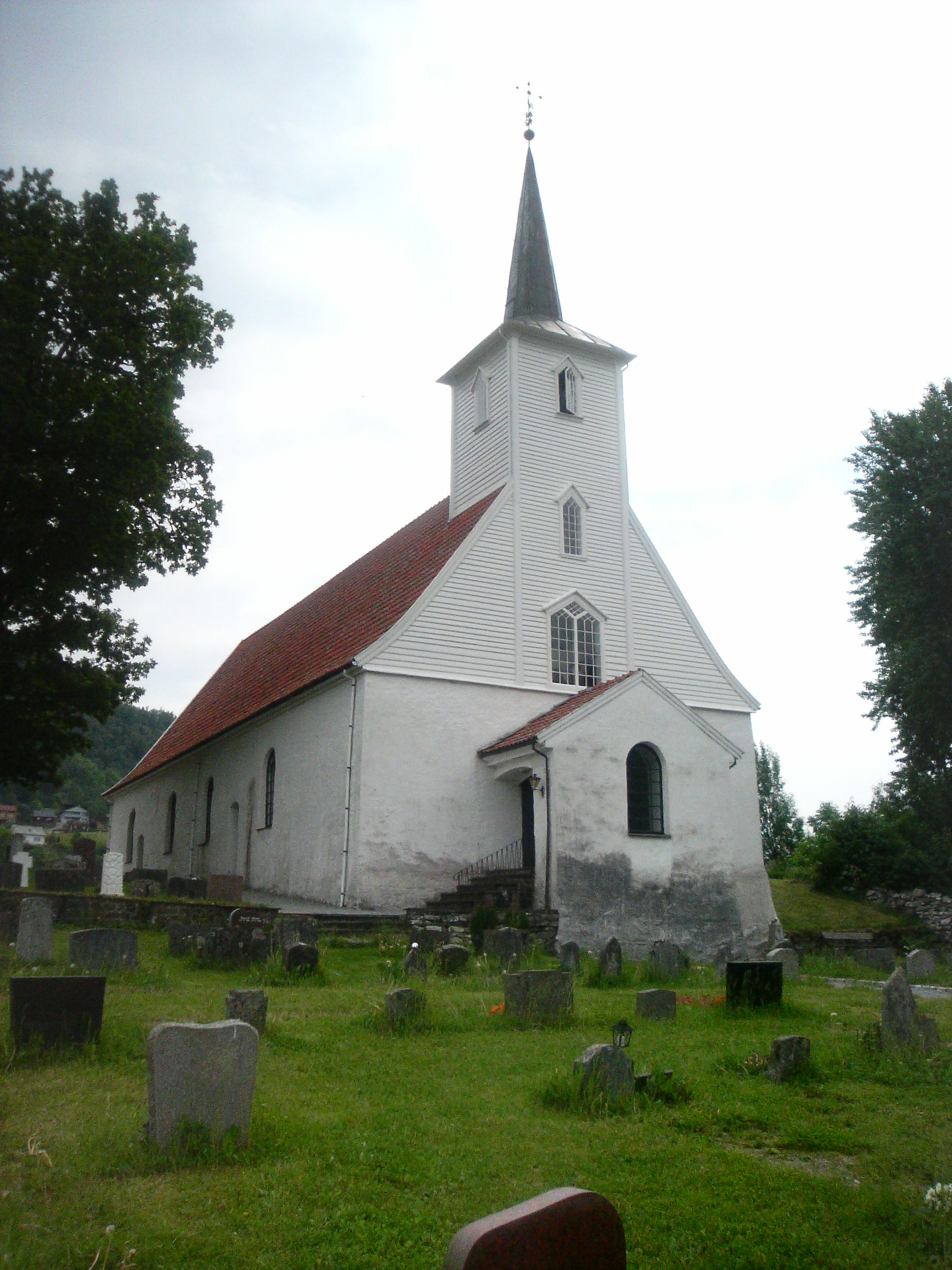
Hosanger Church

The parish of Hosanger was established as a municipality on 1 January 1838 (see formannskapsdistrikt law). On 1 January 1885, the exclave of Seim was separated from Hosanger Municipality and merged into the new Alversund Municipality. This left Hosanger Municipality with 3,387 residents. On 1 January 1867, the Øksendalen farm (population: 28) in the Eksingedalen valley was transferred from Voss Municipality to Hosanger Municipality by royal resolution. On 1 January 1910, the eastern part of Hosanger Municipality (population: 821) which included the Modalen and Eksingedalen valleys was separated to form the new Modalen Municipality. The split left Hosanger Municipality with 2,524 inhabitants.

During the 1960s, there were many municipal mergers across Norway due to the work of the Schei Committee. On 1 January 1964, Hosanger Municipality was dissolved and its lands were divided as follows amongst its neighbors:

- All of Hosanger Municipality located north of the Osterfjorden (population: 791) became a part of Lindås Municipality.
- All of Hosanger Municipality located on the island of Osterøy (population: 1,616) became a part of the newly-created Osterøy Municipality.

=== Name ===
The municipality (originally the parish) is named Hosanger (Old Norse: Hosangr) which was the old name of the local bay, now known as the Mjøsvågen. The first element is hosa which means "long stocking". The last element is angr which means "bay" or "inlet".

=== Churches ===
The Church of Norway had one parish (sokn) within Hosanger Municipality. At the time of the municipal dissolution, it was part of the Hosanger prestegjeld and the Nordhordland prosti (deanery) in the Diocese of Bjørgvin.

Churches in Hosanger Municipality
Parish (sokn)	Church name	Location of the church	Year built
Hosanger	Hosanger Church	Hosanger	1796
Hosanger	Vike Chapel	Vikaneset	1891

The historic Hosanger Church was built in 1796. It is located in the village of Hosanger and it served as the main church for the municipality. It is a Romanesque-style church constructed of brick and stone. On the site there once was a stave church dating back to the Middle Ages. It was first mentioned in historical records in 1329. Later, a wooden church was constructed. The wooden church was struck by lightning and burned down on Christmas Day 1795. From 1863 until 1865, the church was extended to the west. The vestry extension on the south side of the church was built in 1962–1964.

== Geography ==
Hosanger Municipality originally included all the lands on both sides of the Osterfjorden-Romarheimsfjorden from the Lonevågen fjord all the way east to the county border at the end of the Modalen valley. Hosanger Municipality also included an exclave on the Lindås peninsula surrounding the village of Seim at the southern end of the Lurefjorden. Seim was separated from the rest of Hosanger by part of Lindås Municipality. Over time, the areas of Seim and Modalen were split off from Hosanger. The highest point in the municipality was the 868-metre (2,848 ft) tall mountain Høgafjellet, on the island of Osterøy, on the border with Bruvik Municipality.

Masfjorden Municipality was located to the north, Modalen Municipality was located to the northeast, Bruvik Municipality was located to the east, Haus Municipality was located to the south, Hamre Municipality was located to the southwest, and Lindås Municipality was located to the west.

== Government ==
While it existed, Hosanger Municipality was responsible for primary education (through 10th grade), outpatient health services, senior citizen services, welfare and other social services, zoning, economic development, and municipal roads and utilities. The municipality was governed by a municipal council of directly elected representatives. The mayor was indirectly elected by a vote of the municipal council. The municipality was under the jurisdiction of the Gulating Court of Appeal.

=== Municipal council ===
The municipal council (Heradsstyre) of Hosanger Municipality was made up of 17 representatives that were elected to four year terms. The tables below show the historical composition of the council by political party.

Hosanger heradsstyre 1959–1963
Party name (in Nynorsk)	Number of representatives
Labour Party (Arbeidarpartiet)	7
Conservative Party (Høgre)	2
Joint List(s) of Non-Socialist Parties (Borgarlege Felleslister)	7
Local List(s) (Lokale lister)	1
Total number of members:	17

Hosanger heradsstyre 1955–1959
Party name (in Nynorsk)	Number of representatives
Labour Party (Arbeidarpartiet)	6
Conservative Party (Høgre)	2
Joint List(s) of Non-Socialist Parties (Borgarlege Felleslister)	8
Local List(s) (Lokale lister)	1
Total number of members:	17

Hosanger heradsstyre 1951–1955
Party name (in Nynorsk)	Number of representatives
Labour Party (Arbeidarpartiet)	6
Joint List(s) of Non-Socialist Parties (Borgarlege Felleslister)	9
Local List(s) (Lokale lister)	1
Total number of members:	16

Hosanger heradsstyre 1947–1951
Party name (in Nynorsk)	Number of representatives
Labour Party (Arbeidarpartiet)	6
Joint List(s) of Non-Socialist Parties (Borgarlege Felleslister)	10
Total number of members:	16

Hosanger heradsstyre 1945–1947
Party name (in Nynorsk)	Number of representatives
Labour Party (Arbeidarpartiet)	6
Joint List(s) of Non-Socialist Parties (Borgarlege Felleslister)	10
Total number of members:	16

Hosanger heradsstyre 1937–1941*
Party name (in Nynorsk)	Number of representatives
Labour Party (Arbeidarpartiet)	5
Local List(s) (Lokale lister)	11
Total number of members:	16
Note: Due to the German occupation of Norway during World War II, no elections were held for new municipal councils until after the war ended in 1945.

=== Mayors ===
The mayor (Nynorsk: ordførar) of Hosanger Municipality was the political leader of the municipality and the chairperson of the municipal council. The following people held this position:

- 1838–1843: Rev. Johan Ludvig Heyerdahl
- 1844–1847: Nils Andersen Flataas
- 1848–1855: Rev. Isach Lange Kobro
- 1856–1863: Nils Amundsen Mjøs
- 1864–1865: Nils Andersen Flataas
- 1866–1869: Nils Jakobsen Mjøs
- 1870–1871: Johannes Totland
- 1872–1873: Gudmund O. Øvsthus
- 1874–1877: Sjur Sjursen Rydland
- 1878–1879: Johannes N. Fodtland
- 1880–1907: Ivar O. Heltvedt (MV)
- 1908–1913: Nils A. Litland (V)
- 1914–1919: Nils Mjøs
- 1920–1922: Johannes A. Hanstvedt
- 1923–1924: Martin Eide
- 1924–1925: Ivar Bjørsvik
- 1926–1928: Johannes A. Hanstvedt
- 1929–1937: Ivar Bjørsvik
- 1937–1941: Magne Haukøy (V)
- 1941–1945: Nils Grinde (NS)
- 1946–1955: Magne Haukøy (V)
- 1955–1959: Alv Hagen (Ap)
- 1959–1963: Bernhard Bysheim (Ap)

== Notable people ==
- Nicolai Wergeland, (1780-1848), a priest and politician that wrote the Norwegian Constitution of May 1814
- Arne Bjørndal (1882-1965), a hardingfele fiddler, composer, and folklorist
- Nils Andresson Lavik (1884-1966), a Norwegian politician from the Christian Democratic Party of Norway
- Johannes Lavik (1856-1929), a journalist and newspaper editor

== See also ==
- List of former municipalities of Norway
