= Ludovica Levy =

Danish actress and theatre director

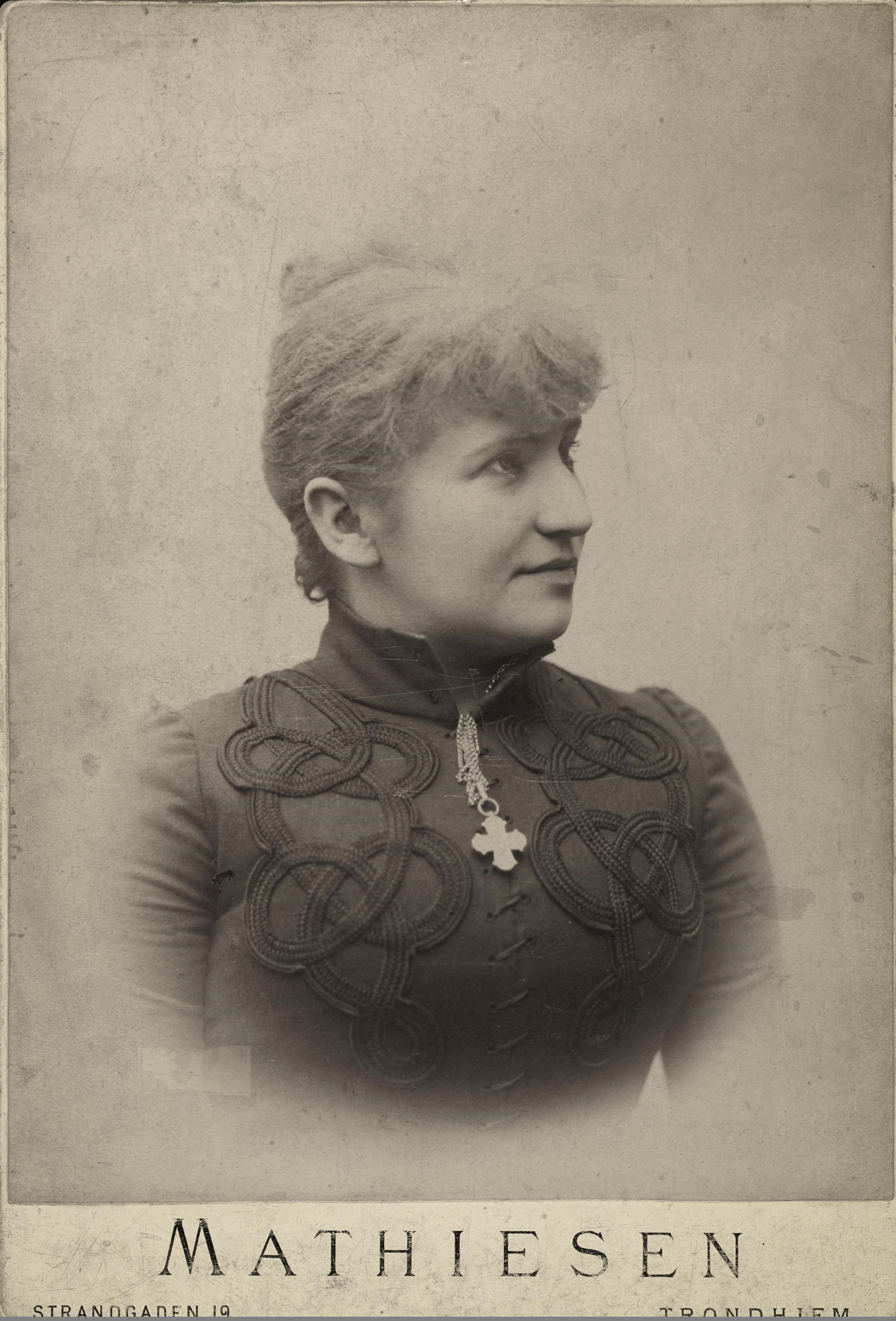
- Ludovica Levy c. 1890
- Born: 7 September 1856; Nakskov, Denmark
- Died: 20 October 1922 (aged 66); Copenhagen, Denmark
- Occupations: Actress, theatre director and theatre critic
- Spouse: Dore Lavik

Ludovica Magdalena Marie Levy (née Dysten, from 1896 to 1906 Levy-Lavik; 7 September 1856 – 20 October 1922) was a Danish actress, theatre director and theatre critic. She toured with theatres in Denmark, Norway, and Sweden, and worked as an instructor for Den Nationale Scene in Bergen. She chaired the theatre Sekondteatret in Kristiania from 1899 to 1901, together with her husband Dore Lavik. She founded the touring theatre Nationalturneen in 1907, and toured in Norway with this theatre until 1912.

== Personal life ==
Ludovica Levy was born in Nakskov as the daughter of shoemaker Lars Henrik Dysten and Maria Magdalene Specht. She was married to actor and theatre director Bernhard Levy from 1873, and to actor Dore Lavik from 1896 to 1906. She died in Copenhagen in 1922.

== Career ==
Growing up in Lolland, she started her acting career as a child actress at the Copenhagen theatre Frederiksberg Teater. From 1871 she performed at Casino Teater in Copenhagen, and also for touring theatres. She visited Norway in 1872 with August Rasmussen's ensemble. The ensemble played at the comedy house in Bergen from September 1872. From 1877 she toured with her husband Bernhard Levy's theatre. The couple joined Olaus Olsen's theatre company from 1880 to 1883, played at the Copenhagen theatre Dagmarteatret, and then toured in Norway with their own ensemble Det Levyske Theaterpersonale until 1890. In 1889 she visited Den Nationale Scene in Bergen, with guest performances in the plays Kameliadamen, Prinsessen af Bagdad and Alle mulige Roller. She worked for the theatre Casino in Copenhagen from 1890 to 1891, and from 1892 for travelling theatres. From 1895 she was appointed as actress and instructor at the Bergen theatre Den Nationale Scene. In Bergen she met her second husband, Dore Lavik, whom she married in 1896. The couple moved to Kristiania in 1899, where they founded the theatre Sekondteatret. In 1899 she staged Wied's satyr play Erotikk, which became very popular and was played over hundred times, the highest number for any performance in Norway in a single season until then. Hauk Aabel had his breakthrough as actor in this play, as the character "Snild". Secondteatret had to close in 1901 after bankruptcy.

She was later a theatre critic for the women's magazine Urd. She founded the touring theater Nationalturneen in 1907, and toured with this theatre until 1912, as director and occasionally actress. From 1914 to 1919 she was a theatre critic for the newspaper Ørebladet. In 1922 she settled in Copenhagen, where she died the same year.
