= Secondteatret =

Coordinates: 59°54′48″N 10°44′01″E

Secondteatret, or Sekondteatret, was a theatre and theatre academy established in Kristiana in 1899 by Ludovica Levy and her husband Dore Lavik. Its opening performance was an adaptation of Schiller's play Mary Stuart on 25 August 1899. The theatre closed in 1901. The building was located on the site of the old Tivoli theatre in central Oslo.
