= Hosanger (village) =

Village in Osterøy Municipality, Norway

- Village
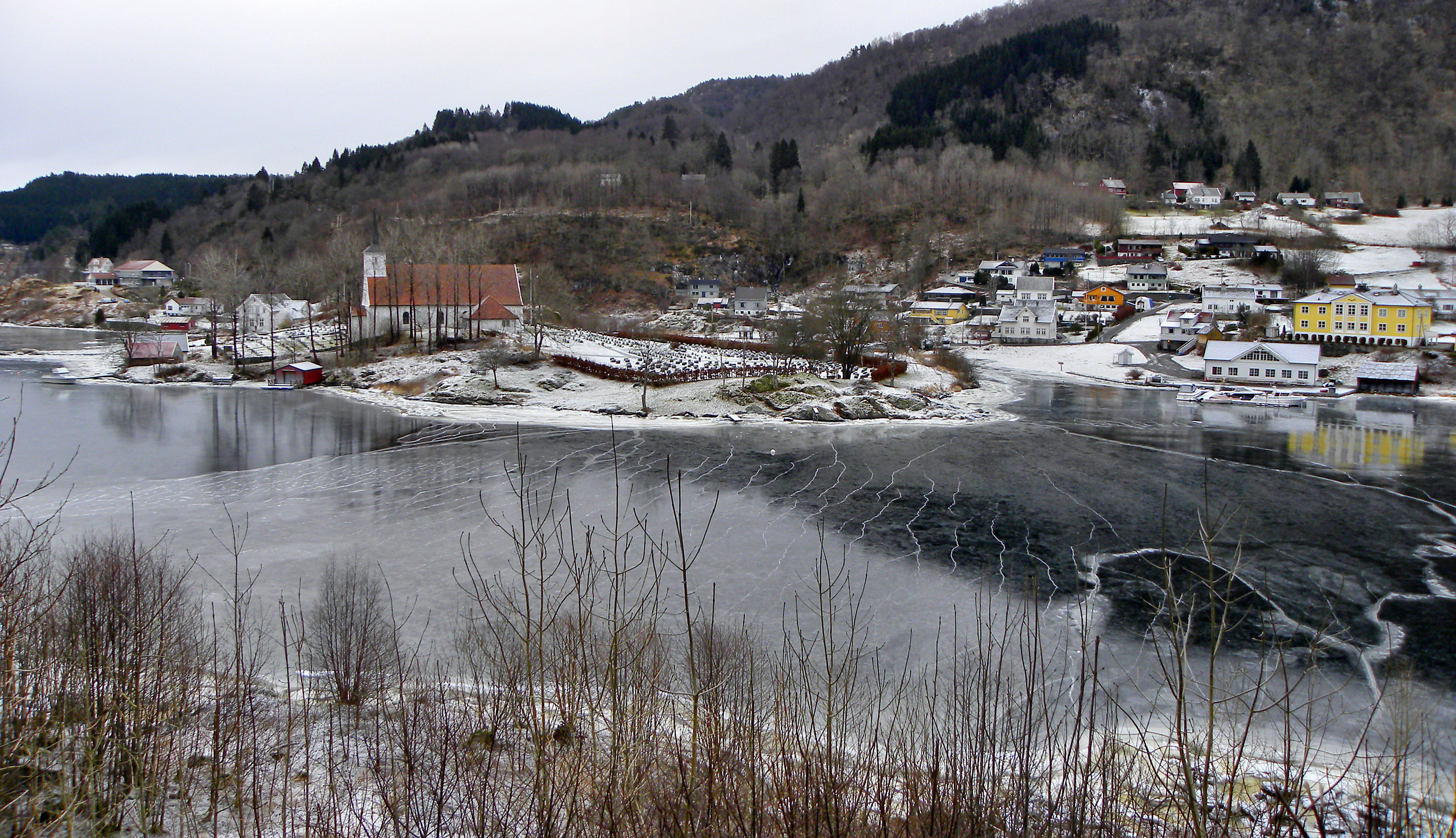
- View of the village
- Interactive map of Hosanger
- Coordinates: 60.57516°N 5.47764°E
- Country: Norway
- Region: Western Norway
- County: Vestland
- District: Nordhordland
- Municipality: Osterøy Municipality
- Elevation: 4 m (13 ft)
- Time zone: UTC+01:00 (CET)
  - Summer (DST): UTC+02:00 (CEST)
- Post Code: 5282 Lonevåg

Hosanger is a village in Osterøy Municipality in Vestland county, Norway. The village is located along the Osterfjorden on the northern shore of the island of Osterøy. The village is 6 kilometres (3.7 mi) north of the municipal centre of Lonevåg and about 5 kilometres (3.1 mi) southwest of Fotlandsvåg.

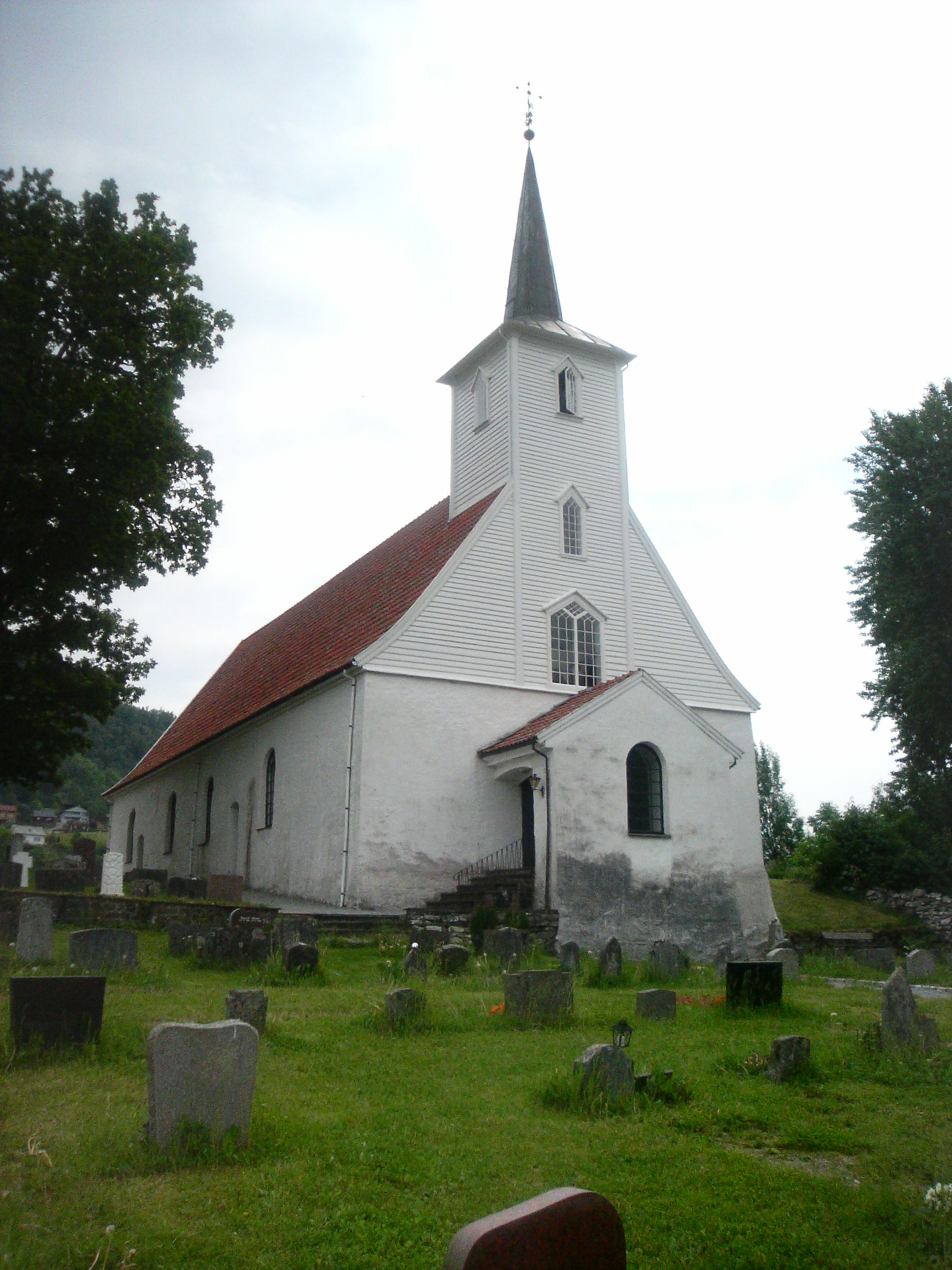
Hosanger Church

== History ==
The village was the administrative center of the old Hosanger Municipality which existed from 1838 until 1964. The historic Hosanger Church is located in the village.
