= Lonevågen =

Fjord in Vestland, Norway

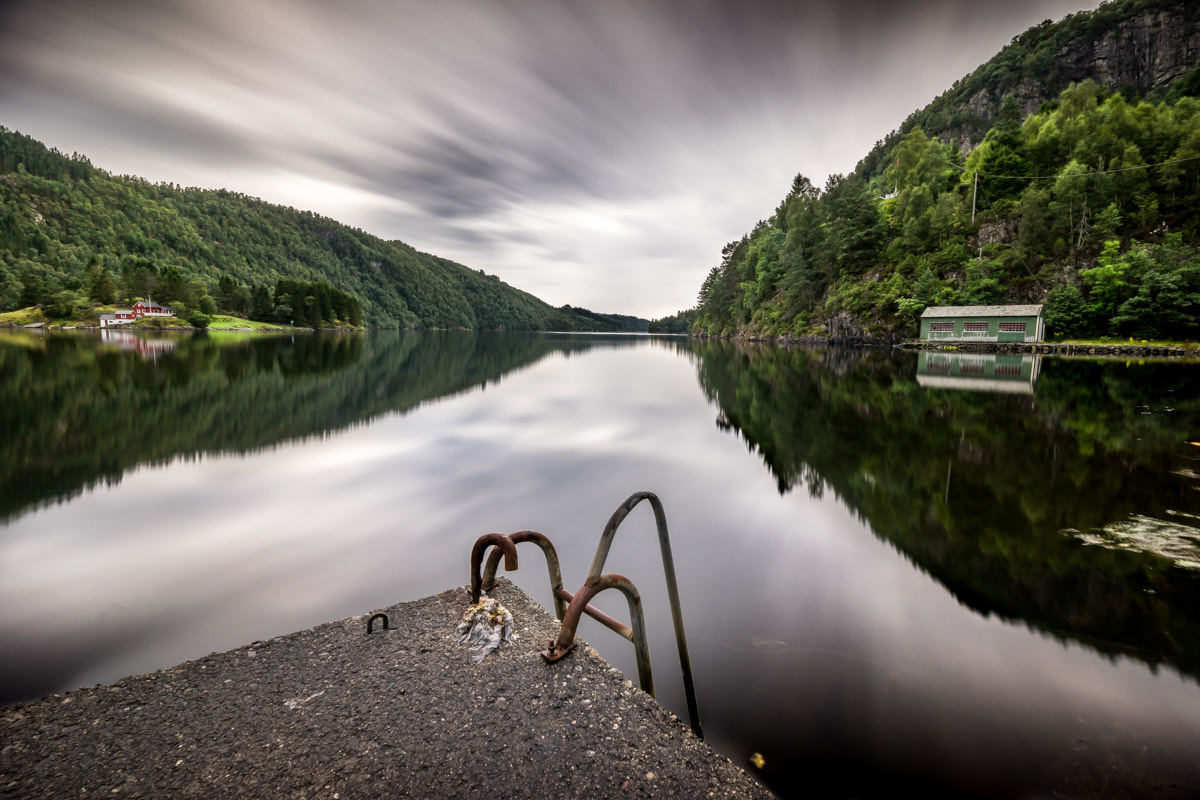
- View of the inner part of the fjord
- Interactive map of Lonevågen
- Location: Vestland county, Norway
- Coordinates: 60.53969°N 5.46982°E
- Type: Fjord
- Basin countries: Norway
- Max. length: 5 kilometres (3.1 mi)
- Max. width: 500 metres (1,600 ft)

Lonevågen is a small fjord arm flowing south off of the main Osterfjorden in Vestland county, Norway. The 5-kilometre (3.1 mi) long fjord is up to 500 metres (1,600 ft) wide. The fjord cuts into the island of Osterøy in Osterøy Municipality. The village of Lonevåg, the administrative center of Osterøy Municipality, is located at the end of the fjord.

== See also ==
- List of Norwegian fjords
