= Vestlandsbonden =

Newspaper published in Bergen, Norway

Vestlandsbonden was a Norwegian newspaper, published in Bergen in Hordaland county.

De Yngre Norske Landmænds Blad was started on 14 October 1904 as an organ for farmers. It changed its name to Vestlandsbonden from 5 January 1911, but after its last issue on 26 June 1915 it was incorporated into Bondebladet. It was published in Bergen.
