= Johannes Lavik (born 1883) =

Johannes Lavik (1883 – 29 September 1952) was a Norwegian jurist, journalist and newspaper editor. He was born in Kvinnherad Municipality to the parliamentarian and revivalist Andreas Lavik. He edited the newspaper Dagen for more than thirty years, from 1919 to 1952.
