= Erin Lavik =

American material scientist

Erin B. Lavik
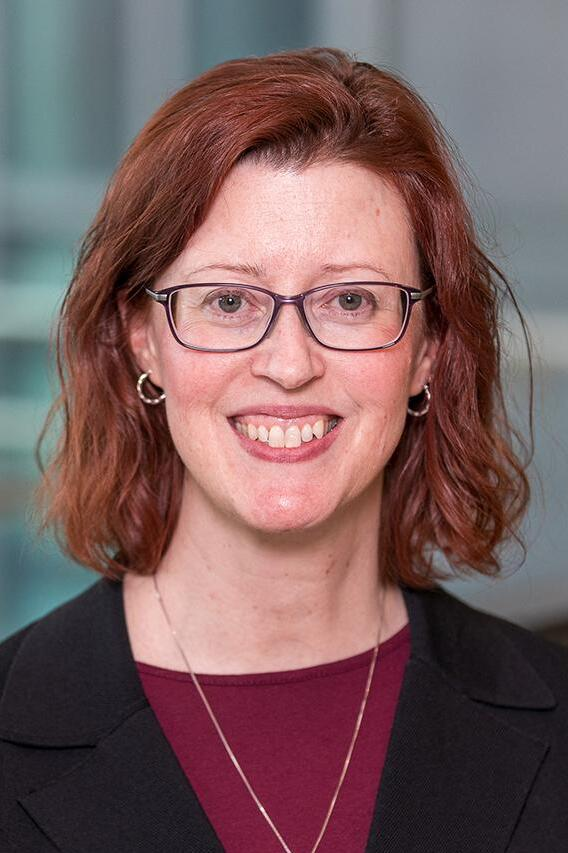
- Born: 1973 (age 52–53)
- Education: Massachusetts Institute of Technology
- Scientific career
- Workplaces: Yale University; University of Maryland, Baltimore County; National Cancer Institute

Erin Baker Lavik (born 1973) is an American bioengineer serving as the deputy director and chief technology officer of the National Cancer Institute's Division of Cancer Prevention (DCP) since 2023. She was previously a professor of chemical, biochemical, and environmental engineering at the University of Maryland, Baltimore County. Lavik develops polymers and nanoparticles that can protect the nervous system. She is a fellow of the American Institute for Medical and Biological Engineering.

== Early life and education ==
Lavik's father was a lawyer and her mother was an accountant. She was given a catapult as a teenager and broke her parents' windshield. She attended National Cathedral School, and had to take advanced placement physics courses at the nearby boys' school St. Albans School. Lavik was unsure whether to become a veterinarian or high school teacher, but her mother sat next to Martha Gray on an aeroplane and realised that she had a career Lavik would enjoy. She completed her bachelor's degree in materials science at Massachusetts Institute of Technology in 1995. She minored in theatre and is still a playwright. Her master's PhD looked at the electrical properties of cerium(IV) oxide. She stayed at MIT for her graduate studies, completing her master's degree and PhD in 2001.

Lavik created polymer scaffolds were seeded with neural stem cells, and implanted them in to paralysed rats. These spinal implants were developed whilst Lavik was a graduate student at MIT, mimicking the anatomy of the spine by binding a porous piece of polymer fabric and a plastic cylinder and including narrow channels for axons. Lavik conducted the experiment on 50 female paraplegic rats, and 7 out of 10 rats fitted with Lavik's scaffold-stem cell design could walk again. She was awarded the John Wuff Award for Excellence in Teaching. In 2003, two years after graduating her PhD, she was nominated to the TR100 list. Lavik was an assistant professor at Yale University, where she developed polymer scaffolds that imitate the spinal cord. She was nominated for a 2004 WIRED RAVE Award. In 2004 Lavik wrote the play Galileo Walking among the Stars, a play where Galileo, Kepler and Gene Kelly build a spaceship. She was selected as one of the Connecticut Technology Council's top women in innovation in 2008.

== Career ==
Lavik was made an assistant professor at Case Western Reserve University where she worked on nanotechnology and biodegradable polymers. Today she is a member of the College of Engineering and Information Technology at University of Maryland, Baltimore County. She is interested in translatable approaches to treat injuries and disease. She works on tissue engineering and diseases of the central nervous system, including glaucoma and retinal degeneration.

Lavik has explored ways that nanoparticles can help reduce internal bleeding. The nanoparticles attach to activated platelets, forming clots and stopping bleeding. The nanoparticles are delivered intravenously and include a molecule that binds to a glycoprotein. They are based on poly(lactic-co-glycolic acid), polyethylene glycol and Arginine-Glycine-Aspartic acid. Lavik developed the nanoparticles using pig's blood, identifying which had the appropriate immune response. The nanoparticles could half the bleeding time in femoral artery models. Lavik and her team hoped that medics and emergency responders would carry the nanoparticles to treat traumatic injuries. In 2010 she was awarded the National Institutes of Health Director's New Innovator Award for the discovery. The NIH grant allows Lavik to explore the nanoparticles traumatic injuries of the central nervous system. The work underwent clinical tests at Case Western Reserve University. She found that the length of the polyethylene glycol arms and choice of peptide impacts the efficacy and clearance of the nanoparticles. She has also looked at spinal cord injury, exploring the optimal time to deliver nanoparticles after traumatic injury. Alongside her work on nanoparticles, Lavik engineers solutions for retinal degeneration, including screen printing human eye tissues. Her technique, which layers adult stem cells, was selected by the National Eye Institute's 3-D Retina Organoid Challenge. She contributed to the 2013 Elsevier book Retina, talking about drug delivery.

Lavik is a member of the University of Maryland, Baltimore County Women in Science and Engineering group. She is an advocate for improving diversity in the sciences. She was made a Fellow of the American Institute for Medical and Biological Engineering in 2014. In 2016 she delivered a TEDxBroadway talk on theatre and engineering. She discussed the importance of collaboration in scientific research and teamwork in theatre.

Lavik became the second deputy director and first chief technology officer of the National Cancer Institute's Division of Cancer Prevention (DCP) in August 2023. In this capacity, she provides leadership in how best to apply promising emerging technologies to the prevention and control of cancer and its consequences. In 2024, she was elected a fellow of the American Association for the Advancement of Science.
