= Romarheimsfjorden =

Fjord in Vestland, Norway

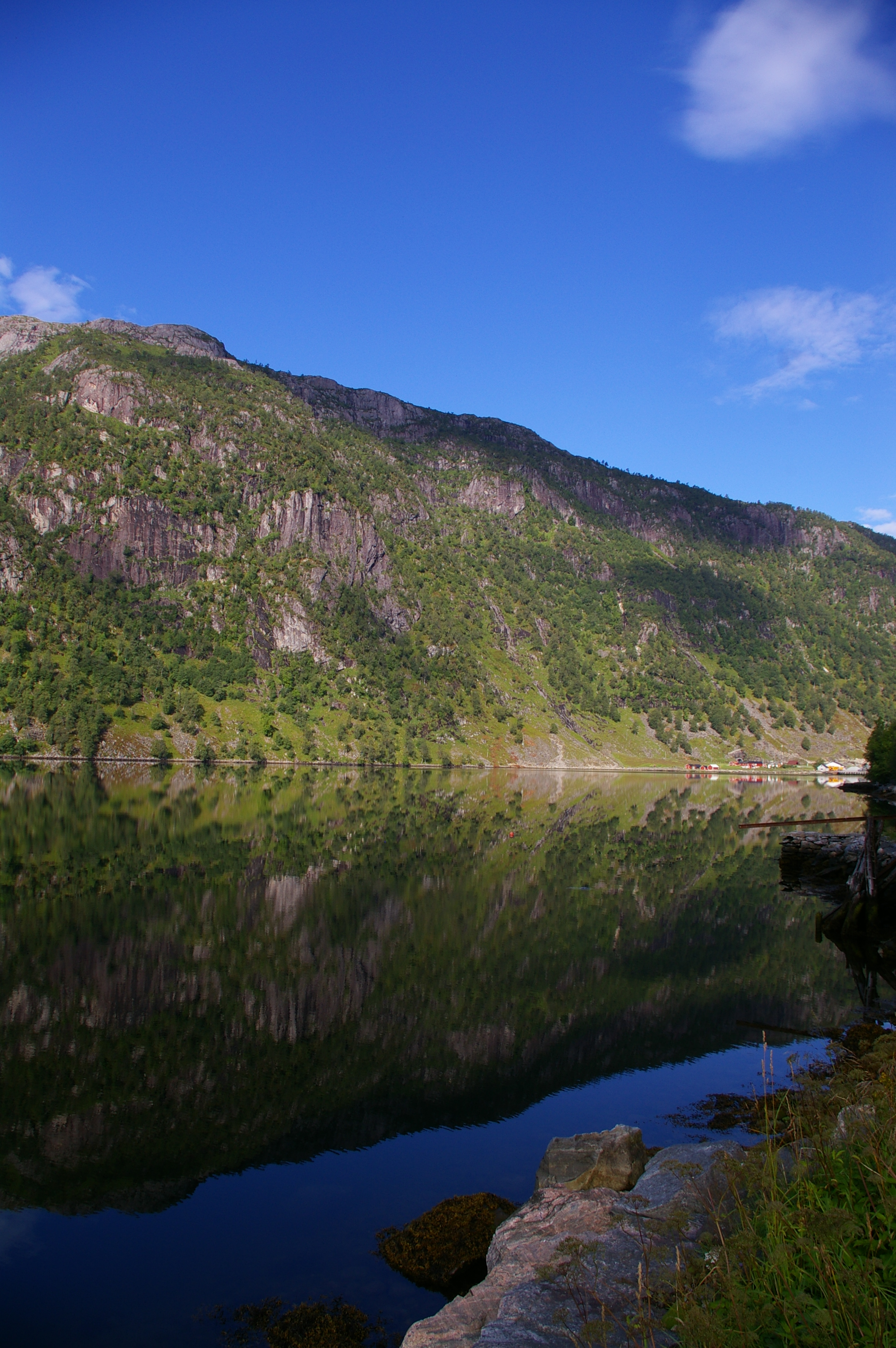
- View of the fjord
- Interactive map of Romarheimsfjorden
- Location: Vestland county, Norway
- Coordinates: 60.72211°N 5.64768°E
- Type: Fjord
- Primary inflows: Mofjorden
- Primary outflows: Osterfjorden
- Basin countries: Norway
- Max. length: 11 kilometres (6.8 mi)

Romarheimsfjorden is a fjord in Vestland county, Norway. The fjord flows through Modalen Municipality, Alver Municipality, and Osterøy Municipality.

The western end of the fjord lies near the island of Hokøy where the fjord flows in to the Osterfjorden on its way out to sea. The fjord extends eastward from Hokøy for 11 kilometres (6.8 mi) along the border of Alver Municipality and Osterøy Municipality before entering Modalen Municipality where it continues to the Mostraumen, a 60-metre (200 ft) wide channel that is 650 metres (2,130 ft) long. On the other side of the channel, the fjord continues for another 18 kilometres (11 mi) where it is usually called the Mofjorden. That fjord ends at the village of Mo.

== See also ==
- List of Norwegian fjords
