= Hosanger Church =

Church in Vestland, Norway

- Hosanger kyrkje
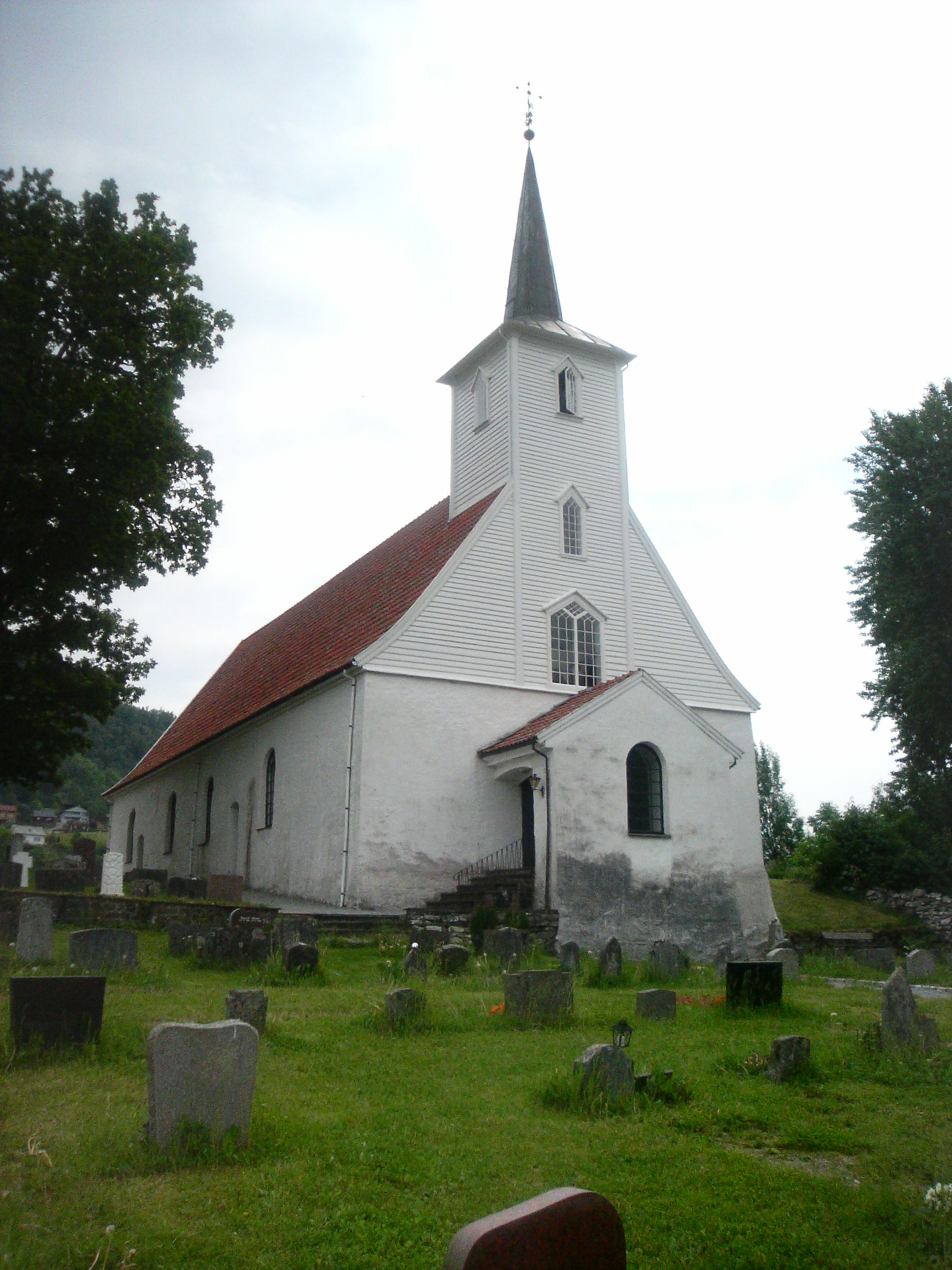
- View of the church
- Hosanger Church
- 60°34′38″N 5°28′29″E
- Location: Osterøy Municipality, Vestland
- Country: Norway
- Denomination: Church of Norway
- Previous denomination: Catholic Church
- Churchmanship: Evangelical Lutheran

History
- Status: Parish church
- Founded: 13th century
- Consecrated: 1796

Architecture
- Functional status: Active
- Architectural type: Rectangular
- Completed: 1796 (230 years ago)

Specifications
- Capacity: 275
- Materials: Stone

Administration
- Diocese: Bjørgvin bispedømme
- Deanery: Åsane prosti
- Parish: Hosanger
- Norwegian Cultural Heritage Site
- Type: Church
- Status: Automatically protected
- ID: 84636

Hosanger Church (Norwegian: Hosanger kyrkje) is a parish church of the Church of Norway in Osterøy Municipality in Vestland county, Norway. It is located in the village of Hosanger on the northern shore of the island of Osterøy. It is the church for the Hosanger parish which is part of the Åsane prosti (deanery) in the Diocese of Bjørgvin. The white, stone church was built in a rectangular design in 1796 by the "leading men" of the parish. The church seats about 275 people.

== History ==
There has been a church at Hosanger since the Middle Ages. The earliest existing historical records of the church date back to the year 1329, but it wasn't built that year. The first church at Hosanger was a wooden stave church that was likely built in the 13th century. Around the year 1600, the old church was torn down and replaced by a timber-framed long church. Around 1660, a tower was built on the church (this may have been a replacement of the original tower or it was the first tower on the church). A report from 1686 described as "very run down" because of poor exterior maintenance, which suggests that the church, at that time was already relatively old. The church nave measured about 12.5 metres (41 ft) long and it had a square 7.5-by-7.5-metre (25 ft × 25 ft) choir on the east end of the nave. In 1718, a new tower was built on the church. On Christmas Day 1795, lightning struck the church and it burned down. A new stone church was built on the same site the following year. The new church was rectangular with the nave and chancel in the same room. The stone church has walls measuring about 1.3 metres (4 ft 3 in) thick.

In 1814, this church served as an election church (Norwegian: valgkirke). Together with more than 300 other parish churches across Norway, it was a polling station for elections to the 1814 Norwegian Constituent Assembly which wrote the Constitution of Norway. This was Norway's first national elections. Each church parish was a constituency that elected people called "electors" who later met together in each county to elect the representatives for the assembly that was to meet at Eidsvoll Manor later that year.

That stone church was renovated and enlarged from 1863 to 1865. During this project, the nave was extended about 7.5 metres (25 ft) to the west. From 1962 to 1964, the architects Claus Lindstrøm and Jon Lindstrøm renovated the building again. This included the construction of a new sacristy on the south side of the church.

== Media gallery ==
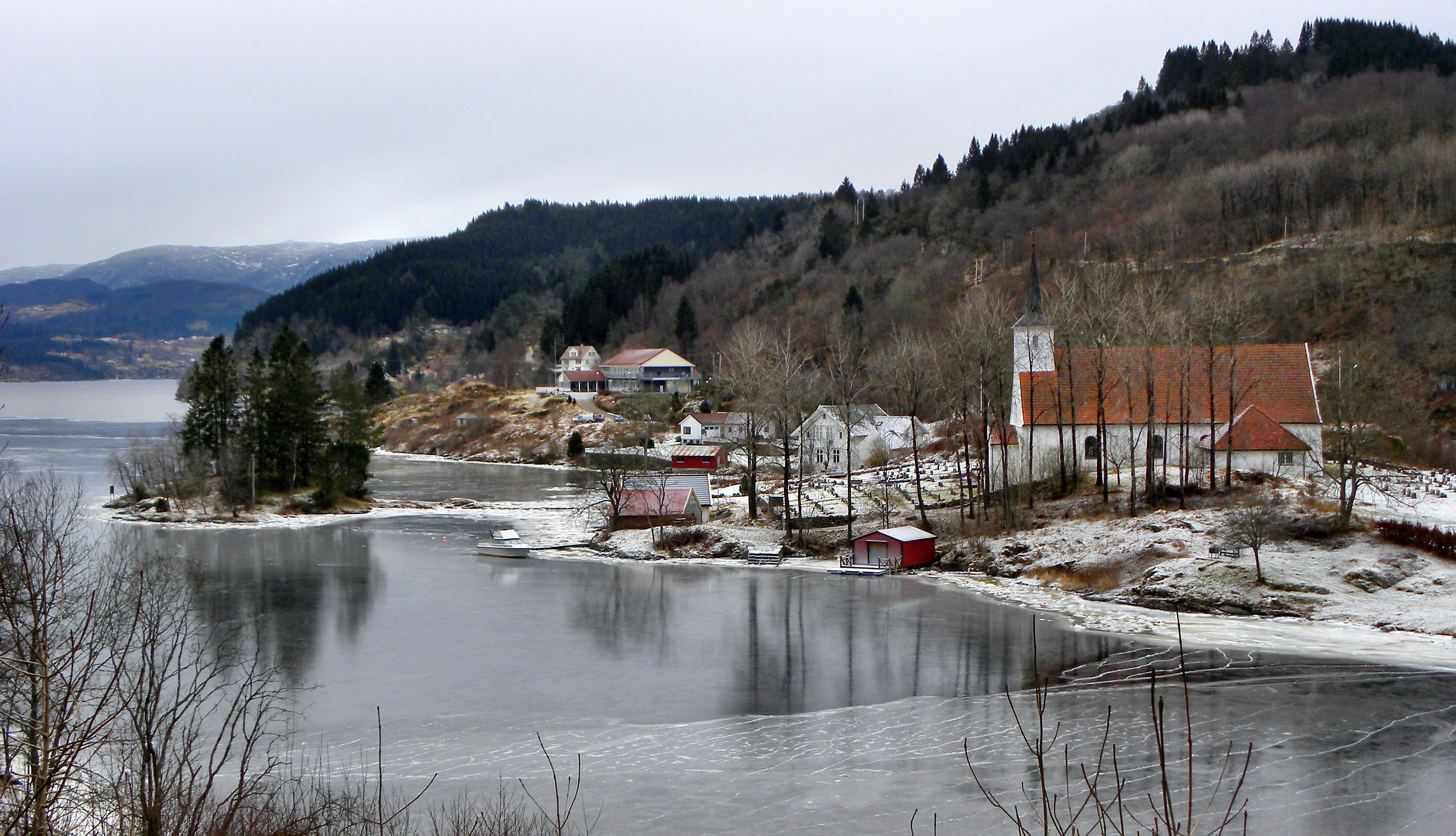

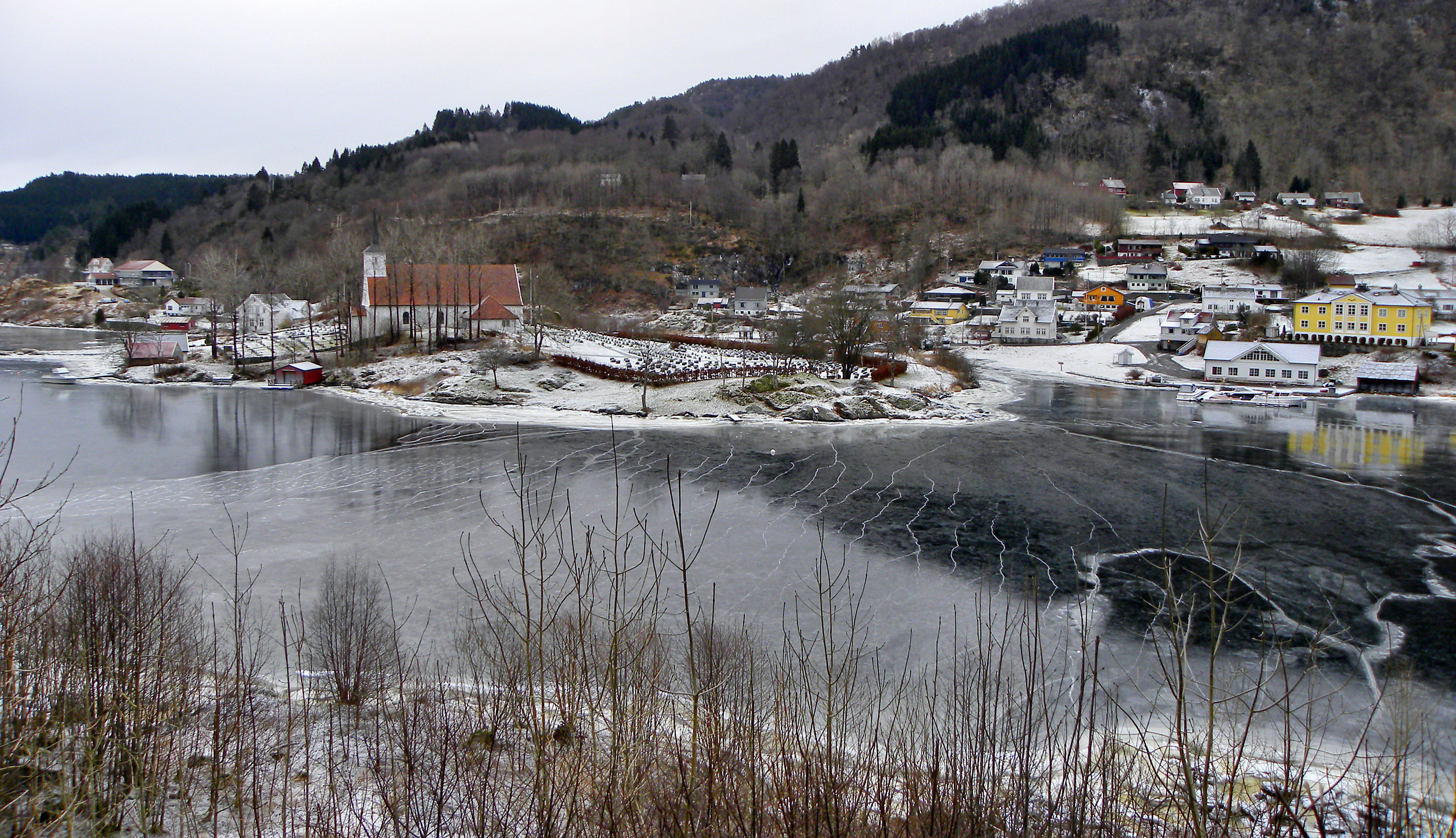

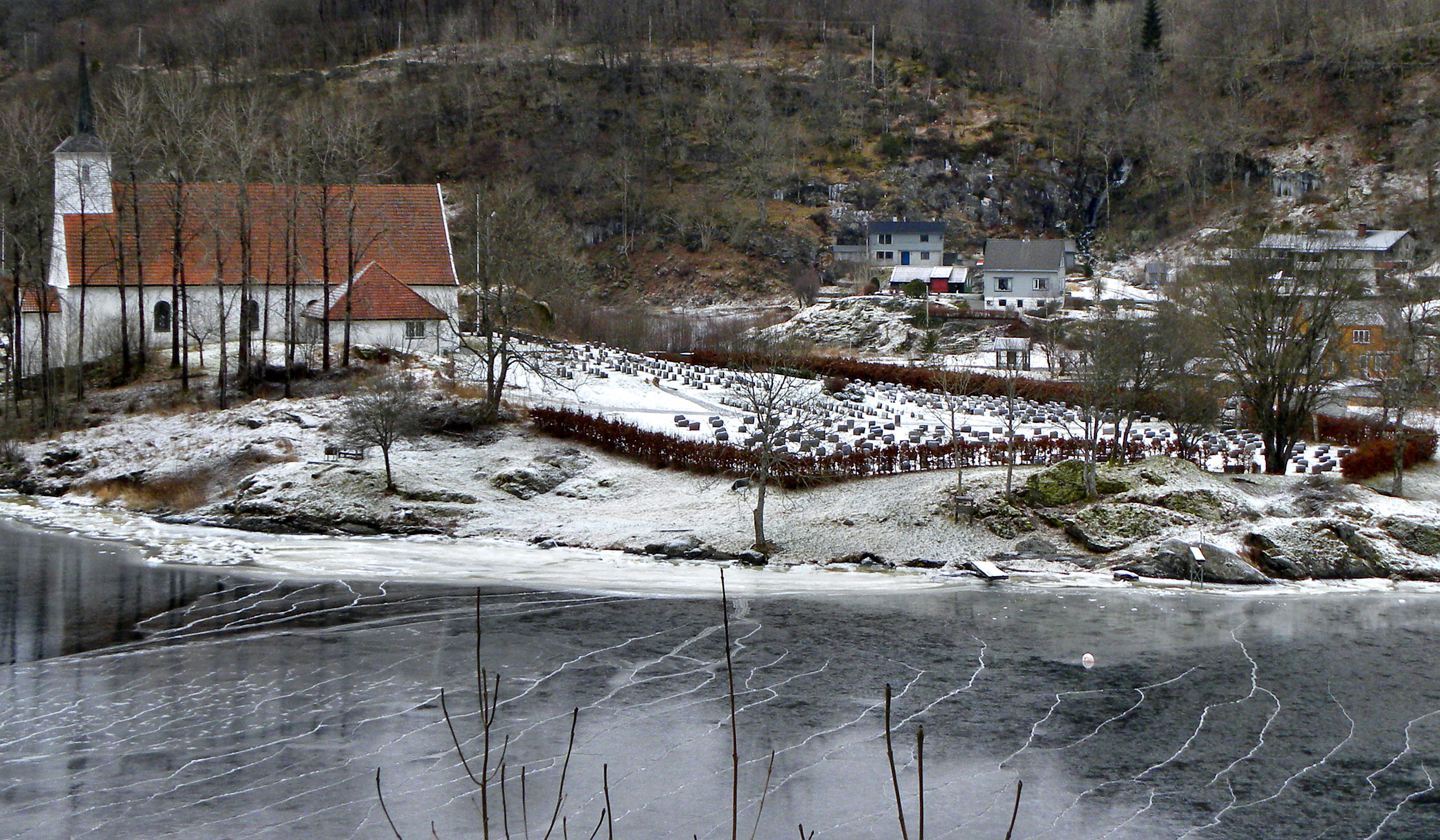

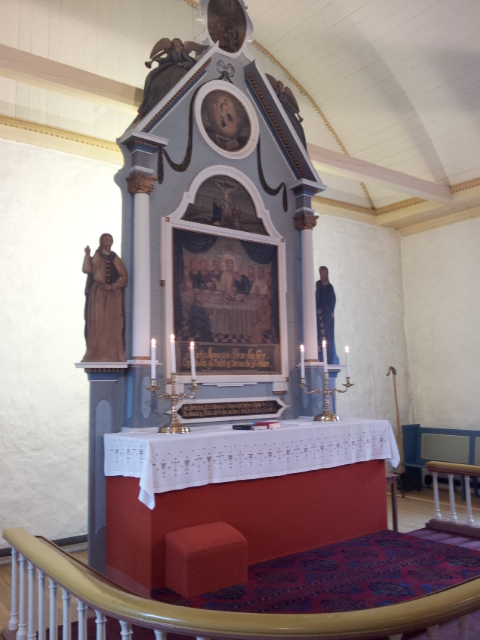

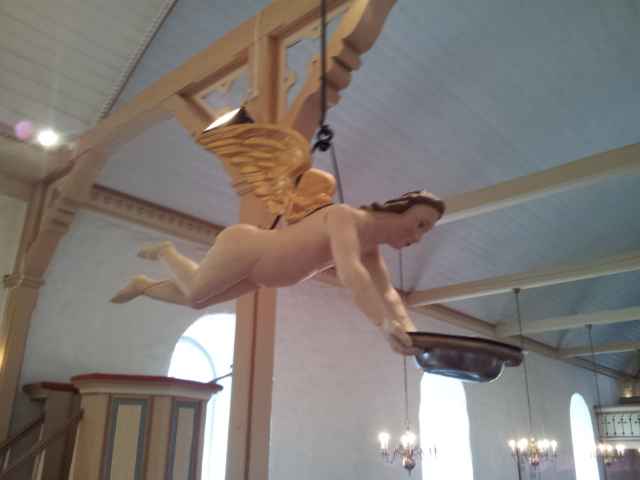

== See also ==
- List of churches in Bjørgvin
