= Osterfjorden =

Fjord in Vestland, Norway

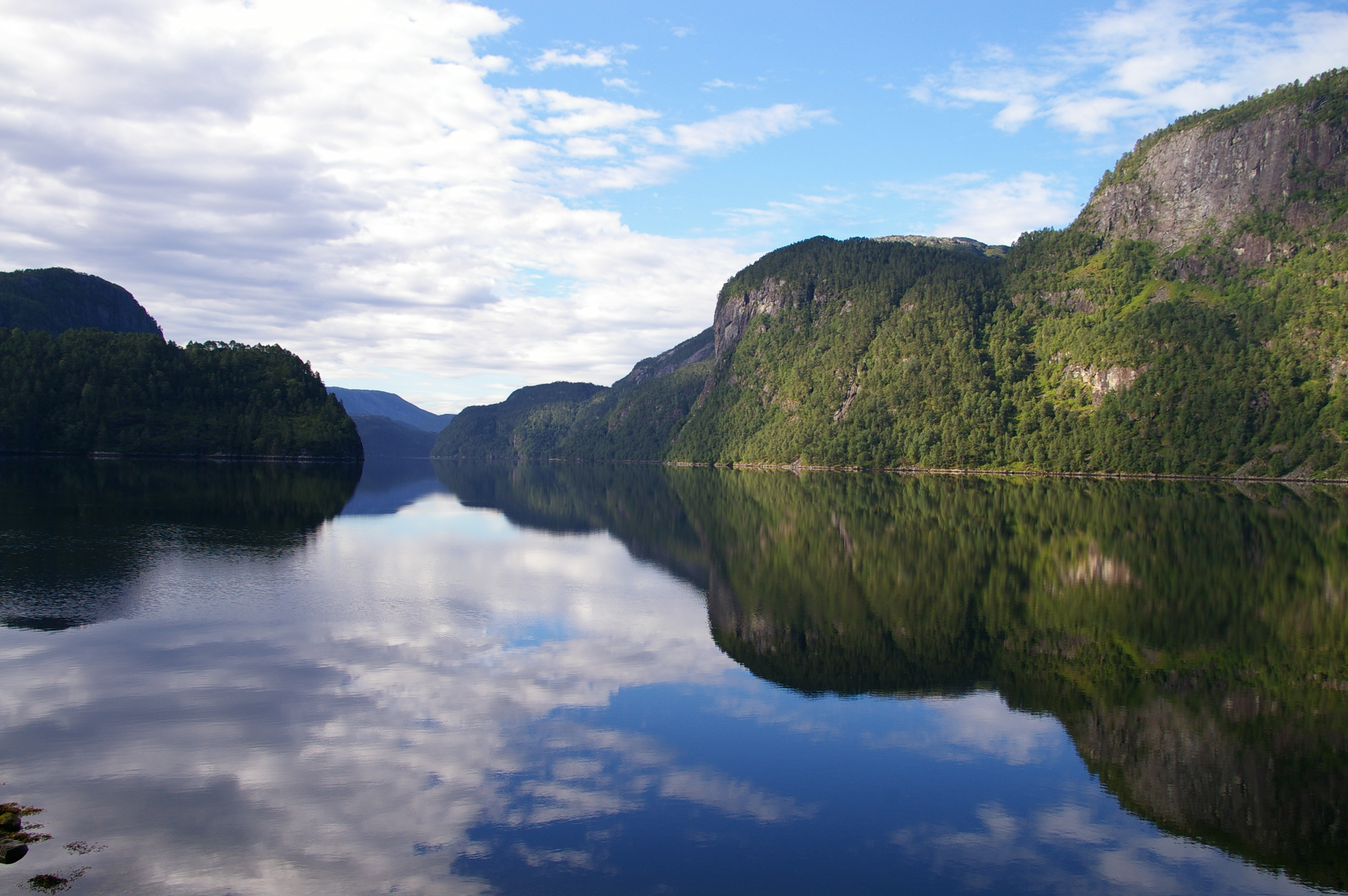
- View of the inner Osterfjorden, north of Osterøy island
- Interactive map of Osterfjorden
- Location: Vestland county, Norway
- Coordinates: 60.5899°N 5.45474°E
- Type: Fjord
- Primary inflows: Romarheimsfjorden
- Basin countries: Norway
- Max. length: 27 kilometres (17 mi)
- Max. width: 1 to 3 km (0.62 to 1.86 mi)
- Max. depth: 639 metres (2,096 ft)

Osterfjorden is a fjord in Vestland county, Norway. The fjord is one of three fjords surrounding the island of Osterøy. The fjord runs along the border of Alver Municipality and Osterøy Municipality. The fjord begins at the Romarheimsfjorden and flows to the west for 27 kilometres (17 mi) before ending near the village of Knarvik at the confluence of four fjords: Osterfjorden, Radfjorden (to the north), Sørfjorden (to the south), and Salhusfjorden (to the west). The Osterfjorden is generally about 1 to 3 kilometres (0.62 to 1.86 mi) wide and the deepest point in the fjord reaches a depth of 639 metres (2,096 ft) below sea level.

The following villages lie along the Osterfjorden: Knarvik, Hamre, Leknes, Eikanger, Hosanger, Fotlandsvåg, Ostereidet, and Tysso. Historically, the old Hosanger Municipality encompassed the land on both sides of the fjord, with the fjord running through the middle of the municipality.

== See also ==
- List of Norwegian fjords
