= Bondebladet (newspaper) =

Norwegian newspaper (1914–1935)

Bondebladet was a Norwegian newspaper published in Voss and Bergen in Hordaland county.

== History and profile ==
Bondebladet was started on 4 March 1914 as an organ for farmers. The paper also supported Landsmål. Already in June 1915 it absorbed Vestlandsbonden. It was first published weekly, then from 1919 three days a week. It was a local newspaper with special care for farmers, but became a regional newspaper in 1921 and a newspaper for the whole Western Norway in 1922. At the same time it was moved to Bergen, became a daily newspaper, and became affiliated with the newly founded Agrarian Party. It did not cope with its own ambitious goals, and went defunct after its last issue on 6 December 1935.
