= Tonje Lavik Pederssen =

Norwegian politician (born 1996)

Deputy Member of the Storting
- Incumbent
- Assumed office 1 October 2025
- Constituency: Akershus

Personal details
- Born: 10 May 1996 (age 29)
- Party: Progress Party

Tonje Lavik Pederssen (born 10 May 1996) is a Norwegian politician who was elected deputy member of the Storting in 2025. She is the group leader of the Progress Party in the municipal council of Asker.
