= Andreas Lavik =

Mayor of Kvinnherad and member of Parliament of Norway

Andreas Johannessen Lavik (18 August 1854 – 18 December 1918) was a Norwegian revivalist, temperance advocate, magazine editor, farmer, headmaster and politician.

== Early life and family ==
He was born in the Eksingedalen valley as a son of farmer Johannes Andersson Lavik and Kari Andersdotter Kyte. He was a brother of journalist and newspaper editor Johannes Lavik and actor and theatre director Dore Lavik. In 1881, he married Margrethe Christine Matthiessen. They had eleven children. Among their sons was jurist and newspaper editor Johannes Lavik. His wife Margrethe was elected as deputy representative to the Parliament of Norway in 1915. He was an uncle of parliamentarian Nils Lavik and journalist Herbrand Lavik.

== Career ==
From 1878 to 1887, Lavik worked as a travelling lay preacher for the organization Bergens Indremisjon. In 1885 he settled in Kvinnherad Municipality. He served as mayor of Kvinnherad Municipality for eight years, and represented the Moderate Liberal Party in Søndre Bergenhus at the Parliament of Norway from 1889 to 1891.

He was a co-founder of Det Vestlandske Indremisjonsforbund in 1898, an organization still active today with about 1,500 local chapters. Lavik served as the organization's first Secretary, and editor of its magazine Sambåndet. He was a member of the Church Commission of 1908. From 1917, he was headmaster of a bible school in Bergen. He published several books, including the song book Sions sange from 1901. A Pietist, he regarded activities such as dancing and cinema as unfavourable ways of socializing.
