= Dore Lavik =

Norwegian actor and theatre director

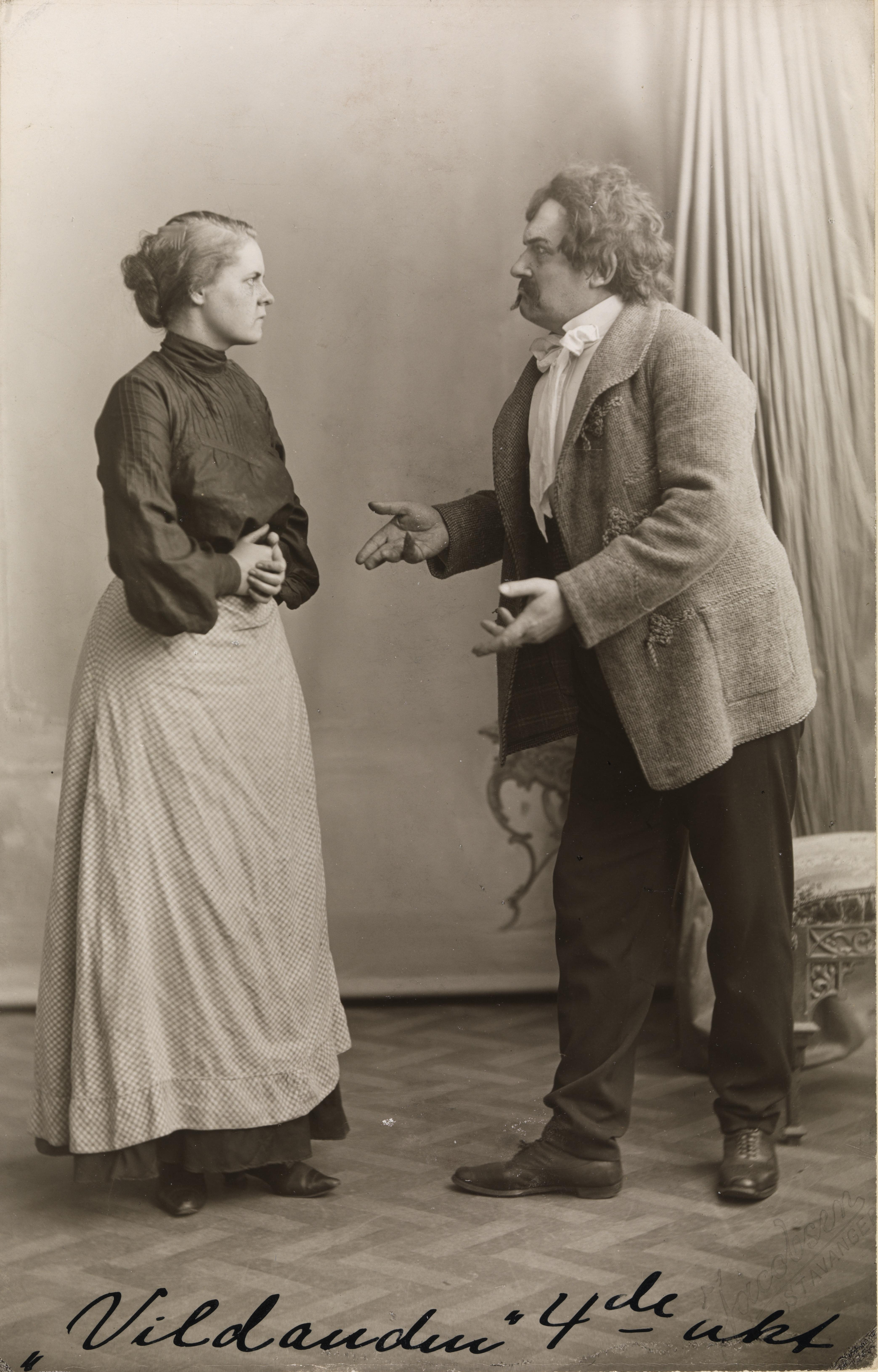
- Marie Hamsun (left) and Dore Lavik (right)
- Born: 4 June 1863; Hosanger, Sweden-Norway
- Died: 18 June 1908 (aged 45)
- Education: University of Oslo
- Occupations: Actor and theatre director
- Spouse: Ludovica Levy

Dorotheus Olivarius Lavik a.k.a. Dore Lavik (4 June 1863 – 18 June 1908) was a Norwegian actor and theatre director. He worked as an actor at Den Nationale Scene in Bergen from 1895, and chaired the theatre Sekondteatret in Kristiania from 1899 to 1901, together with his wife Ludovica Levy.

== Personal life ==
Dore Lavik was born in Hosanger Municipality as the son of farmer Johannes Andersson Lavik and Kari Andersdatter Kyte, and was a brother of Andreas Lavik and Johannes Lavik. He was married to actress and theatre director Ludovica Levy from 1896 to 1906. From 1904 he lived with actress and teacher Anne Marie Andersen, the later wife of Knut Hamsun. He died in Bergen in 1908.

== Career ==
Lavik studied philology at the University of Oslo in the 1880s. He initiated his stage career in 1892 as reciter of poems at Den literære Variété at Christiania Tivoli. He spent two years in the United States from 1892 to 1894, working as insurance agent, agent for the newspaper Skandinaven, and bricklayer's assistant. He returned to Norway in 1894, and was subeditor for the newspaper Social-Demokraten. He made his debut as actor at Den Nationale Scene in Bergen in 1895. His first appearance was as "the friend" in Gustav Esmann's play Magdalene in September 1895, while his actual stage debut was as "Eilert Løvborg" in Ibsen's play Hedda Gabler later the same month. In November he played the character "Laurent" in Zola's Thérèse Raquin, where his later wife Ludovica Levy played the title character. Levy had been appointed as actress and instructor at Den Nationale Scene from 1895. The couple married in 1896. In 1899 they moved to Kristiania, where they founded the theatre Sekondteatret, which they run together until 1901, when Sekondteatret had to close after bankruptcy. He was then director for various touring theatres, including Det Norske Skuespillerselskab. He died while touring in Western Norway in 1908.
