= Johannes Lavik =

Norwegian journalist and newspaper editor

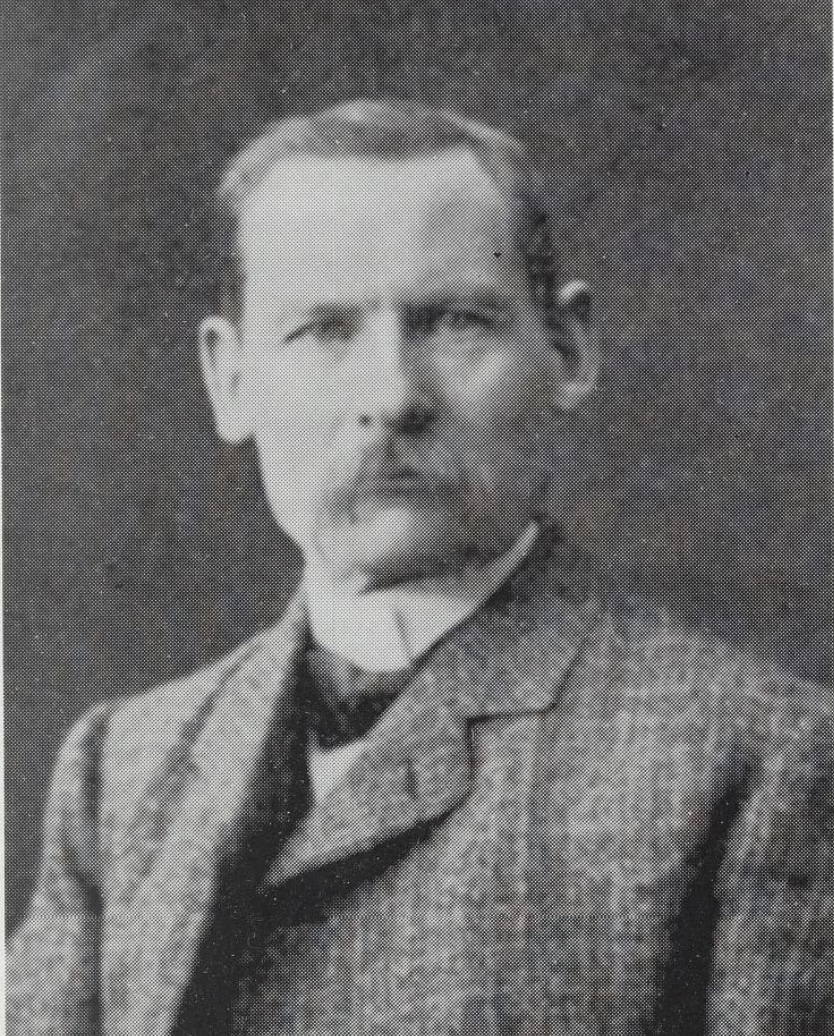
- Johannes Lavik.
- Born: 1 February 1856; Eksingedalen, Sweden-Norway
- Died: 14 February 1929 (aged 73)
- Occupations: Journalist and newspaper editor
- Relatives: Andreas Lavik (brother), Dore Lavik (brother)

Johannes Lavik (1 February 1856, Eksingedalen – 14 February 1929) was a Norwegian journalist and newspaper editor. He was a subeditor of the newspaper Bergens Tidende from 1894. He was a founder and editor of the Nynorsk newspaper Gula Tidend from 1904. He edited Bondebladet from 1919 to 1925.

Johannes Lavik was a brother of Member of Parliament Andreas Lavik and actor Dore Lavik.
