= Nils Lavik =

Norwegian politician

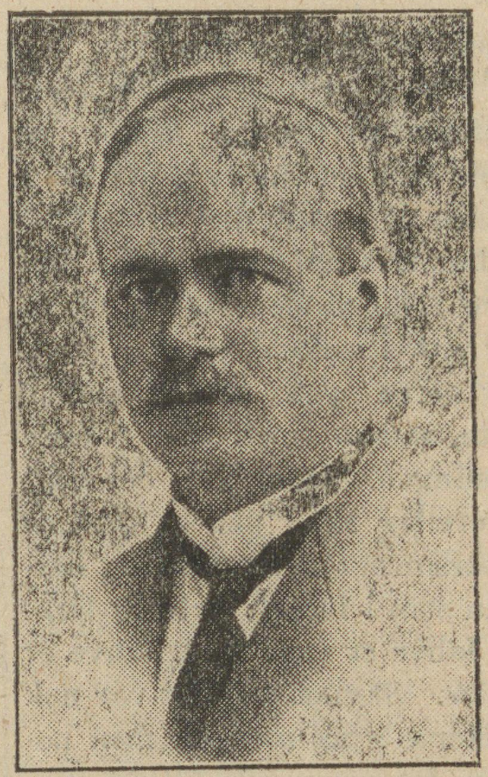
Nils Lavik

Nils Andresson Lavik (8 January 1884 – 14 July 1966) was a Norwegian politician for the Christian Democratic Party.

He was born in the old Hosanger Municipality in Hordaland County, Norway. Originally a member of the Liberal Party, he eventually joined the Christian Democratic Party who broke out of the Liberal Party in 1933. He was elected to the Norwegian Parliament from Hordaland in 1934, and was re-elected on three occasions. He had previously served in the position of deputy representative for the Liberal Party during the term 1930–1933. He was chairman of the Christian Democratic Party 1938–1951. Lavik served in the Norwegian Parliament until 1953.
