= Hordaland =

County of Norway (1763–2020)

Hordaland County Hordaland fylke
- Former County
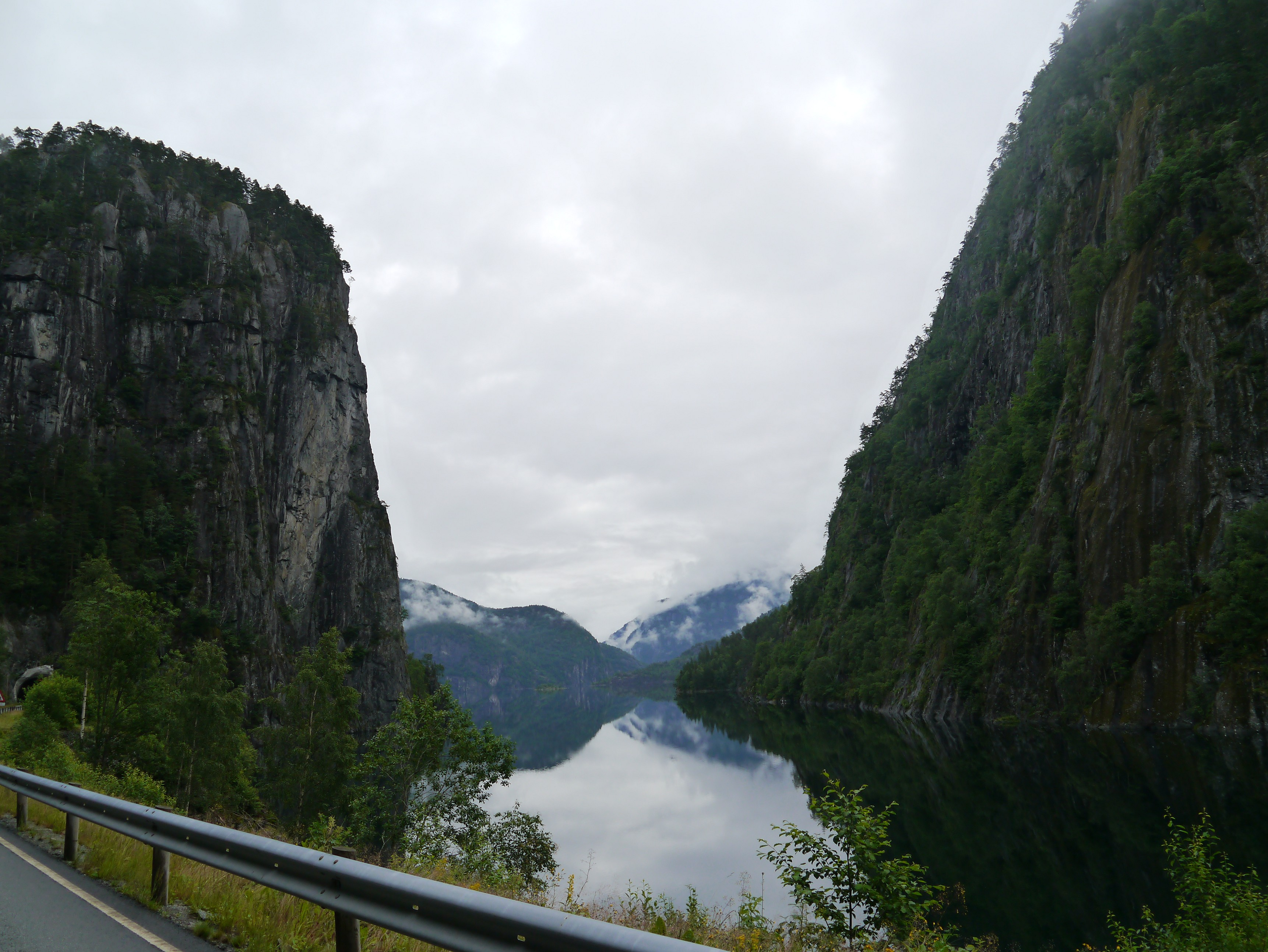
- Hardangerfjord in July 2012

- Flag Coat of arms

- Location within Hordaland Location within Norway
- Coordinates: 60°15′N 06°00′E
- Country: Norway
- County: Hordaland
- District: Western Norway
- Established: 1763
  - Preceded by: Bergenhus amt
- Disestablished: 1 Jan 2020
  - Succeeded by: Vestland county
- Administrative centre: Bergen

Government
  - Body: Hordaland County Municipality
  - Governor (2010-2019): Lars Sponheim (V)
  - County mayor (2015-2019): Anne Gine Hestetun (Ap)

Area (upon dissolution)
  - Total: 15,460 km^{2} (5,970 sq mi)
  - Land: 14,551 km^{2} (5,618 sq mi)
  - Water: 909 km^{2} (351 sq mi) 5.9%
  - Rank: #9 in Norway

Population (2014)
  - Total: 508,500
  - Rank: #3 in Norway
  - Density: 34.95/km^{2} (90.51/sq mi)
  - Change (10 years): ▲ +7.9%
- Demonym: Hordalending

Official language
  - Norwegian form: Nynorsk
- Time zone: UTC+01:00 (CET)
  - Summer (DST): UTC+02:00 (CEST)
- ISO 3166 code: NO-12
- Income (per capita): 148,000 kr (2001)
- GDP (per capita): 263,000 kr (2001)
- GDP national rank: #2 in Norway (7.55% of country)

Hordaland (Urban East Norwegian: [ˈhɔ̂rdɑlɑn]) was a county in Norway, bordering Sogn og Fjordane, Buskerud, Telemark, and Rogaland counties. Hordaland was the third largest county, after Akershus and Oslo, by population. The county government was the Hordaland County Municipality, which is located in Bergen. Before 1972, the city of Bergen was its own separate county, apart from Hordaland. On 1 January 2020, the county was merged with neighbouring Sogn og Fjordane county, to form the new Vestland county.

== Name and symbols ==
=== Name ===
Hordaland (Old Norse: Hǫrðaland) is the old name of the region which was revived in 1919. The first element is genitive plural of Old Norse hǫrðr (plural hǫrðar), the name of the tribe that inhabited the area, which can be reconstructed as Proto-Germanic *haruðōz (see also Charudes for possible more ancient connections). The last element is land which means 'land' or 'region' in Old Norse as well as in the modern Norwegian language.

Until 1919 the name of the county was Søndre Bergenhus amt which meant '(the) southern (part of) Bergenhus amt'. (The old Bergenhus amt was created in 1662 and was divided into Northern and Southern parts in 1763.)

=== Flag ===
The flag of Hordaland

Hordaland's flag shows two axes and a crown in gold on a red field. The flag is a banner of the coat of arms derived from the old seal of the guild of St. Olav from Onarheim in Tysnes Municipality. This seal was used by the delegates of Sunnhordland in 1344 on the document to install king Haakon V of Norway. It was thus the oldest symbol used for the region and adapted as the arms and flag in 1961. The symbols refer to the patron saint of the guild, Saint Olav, King of Norway, whose symbol is an axe.

=== Coat of arms ===
The coat-of-arms were officially granted on 1 December 1961. They were designed by Magnus Hardeland, but the general design had been originally used in the Sunnhordland region during the 14th century. In the early 20th century, leaders of the county began using the old arms as a symbol for the county once again. The arms are on a red background and consist of two golden axes that are crossed with a golden crown above them.

== History ==
Historical population
Year	Pop.	±%
1769	63,757	—
1900	205,771	+222.7%
1950	308,164	+49.8%
1960	338,265	+9.8%
1970	369,430	+9.2%
1980	388,084	+5.0%
1990	407,427	+5.0%
2000	435,219	+6.8%
2010	477,175	+9.6%
2014	508,500	+6.6%
Source: Statistics Norway.

Religion in Hordaland
religion	percent
Christianity	87.34%
Islam	0.77%
Buddhism	0.22%
Other	11.67%

Hordaland county had been around for more than one thousand years. In the 7th century, the area was made up of many petty kingdoms under the Gulating and was known as Hordafylke from around the year 900. In the early 16th century, Norway was divided into four len. The Bergenhus len was headquartered in Bergen and encompassed much of western and northern Norway.

In 1662, the lens were replaced by amts. Bergenhus amt originally consisted of the present-day areas of Hordaland, Sogn og Fjordane, and Sunnmøre and the far northern Nordlandene amt was subordinate to Bergenhus. In the 1680s, Nordlandene and Sunnmøre were split from Bergenhus. In 1763, the amt was divided into northern and southern parts: Nordre Bergenhus amt and Søndre Bergenhus amt. When the amt was split, the present-day Gulen Municipality was split with the southern part ending up in Søndre Bergenhus amt. In 1773, the border was re-drawn so that all of Gulen was located in the northern part. Søndre Bergenhus amt was renamed Hordaland fylke in 1919.

The city of Bergen was classified as a city-county (byamt) from 1831 to 1972. During that time in 1915, Årstad Municipality was annexed into Bergen. In 1972, the neighbouring municipalities of Arna, Fana, Laksevåg and Åsane were annexed into the city of Bergen, creating a much larger Bergen Municipality. Also at that same time, the city of Bergen lost its county status, and became a part of Hordaland county.

== Government ==
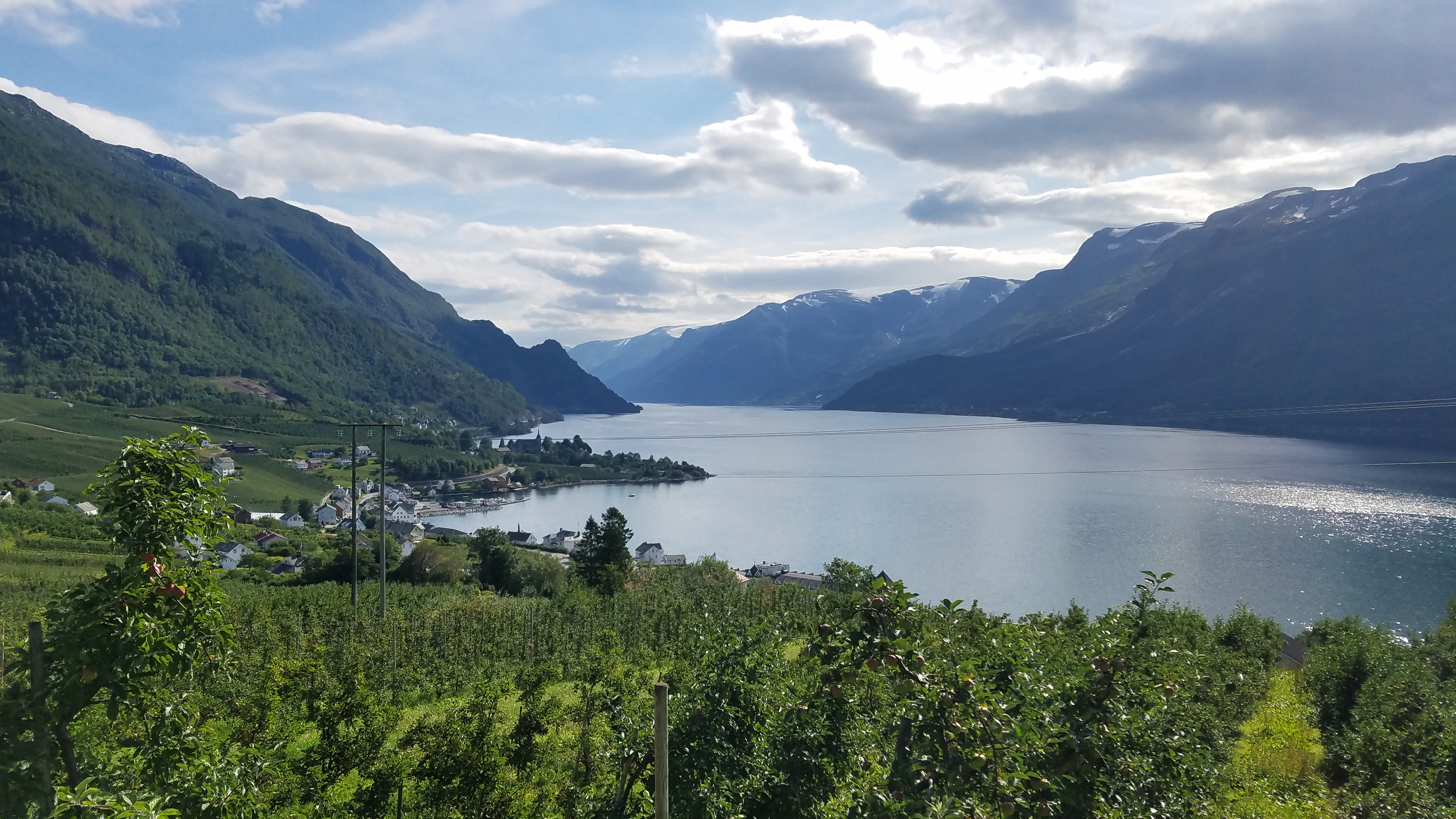
Hardanger is one of Norway's most important sources of fruit, providing approximately 40% of the country's fruit production, including apples, plums, pears, cherries, and redcurrants.

A county (fylke) is the chief local administrative area in Norway. The whole country is divided into 19 counties. A county is also an election area, with popular votes taking place every 4 years. In Hordaland, the government of the county was the Hordaland County Municipality. It included 57 members elected to form a county council (Fylkesting). Heading the Fylkesting was the county mayor (fylkesordførar). The last county mayor for the Hordaland County Municipality was Anne Gine Hestetun.

The county also had a County Governor (fylkesmann) who was the representative of the King and Government of Norway. Lars Sponheim was the last County Governor of Hordaland. The municipalities in Hordaland were divided among four district courts (tingrett): Nordhordland, Sunnhordland, Bergen, and Hardanger. Hordaland was also part of the Gulating Court of Appeal district based in Bergen.

- Nordhordland District Court: Askøy, Austevoll, Austrheim, Fedje, Fjell, Fusa, Lindås, Masfjorden, Meland, Modalen, Os, Osterøy, Radøy, Samnanger, Sund, Vaksdal, Voss, Øygarden, and Gulen (Gulen was actually in neighbouring Sogn og Fjordane county)
- Sunnhordland District Court: Bømlo, Etne, Fitjar, Kvinnherad, Stord, Sveio, and Tysnes
- Bergen District Court: the city of Bergen
- Hardanger District Court: Eidfjord, Granvin, Jondal, Kvam, Odda, Ullensvang, and Ulvik

Most of the municipalities in Hordaland were part of the Hordaland police district. Gulen Municipality and Solund Municipality in Sogn og Fjordane county were also part of the Hordaland police district. Bømlo, Etne, Fitjar, Stord and Sveio were a part of the "Haugaland and Sunnhordland" police district, along with eight other municipalities in Rogaland county.

== Geography ==
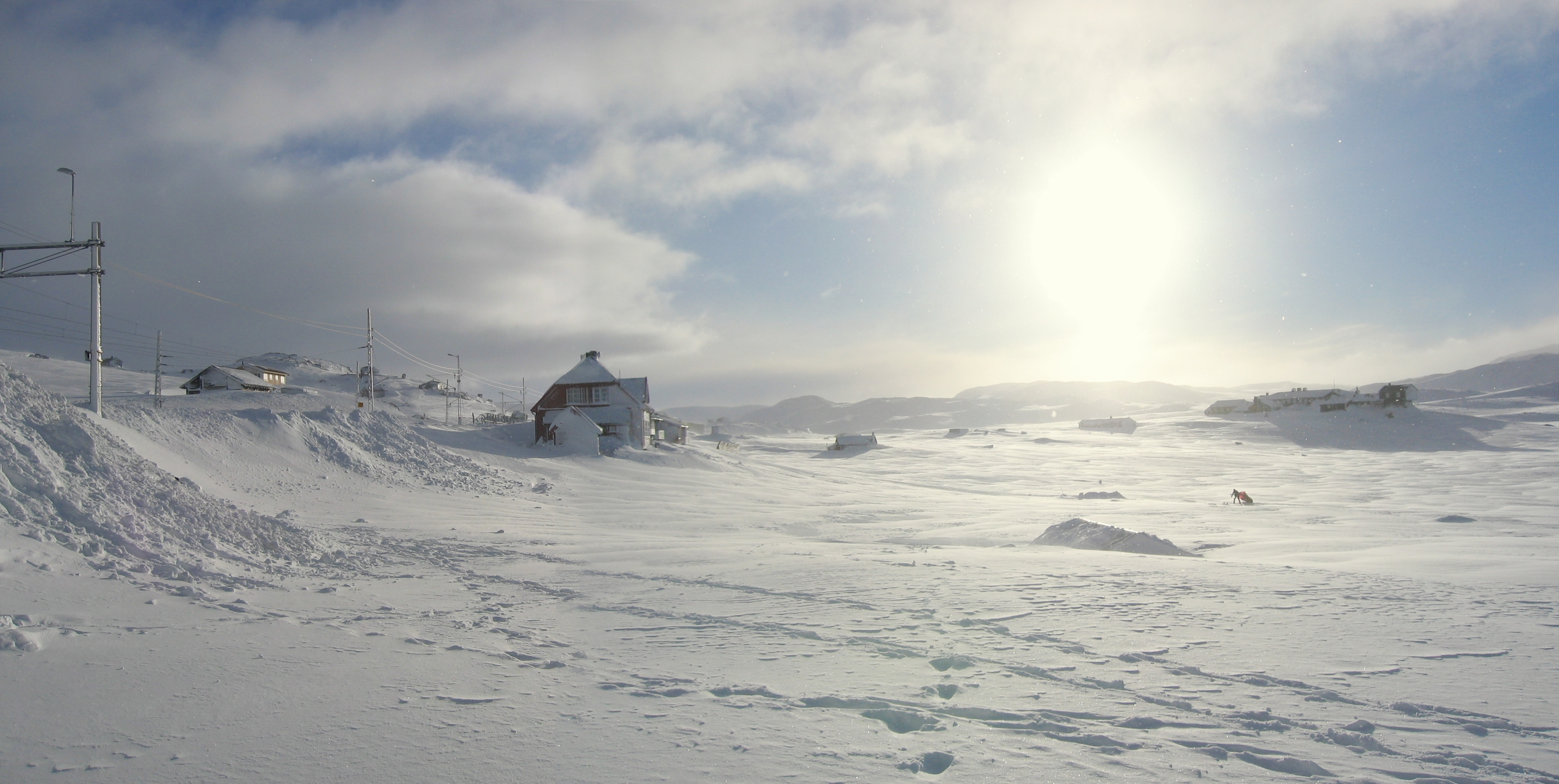
Finse is the highest point of the Norwegian Railway System, located at 1,222 m (4,009 ft) above sea level.

Hordaland is semi-circular in shape. It is located on the western coast of Norway, split from southwest to northeast by the long, deep Hardangerfjorden, one of Norway's main fjords and a great tourist attraction. About half of the National park of Hardangervidda is in this county. The county also includes many well-known waterfalls, such as Vøringsfossen and Stykkjedalsfossen. It also includes the Folgefonna and Hardangerjøkulen glaciers.

More than 60% of the inhabitants lived in Bergen Municipality and the surrounding area. Other urban or semi-urban centres include Leirvik, Vossavangen, and Odda.

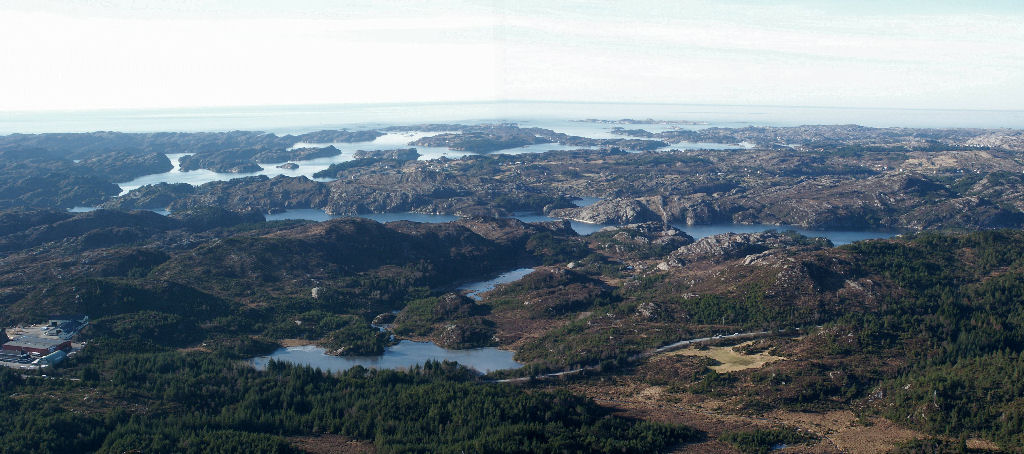
Panorama over the island of Sotra.

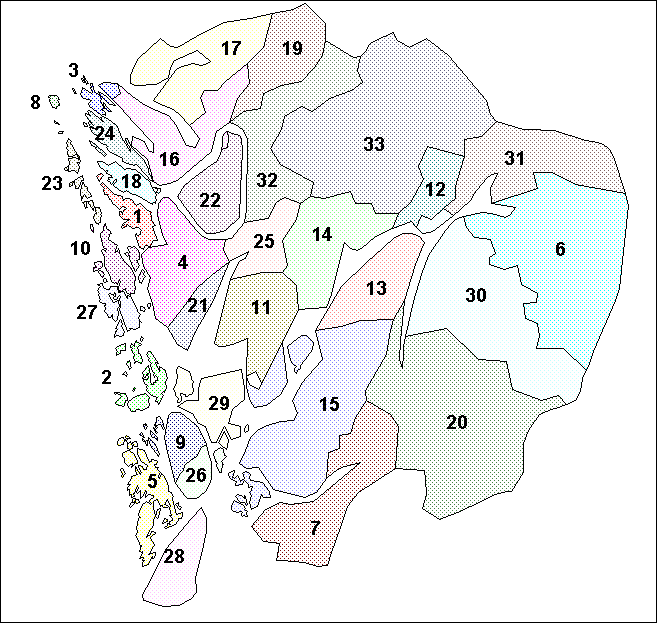
Location of Oppland Municipalities

== Municipalities ==
1. Askøy Municipality
2. Austevoll Municipality
3. Austrheim Municipality
4. Bergen Municipality
5. Bømlo Municipality
6. Eidfjord Municipality
7. Etne Municipality
8. Fedje Municipality
9. Fitjar Municipality
10. Fjell Municipality
11. Fusa Municipality
12. Granvin Municipality
13. Jondal Municipality
14. Kvam Municipality
15. Kvinnherad Municipality
16. Lindås Municipality
17. Masfjorden Municipality
18. Meland Municipality
19. Modalen Municipality
20. Odda Municipality
21. Os Municipality
22. Osterøy Municipality
23. Øygarden Municipality
24. Radøy Municipality
25. Samnanger Municipality
26. Stord Municipality
27. Sund Municipality
28. Sveio Municipality
29. Tysnes Municipality
30. Ullensvang Municipality
31. Ulvik Municipality
32. Vaksdal Municipality
33. Voss Municipality

== Districts ==
- Hardanger
- Haugaland
- Mauranger
- Midhordland
- Nordhordland
- Stril
- Strilelandet
- Sunnhordland
- Voss

== Cities ==
- Bergen
- Leirvik
- Odda

== Parishes ==
- Alversund
- Arna
- Ask
- Askøy
- Austevoll
- Austrheim
- Bekkjarvik
- Bergen
- Bergsdalen
- Birkeland
- Biskopshavn
- Bjoastrand
- Blomvåg
- Bremnes
- Bruvik
- Bømlo
- Old Bømlo
- Bønes
- Dale
- Eid
- Eidfjord
- Old Eidfjord
- Eidsvåg
- Eksingedal
- Emigrant
- Erdal
- Etne
- Evanger
- Fana
- Fedje
- Finnås
- Fitjar
- Fjelberg
- Fjell
- Fjæra
- Foldnes
- Førde
- Fridalen
- Frøyset
- Fusa
- Fyllingsdalen
- Gjerde
- Gjerstad
- Granvin
- Grindheim
- Haga
- Hamre
- Hatlestrand
- Haus
- Herdla (Herlø)
- Hjelme
- Old Hjelme
- Holdhus
- Holmedal
- Holy Cross
- Hordabø (Bøe)
- Hosanger
- Hundvin
- Hundvåkøy
- Husnes
- Hålandsdal
- Jondal
- Kausland
- Kinsarvik
- Knarvik
- Kvam
- Kvinnherad
- Laksevåg
- Landro
- Landås
- Lindås
- Loddefjord
- Lygra
- Lykling
- Manger
- Masfjorden
- Meland
- Mjelde
- Mo
- Moster
- Old Moster
- Myking
- Møkster
- Nesheim
- Nore Neset Church
- Norheimsund
- Nygård
- Nykirken
- Nysæter
- Odda
- Olsvik
- Onarheim
- Opdal (Uggdal)
- Oppheim
- Os
- Ostereidet
- Raundalen
- Reksteren
- Røldal (before 1848 in Rogaland)
- Salhus
- Samnanger
- Sandnes
- Sandvik
- Seim
- Skare
- Skjold
- Skånevik
- Slettebakken
- Solheim, Bergen
- Solheim, Masfjorden
- St James's
- St George's
- St John's
- St Mark's
- St Mary's
- Stamnes
- Stord
- Store-Kalsøy
- Storetveit
- Strandebarm
- Strandvik
- Strudshavn
- Strusshamn
- Stødle
- Støle (Strødle)
- Sund
- Sundvor
- Sveio
- Sæbø
- Sælen
- Søreide
- Takvam
- Tveit
- Tysnes
- Tyssedal
- Uggdal
- Ullensvang
- Ulvik
- Uppheim
- Uskedalen
- Utne
- Vaksdal
- Valen
- Valen
- Valestrand
- Varaldsøy
- Vike
- Vikebygd
- Vikøy
- Vinje
- Voss
- Vossestrand
- Ytre Arna
- Ytrebygda
- Ænes
- Ølen
- Ølve
- Øystese
- Åkra (Åkre)
- Ålvik
- Årstad
- Åsane

== Villages ==
- Abbedisso
- Algrøyna
- Alsåker
- Alveim
- Alver
- Alverstraumen
- Ask
- Askeland, Lindås
- Askeland, Radøy
- Auklandshamn (Økland)
- Austbygdi
- Austevollhella
- Austmarka
- Austrepollen
- Austrheim
- Bakkasund
- Bekkjarvik
- Birkeland
- Blomvåg
- Bolstadøyri
- Borstrondi
- Botnen
- Breistein
- Bru (Strandebarm)
- Bruvik
- Bøvågen
- Dale (Dalekvam)
- Dalegarden
- Dimmelsvik
- Djønno
- Eidfjord
- Eidsvik
- Eikelandsosen
- Eitrheim
- Erdal
- Espeland
- Etnesjøen (Etne)
- Evanger
- Fanahammeren (Fana)
- Fedje
- Finse
- Fitjar
- Fjelberg
- Fjell
- Fjæra
- Flatkvål
- Flesland
- Foldnes
- Fotlandsvåg
- Frekhaug
- Fusa
- Fyllingsdalen
- Førde i Hordaland
- Gjermundshamn Ferry Port
- Gjetingsdalen
- Granvin
- Grov
- Haga
- Hagavik
- Haljem
- Hammarsland
- Hamre
- Hanevik
- Hatlestrand
- Haugland
- Haukanes
- Haus
- Havrå
- Helle
- Hernar
- Herøysund
- Hjartås
- Hjellestad
- Holdhus
- Holme
- Holmefjord
- Horda
- Hosanger
- Hundvin
- Husa
- Husavik
- Husnes
- Hylkje
- Høylandsbygda
- Indre Arna
- Indre Ålvik
- Io
- Isdalstø
- Jondal
- Kaland
- Kausland
- Kinsarvik
- Kjøkkelvik
- Kleppestø
- Klokkarvik
- Knappskog
- Knarrevik
- Knarrevik (Knarvrika)
- Kolbeinsvik
- Kolltveit
- Krokeidet
- Krossneset
- Kvitheim
- Kysnesstranda
- Laksevåg
- Landro
- Langevåg
- Lindås
- Litlabø
- Loddefjord
- Lofthus
- Lonevåg
- Luro
- Lykling
- Manger
- Masfjordnes
- Mathopen
- Meland
- Milde
- Misje
- Mo (Modalen)
- Mongstad
- Moster
- Mosterhamn
- Møvik
- Mundheim
- Møkster
- Nedre Vinjo
- Nesheim
- Nesttun
- Nord-Huglo
- Nordrepollen
- Nordvik
- Norheimsund
- Onarheim
- Osa
- Ostereidet
- Osøyro
- Reksteren
- Ringøy
- Rong
- Rosendal
- Rossland
- Rostøy
- Rubbestadneset
- Røldal
- Sagvåg
- Salhus
- Seim
- Sekkingstad
- Seljestad
- Skare (Skarde)
- Skjelviki
- Skogsvåg
- Skånevik
- Sletta
- Stalheim
- Stamneshella
- Stanghelle
- Steine
- Storebø
- Strandvik
- Straume
- Strusshamn
- Sunndal
- Sunde i Sunnhordland
- Sveio
- Svortland
- Sylta
- Sæbø (Sæbøvågen)
- Sæbøvik
- Søfteland
- Søre Øyane
- Sør-Huglo
- Søvik
- Toska
- Trengereid
- Tunes
- Turøyna
- Tveitevåg
- Tysse
- Tyssedal
- Tælavåg
- Tørvikbygd
- Uggdal
- Uggdalseidet
- Ulvik
- Uskedal
- Utne
- Utsylta
- Utåker
- Valen
- Valestrand
- Valestrandfossen
- Valevåg
- Vaksdal
- Varaldsøy
- Vikadal
- Vikavågen
- Vikebygd
- Vikøy
- Vinnes
- Vossevangen
- Våga
- Våge
- Våge
- Ytre Arna
- Ytre Ålvik
- Ænes
- Ølve
- Øvre Eidfjord
- Øystese
- Ågotnes
- Åkra
- Årland
- Årland
- Årås

== Former municipalities ==
- Alversund Municipality
- Arna Municipality
- Bergen landdistrikt
- Bremnes Municipality
- Bruvik Municipality
- Eid Municipality
- Evanger Municipality
- Fana Municipality
- Finnås Municipality
- Fjelberg Municipality
- Hamre Municipality
- Haus Municipality
- Herdla Municipality
- Hjelme Municipality
- Hordabø Municipality
- Hosanger Municipality
- Hålandsdal Municipality
- Kinsarvik Municipality
- Laksevåg Municipality
- Manger Municipality
- Moster Municipality
- Mosterøy Municipality
- Røldal Municipality
- Skånevik Municipality
- Strandebarm Municipality
- Strandvik Municipality
- Sæbø Municipality
- Valestrand Municipality
- Varaldsøy Municipality
- Vikebygd Municipality
- Vossestrand Municipality
- Ølen Municipality
- Årstad Municipality
- Åsane Municipality

== International relations ==
=== Twin towns – Sister cities ===
Hordaland county is twinned with:

- Lower Normandy, France
- Kaunas, Lithuania
- Cardiff, Wales
- Orkney Islands, Northern Isles, Scotland

=== Christmas Tree ===
Since 1949 Hordaland has given a Christmas tree to the Scottish Capital city of Edinburgh this is to remember the help given to Norwegians during World War II by Scots however since 2008 the tree has been sourced in Scotland but has remained a gift from the people of Hordaland.

== Notable people ==
- Ole Bull (1810–1880), a composer and violinist
- Tore Eikeland (1990–2011), a politician
- Edvard Grieg (1843–1907), a composer
- Nordahl Grieg (1902–1943), a writer
- C. J. Hambro (1885–1964), a politician
- Julius Christopher Hammer (1798–1877), a priest and politician
- Ludvig Holberg (1684–1754), a writer
- Leif Andreas Larsen ("Shetlands-Larsen") (1906–1990), a military officer in World War II
- Christian Michelsen (1857–1925), a politician
- Johan Sebastian Welhaven (1807–1873), a writer
- Kyrre Gørvell-Dahll (1991-presents), a DJ and musician
- Alan Olav Walker (1997- presents), a DJ and musician
