= Møkster =

Island in Vestland, Norway

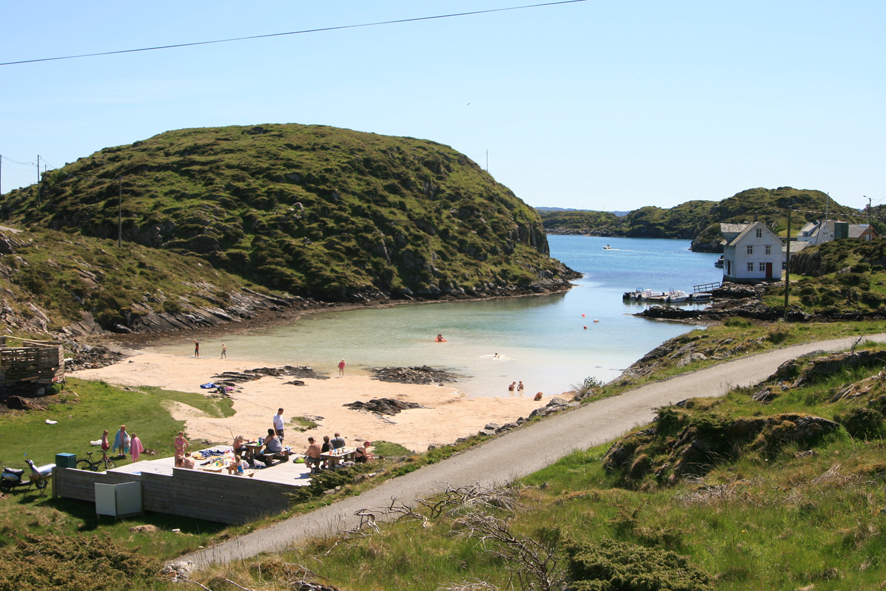
- View of a beach on Møkster
- Interactive map of Møkster

Geography
- Location: Vestland, Norway
- Coordinates: 60.0689°N 5.0896°E
- Archipelago: Austevoll
- Area: 1.4 km^{2} (0.54 sq mi)
- Length: 1.9 km (1.18 mi)
- Width: 1.2 km (0.75 mi)
- Highest elevation: 36 m (118 ft)

Administration
- Norway
- County: Vestland
- Municipality: Austevoll Municipality

Demographics
- Population: 33 (2025)

Møkster is an island in Austevoll Municipality in Vestland county, Norway. The 1.4-square-kilometre (350-acre) island lies in an archipelago and it sits north of the islands of Litlakalsøy, Stolmen, and Selbjørn; west of the islands of Drøna and Rostøya; and south of the islands of Horga, Storakalsøy and Hundvåko. The island had 33 inhabitants in 2025.

The island lies in the central part of the Austevoll archipelago, and as such, it was an important location for the sea-faring people who historically populated the region. Møkster Church was located on the island from the Middle Ages until 1892 when it was torn down and the church was moved to the larger island of Stolmen to the south (where it is still located today).

== Notable people ==
- Abelone Møgster (1883-1975), a businesswoman and war resister in World War II

== See also ==
- List of islands of Norway
