= Austevoll =

Austevoll may refer to:

== Places ==
- Austevoll Municipality, a municipality (and archipelago) in Vestland county, Norway
- Austevoll, or Austevollshella, a village within Austevoll Municipality in Vestland county, Norway
- Austevoll Church, a church in Austevoll Municipality in Vestland county, Norway

== Other ==
- Elin Austevoll (born 1974), a Norwegian swimmer
- Austevoll Seafood, a major Norwegian seafood company
