= Loddo =

Mountain in Vestland, Norway

- Løddo (unofficial)

Highest point
- Elevation: 243 m (797 ft)
- Prominence: 243 m (797 ft)
- Isolation: 4.7 km (2.9 mi)
- Coordinates: 60.05009°N 5.28148°E

Geography
- Location: Vestland, Norway

Loddo is a mountain in Austevoll Municipality in Hordaland county, Norway. The 243-metre (797 ft) tall mountain is located on the island of Huftarøy and it is the highest point in the municipality. The mountain is located near the southeast coast of the island, about 2 kilometres (1.2 mi) northwest of the coastal village of Otterå.

== See also ==
- List of mountains of Norway
