= Hundvåkøy Church =

Church in Vestland, Norway

- Hundvåkøy kirke
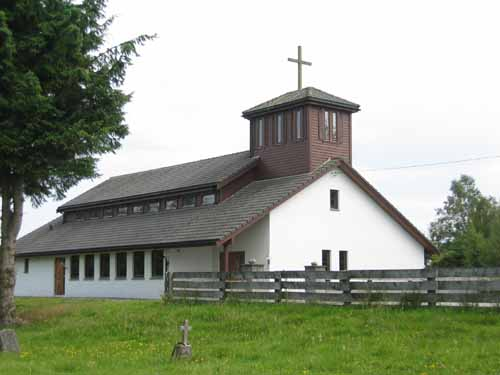
- View of the church
- Hundvåkøy Church
- 60°06′17″N 5°10′11″E
- Location: Austevoll Municipality, Vestland
- Country: Norway
- Denomination: Church of Norway
- Churchmanship: Evangelical Lutheran

History
- Status: Chapel
- Founded: 1990
- Consecrated: 1990

Architecture
- Functional status: Active
- Architect: Planconsult A/S
- Architectural type: Long church
- Completed: 1990 (36 years ago)

Specifications
- Materials: Concrete and wood

Administration
- Diocese: Bjørgvin bispedømme
- Deanery: Fana prosti
- Parish: Austevoll

Hundvåkøy Church (Norwegian: Hundvåkøy kirke) is an annex chapel of the Church of Norway in Austevoll Municipality in Vestland county, Norway. It is located in the village of Austevollshella on the island of Hundvåko. It is one of the five churches for the Austevoll parish which is part of the Fana prosti (deanery) in the Diocese of Bjørgvin. The white, concrete and wood chapel was built in a long church design in 1990 using plans drawn up by the architectural firm Planconsult based in Storebø. The chapel seats about 220 people.

== History ==
Austevoll Church was located on the island of Hundvåko for over 200 years before it was moved to the village of Storebø on a nearby island in 1891. The people living at the old church site were not happy about losing their local church. In the 1960s, planning began to build an annex chapel at the site of the old church. After lots of planning and fundraising, work on the new chapel began in 1989. The architectural firm Planconsult A/S was hired to design the new chapel. Nearly 100 years later, in 1990, a new chapel was completed on the old church site on Hundvåko.

== See also ==
- List of churches in Bjørgvin
