= Litlakalsøy =

Island in Vestland, Norway

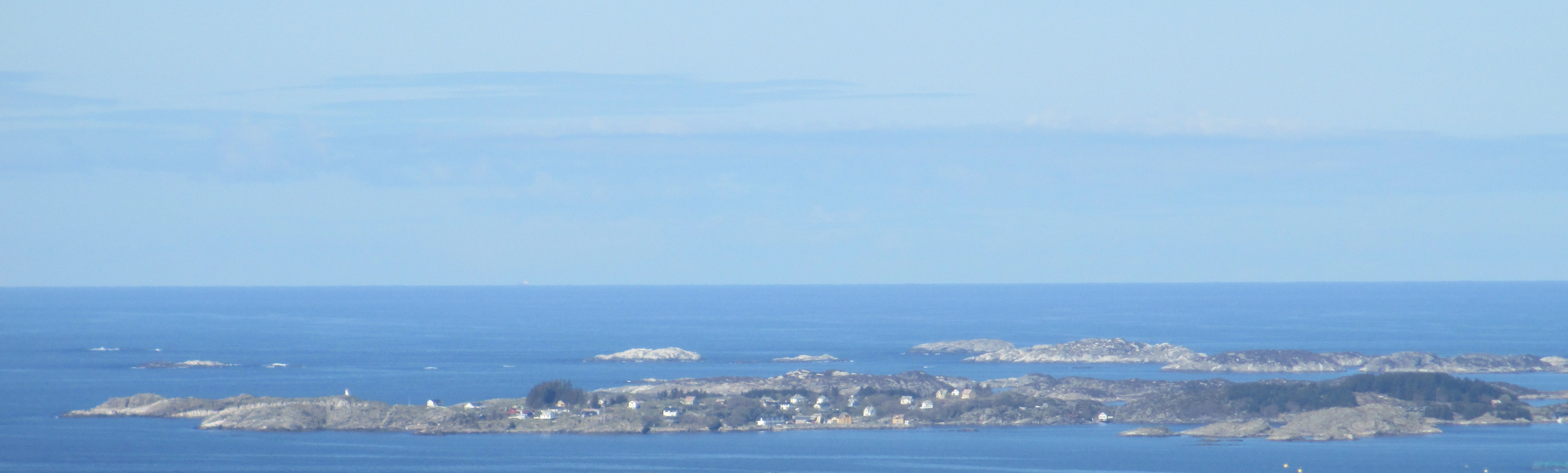
- Interactive map of Litlakalsøy

Geography
- Location: Vestland, Norway
- Coordinates: 60.0407°N 5.0796°E
- Archipelago: Austevoll
- Area: 0.5 km^{2} (0.19 sq mi)
- Length: 1.4 km (0.87 mi)
- Width: 625 m (2051 ft)
- Coastline: 3.5 km (2.17 mi)
- Highest elevation: 30 m (100 ft)

Administration
- Norway
- County: Vestland
- Municipality: Austevoll Municipality

Demographics
- Population: 26 (2001)

Litlakalsøy is an island in Austevoll Municipality in Vestland county, Norway. The 0.5-square-kilometre (120-acre) island lies in the Austevoll archipelago. It sits in the Møkstrafjorden south of the island of Møkster, north of the island of Stolmen, and west of the large island of Huftarøy. The island had 26 inhabitants in 2001. The island is only accessible by boat.

== See also ==
- List of islands of Norway
