= Inge Bjarne Storebø =

Norwegian politician (1947–2001)

Inge Bjarne Storebø (26 June 1947 – 4 February 2001) was a Norwegian politician for the Conservative Party, and mayor of Austevoll Municipality from 1989 to 2001. He was the son of Rikard Storebø, who served as mayor of Austevoll for the Liberal Party from 1960 to 1969.

== Background ==
Storebø was born and grew up in Austevoll, an island municipality south-west of Bergen. His father, Rikard Storebø, was mayor of Austevoll from 1960 to 1969. Inge Storebø held an artium from Bergen Handelsgymnasium and a degree in business economics from the Norwegian School of Management.

He married Signe Elise Storebø (née Strand) in 1978. They had six children, Ann May (born 1976), Roald (1979), Katrine (1980), Tom (1982), Morten (1983) and Elise (1987).

== Political career ==
He entered politics as the main candidate for the local conservative party in 1987. His party won the election and joined a coalition with the Christian Democratic Party. Storebø served as deputy mayor the first half of his four-year term (1987–1989), before he was elected mayor by the municipal council in 1989. He was the main candidate for the Conservative Party in 1991, 1995 and 1999. He held the office as mayor until his death in 2001.

He was recognised as a prominent mayor from Western Norway. The county governor in Hordaland wrote in Storebø's obituary that "He was one of the most significant mayors in Hordaland, and he was a reason for the good cooperation between the municipal and county level in Hordaland."

== Death ==
On 4 February 2001 the home of Storebø caught fire. Storebø managed to notify the fire department, before reentering the building to try to put the fire out himself. As the fire spread he did not manage to escape, and his body was found the next day. The cause of death was suffocation. He was survived by his wife and their six children.
