= Lunnøya =

Island in Vestland, Norway

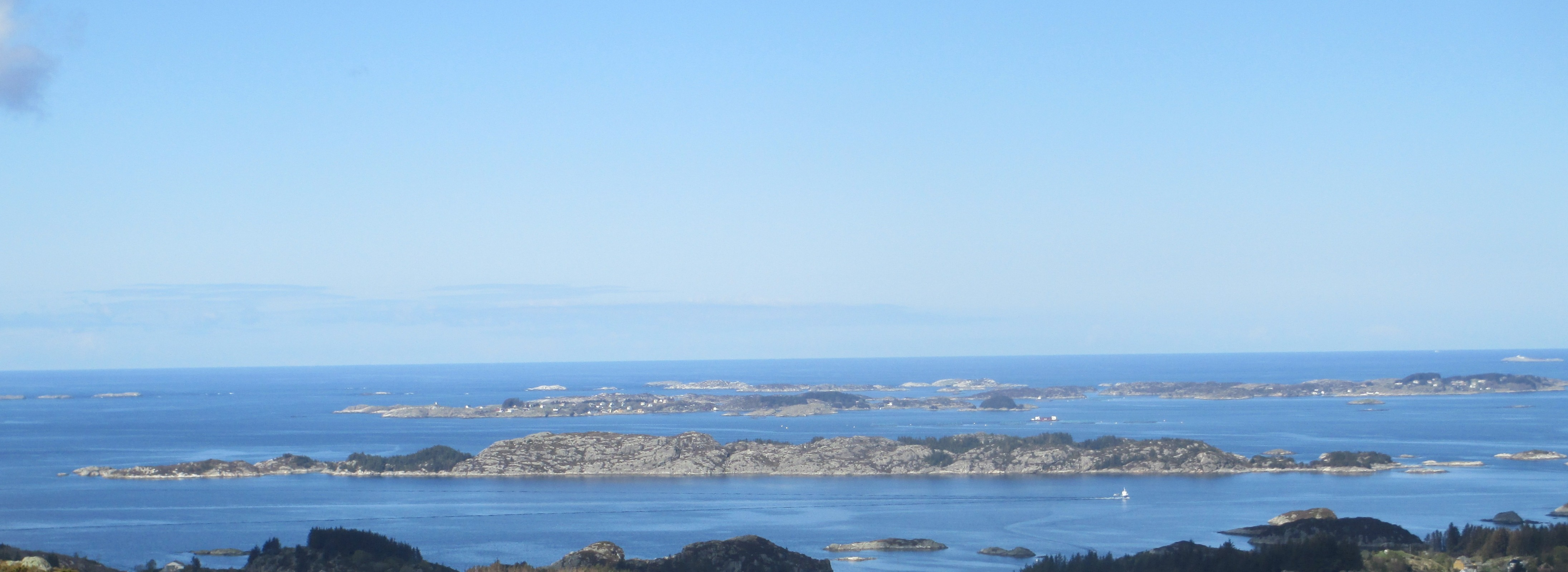
- Interactive map of the island

Geography
- Location: Vestland, Norway
- Coordinates: 60.02389°N 5.13526°E
- Archipelago: Austevoll
- Area: 0.6 km^{2} (0.23 sq mi)
- Length: 1.2 km (0.75 mi)
- Width: 750 m (2460 ft)

Administration
- Norway
- County: Vestland
- Municipality: Austevoll Municipality

Demographics
- Population: 10 (2001)

Lunnøya is an island in Austevoll Municipality in Vestland county, Norway. The 0.6-square-kilometre (150-acre) island lies in the Møkstrafjorden just north of the larger island of Selbjørn. In 2001, ten people lived on the island.. The population has continued to decline and now the island is primarily used for holiday cabins, but few or no permanent residents living on the island.

== See also ==
- List of islands of Norway
