= Stolmen =

Island in Vestland, Norway

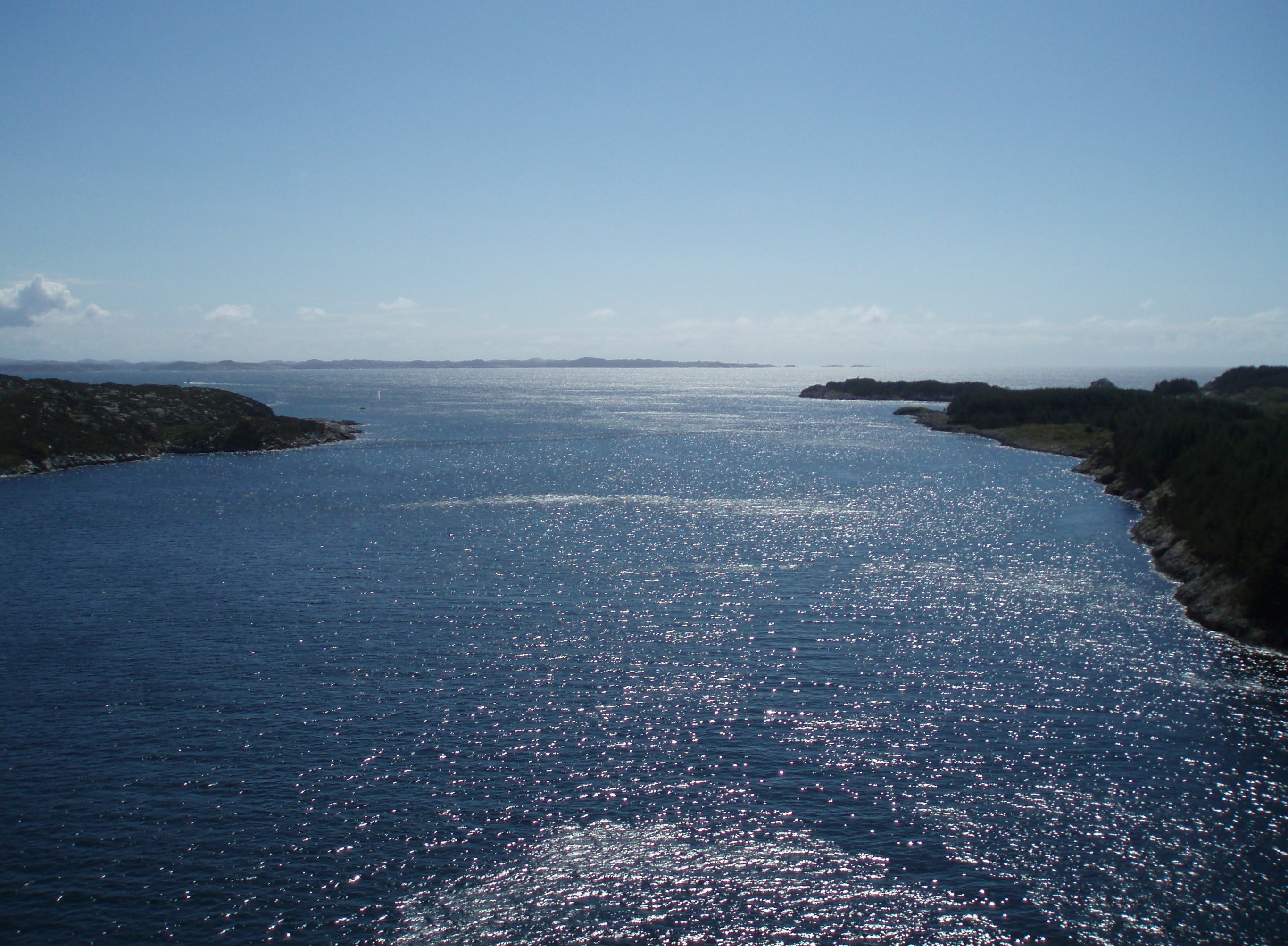
- View of the Stolmasundet
- Interactive map of Stolmen

Geography
- Location: Vestland, Norway
- Coordinates: 59.9911°N 5.0692°E
- Archipelago: Austevoll
- Area: 7.9 km^{2} (3.1 sq mi)
- Length: 4.2 km (2.61 mi)
- Width: 3.4 km (2.11 mi)
- Highest elevation: 60 m (200 ft)
- Highest point: Såta

Administration
- Norway
- County: Vestland
- Municipality: Austevoll Municipality

Demographics
- Population: 206
- Pop. density: 26/km^{2} (67/sq mi)

Stolmen is an island in Austevoll Municipality in Vestland county, Norway. The 7.9-square-kilometre (3.1 sq mi) island lies in a large archipelago just north of the Selbjørnsfjorden. The island of Selbjørn lies to the east, the islands of Huftarøy and Hundvåko lie to the northeast, and the islands of Storakalsøy, Litlakalsøy, and Møkster lie to the north.

The island had 186 inhabitants in 2017. The commercial centre of Stolmen is the village of Våge on the southern part of the island. Other villages on the island include Årland in the central part and Kvalvåg on the northern part. Møkster Church is located in the village of Kvalvåg. The Stolma Bridge connects the island of Stolmen to the neighboring island of Selbjørn.

The highest point is the 60-metre (200 ft) tall mountain Såta. The word "Såta" is the finite form of "såte" (meaning "haystack") since the shape of the mountain looks like the shape of a small cone-shaped haystack.

== See also ==
- List of islands of Norway
