= Vinnes =

Village in Austevoll Municipality, Norway

- Village
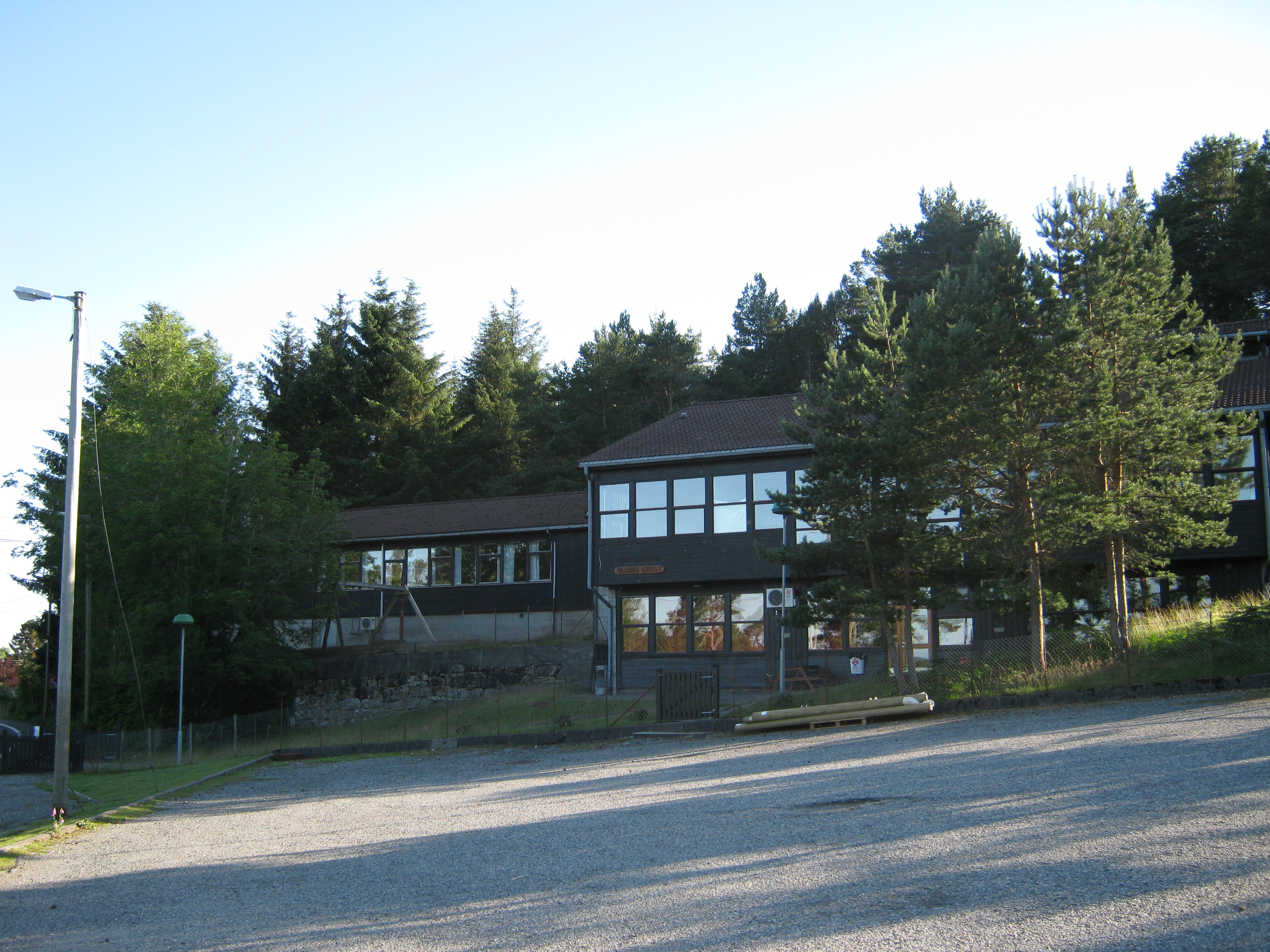
- View of the village school
- Interactive map of Vinnes
- Coordinates: 60.01018°N 5.26341°E
- Country: Norway
- Region: Western Norway
- County: Vestland
- District: Midhordland
- Municipality: Austevoll Municipality
- Elevation: 41 m (135 ft)
- Time zone: UTC+01:00 (CET)
  - Summer (DST): UTC+02:00 (CEST)
- Post Code: 5396 Vestre Vinnesvåg

Vinnes is a village in Austevoll Municipality in Vestland county, Norway. The village is located in the Vestre Vinnesvåg area along the southeastern shore of the island of Huftarøy, about 1 kilometre (0.62 mi) southwest of the village of Husavik and about 5 kilometres (3.1 mi) east of the village of Bekkjarvik. Vinnes School is located in the village, serving the southern part of the island.
