= Bekkjarvik Church =

Church in Vestland, Norway

- Bekkjarvik kirke
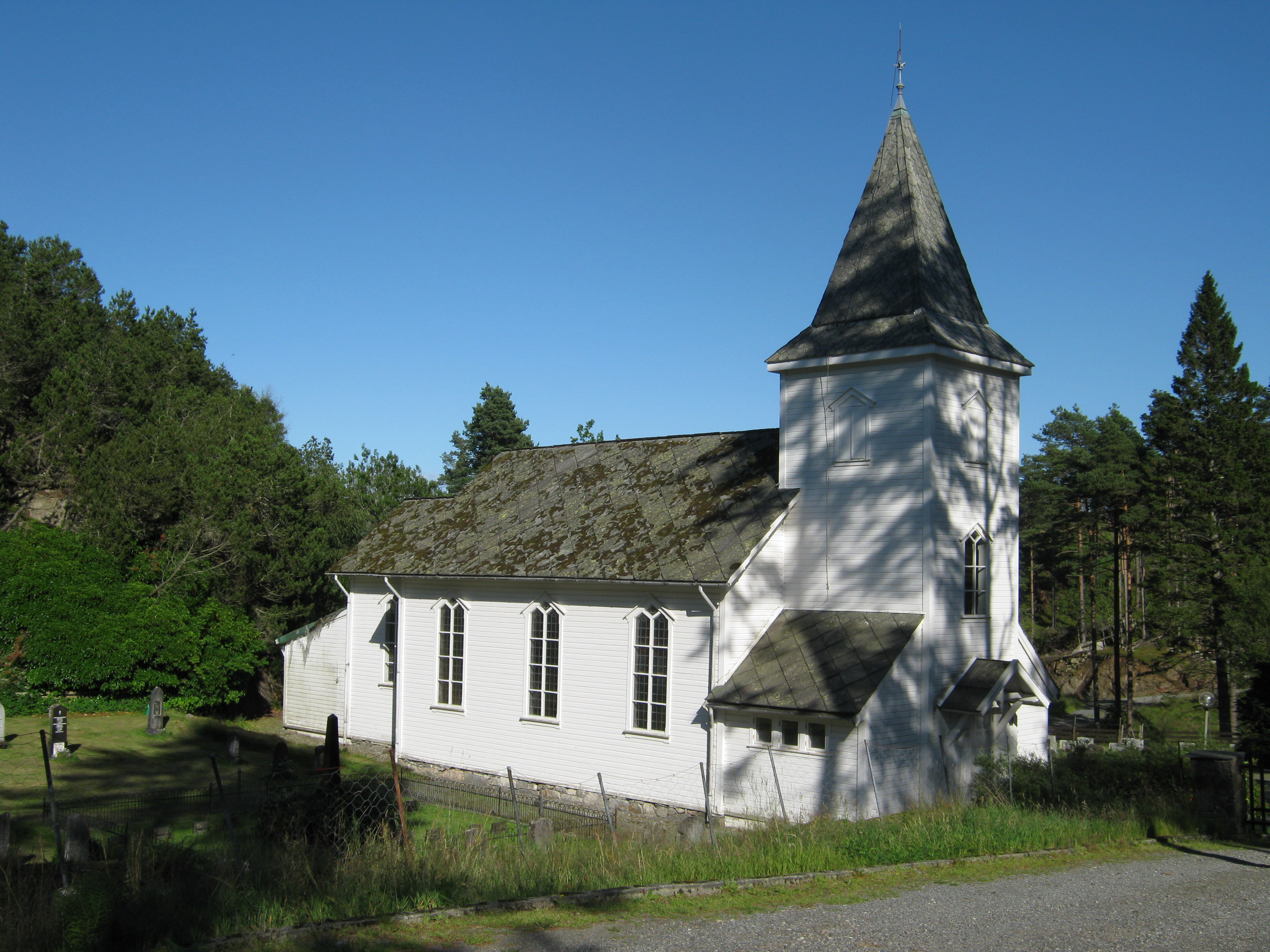
- View of the church
- Bekkjarvik Church
- 60°00′29″N 5°12′02″E
- Location: Austevoll Municipality, Vestland
- Country: Norway
- Denomination: Church of Norway
- Churchmanship: Evangelical Lutheran

History
- Status: Parish church
- Founded: 1898
- Consecrated: 1898

Architecture
- Functional status: Active
- Architect: J. Sandnæs
- Architectural type: Long church
- Completed: 1898 (128 years ago)

Specifications
- Capacity: 180
- Materials: Wood

Administration
- Diocese: Bjørgvin bispedømme
- Deanery: Fana prosti
- Parish: Austevoll
- Norwegian Cultural Heritage Site
- Type: Church
- Status: Not listed
- ID: 83864

Bekkjarvik Church (Norwegian: Bekkjarvik kirke) is a parish church of the Church of Norway in Austevoll Municipality in Vestland county, Norway. It is located in the village of Bekkjarvik on the eastern part of the island of Selbjørn. It is one of the five churches for the Austevoll parish which is part of the Fana prosti (deanery) in the Diocese of Bjørgvin. The white, wooden church was built in a long church design in 1898 using plans drawn up by the architect J. Sandnæs. The church seats about 180 people.

== History ==
A royal decree from 14 December 1895 approved the construction of a chapel at Bekkjarvik. The architect J. Sandnæs was hired to design the building. Construction on the new church was completed in 1898. The building was a long church with a rectangular nave and a somewhat narrower, straight-ended chancel. During the construction, a sacristy was built at the east end of the choir. In 1975, the church porch was enlarged using plans by the architect Ole Halvorsen. The additional space was used for a cloakroom and a waiting area. There was also a large addition on the southeast side of the choir which includes a kitchen and meeting room.

== See also ==
- List of churches in Bjørgvin
