= Selbjørn =

Island in Vestland, Norway

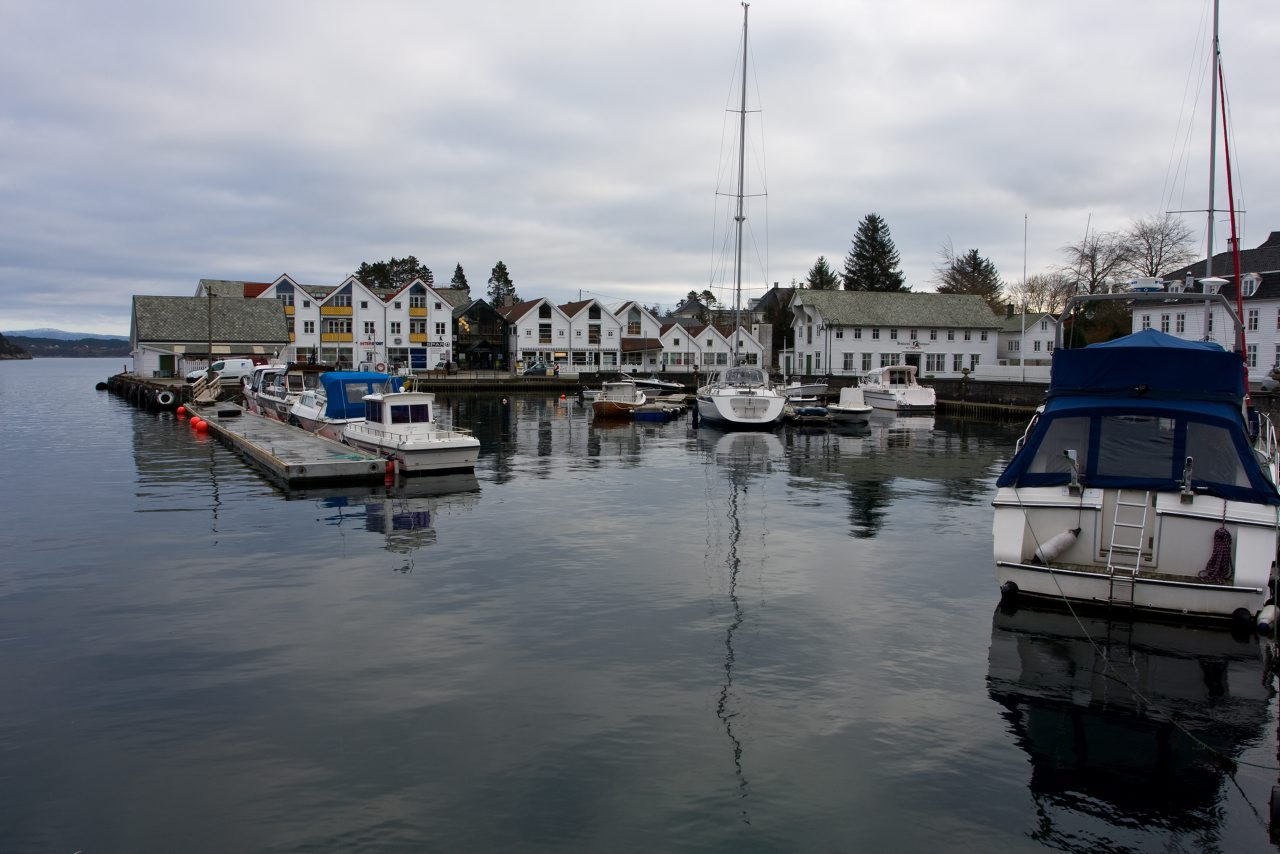
- View of Bekkjarvik
- Interactive map of Selbjørn

Geography
- Location: Vestland, Norway
- Coordinates: 59.9807°N 5.1621°E
- Archipelago: Austevoll
- Area: 25 km^{2} (9.7 sq mi)
- Length: 4.4 km (2.73 mi)
- Width: 6.5 km (4.04 mi)
- Highest elevation: 185 m (607 ft)
- Highest point: Kongsafjellet

Administration
- Norway
- County: Vestland
- Municipality: Austevoll Municipality

Demographics
- Population: 956
- Pop. density: 38/km^{2} (98/sq mi)

Selbjørn is an island in Austevoll Municipality in Vestland county, Norway. The 25-square-kilometre (9.7 sq mi) island is the second largest in the municipality (after Huftarøy). Most of the population lives along the northern and eastern coastlines of the island. The commercial centre of Selbjørn is the village of Bekkjarvik, where Bekkjarvik Church is located.

== Name ==
Selbjørn is based on the old Norwegian word Salbjǫrn meaning the bear in the saddle. The interpretation is that sailors and fishermen used Selbjørn as replacement for a more ancient "Hund" meaning quarry. However, "Hund" is the same as the Norwegian word for dog and "Hund" in the meaning of dog was according to old tradition something not to be mentioned at sea. The result being Salbjorn or Selbjørn as the new word for "Hund" (quarry).

The island's name was used in naming the fjord that lies immediately to the south, Selbjørnsfjorden.

== Geography ==
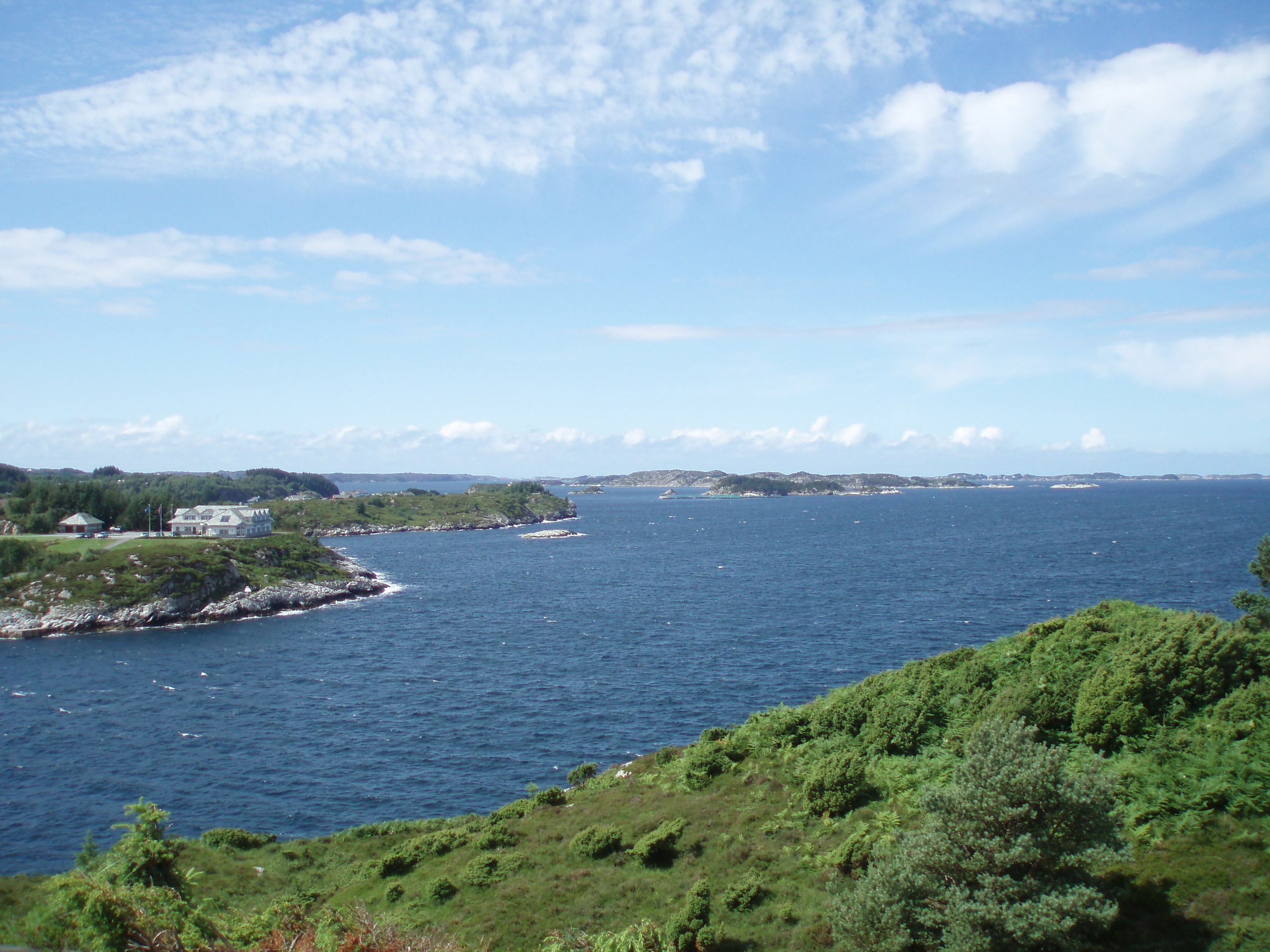
View of the Bekkjarviksundet strait

The island lies just north of the Selbjørnsfjorden on the southern part of the Austevoll archipelago. The neighboring island of Stolmen lies just to the west and the island of Huftarøy lies just to the northeast.

=== Kongsafjellet ===
The highest point on the island is the 185-metre (607 ft) tall mountain Kongsafjellet. Kongsafjellet has a strategic position to overview all the shipping lanes for boats coming from the North Sea and going north/south along the coast and in between the nearby islands. The estate of the historic Viking Kings in present-day Fitjar Municipality was also seen from the hilltop, and due to this and some archaeological findings, it is believed that King Haakon the Good used the hilltop as a scouting location as part of his Vikings security system.

== Transportation ==
Selbjørn is connected to the neighboring islands of Stolmen and Huftarøy by the Stolma Bridge on the west side of the island and the Selbjørn Bridge on the northeast side. The municipality of Austevoll is not connected to the rest of Norway by any roads, so one must take a ferry from the mainland of Bergen to the island of Huftarøy or take a ferry from the large island of Stord to the island of Huftarøy. The ferry from Bergen stops at Hufthammar on the north takes about 35 minutes to get to the island and the ferry from Stord stops at Husavik and takes about 25 minutes. Once on Huftarøy, one must drive to the Selbjørn Bridge to cross over to the island of Selbjørn.

== See also ==
- List of islands of Norway
