= Haukanes =

Village in Austevoll Municipality, Norway

- Village
- Interactive map of Haukanes
- Coordinates: 60.07546°N 5.26881°E
- Country: Norway
- Region: Western Norway
- County: Vestland
- District: Midhordland
- Municipality: Austevoll Municipality
- Elevation: 60 m (200 ft)
- Time zone: UTC+01:00 (CET)
  - Summer (DST): UTC+02:00 (CEST)
- Post Code: 5392 Storebø

Haukanes is a village in Austevoll Municipality in Vestland county, Norway. The village is located on the northeastern coast of the island of Huftarøy, about 4 kilometres (2.5 mi) southeast of the village of Storebø.
