= Julius Christopher Hammer =

Norwegian priest and politician

Julius Christopher Hammer (14 May 1798 – 31 December 1877) was a Norwegian priest and politician.

He was born in Bergen. In April 1831 he married Caroline Agnete Neumann.

He was elected to the Norwegian Parliament in 1842, representing the constituency of Søndre Bergenhus Amt. He only served one term. At that time he worked as a vicar at Haus Church in Haus Municipality.
