= Årland =

Village in Austevoll Municipality, Norway

- Village
- Interactive map of Årland
- Coordinates: 59.98956°N 5.08154°E
- Country: Norway
- Region: Western Norway
- County: Vestland
- District: Midhordland
- Municipality: Austevoll Municipality
- Elevation: 25 m (82 ft)
- Time zone: UTC+01:00 (CET)
  - Summer (DST): UTC+02:00 (CEST)
- Post Code: 5398 Stolmen

Årland is a village in Austevoll Municipality in Vestland county, Norway. The village is located on the southern part of the island of Stolmen, just north of the village of Våge.
