= Strilelandet =

District in Vestland county, Norway

Coordinates: 60°31′03″N 5°13′45″E

Strilelandet is a loosely defined district in Vestland county, Norway. It is normally defined as Nordhordland and Midhordland except for Bergen. It has traditionally been used as a term within Bergen to describe people who came from the surrounding area, and could be approximately defined as the area which was within a day's rowing of Bergen.
