= Austevoll Church =

Church in Vestland, Norway

- Austevoll kirke
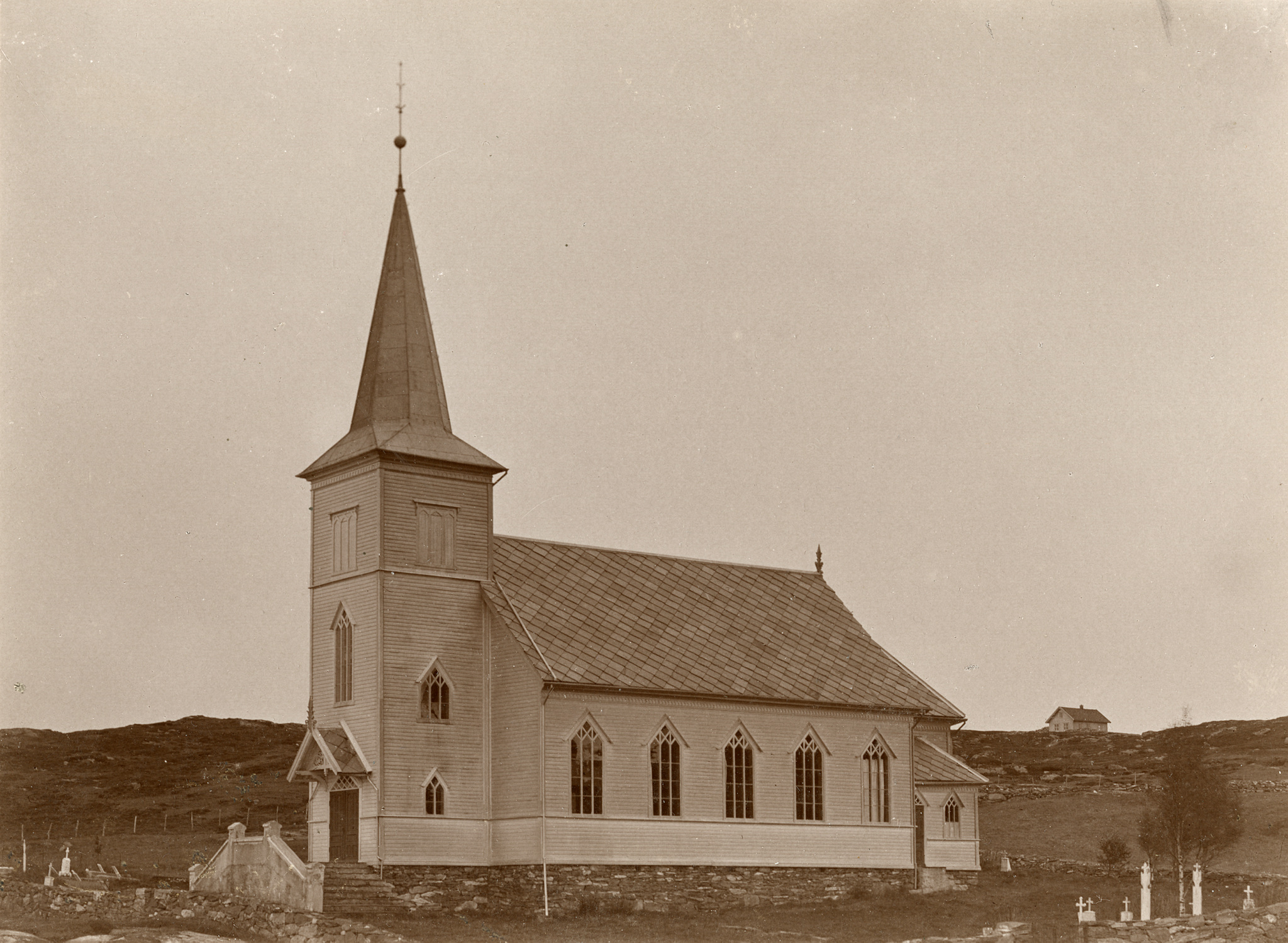
- View of the church
- Austevoll Church
- 60°05′37″N 5°13′21″E
- Location: Austevoll Municipality, Vestland
- Country: Norway
- Denomination: Church of Norway
- Previous denomination: Catholic Church
- Churchmanship: Evangelical Lutheran

History
- Status: Parish church
- Founded: 13th century
- Consecrated: 22 Jan 1891

Architecture
- Functional status: Active
- Architect: Hans Heinrich Jess
- Architectural type: Long church
- Completed: 1890 (136 years ago)

Specifications
- Capacity: 400
- Materials: Wood

Administration
- Diocese: Bjørgvin bispedømme
- Deanery: Fana prosti
- Parish: Austevoll
- Norwegian Cultural Heritage Site
- Type: Church
- Status: Not listed
- ID: 222488

Austevoll Church (Norwegian: Austevoll kirke) is a parish church of the Church of Norway in Austevoll Municipality in Vestland county, Norway. It is located in the village of Storebø. It is one of the five churches for the Austevoll parish which is part of the Fana prosti (deanery) in the Diocese of Bjørgvin. The white, wooden church was built in a long church design in 1890 using plans drawn up by the architect Hans Heinrich Jess (1847-1916). The church seats about 400 people.

== History ==
The earliest existing historical records of the church date back to the year 1306, the church was not new that year. The first church in Austevoll was a wooden stave church built on the small island of Sandtorv, probably during the late 1200s. According to the Hákonar saga Hákonarsonar, King Håkon is said to have rowed out to the island of Sandtorv and held a mass there in 1240. It is possible the church was built shortly after that time. Archaeological findings show that the nave of the church was probably about 10 by 6 metres (33 ft × 20 ft).

In the 1650s, the Sandtorv church was old and so it was decided to tear down the church and move the church site to Austevollshella on the nearby island of Hundvåko. In 1653–1655, the old church was torn down and the new church was constructed on the new site. There is some evidence that some of the materials from the old stave church were reused in the construction of the new church. According to a local legend, the new church was originally going to be built on the old site, but a storm carried the material over to the site on Austevollshella. Taken as a sign from God, the new church was built there. This was a timber-framed long church building with a rectangular nave that measured about 12.7 by 8.9 metres (42 ft × 29 ft) and a narrower, rectangular chancel that measured about 7.6 by 6.3 metres (25 ft × 21 ft). The church at Austevollshella was in use for over 200 years, giving name to the parish of Austevoll, which in turn gave name to the municipality in 1886.

The church building was owned by the King until 1724 when it was sold to Bent Uldrich for 70 rigsdaler. The church was purchased by the people of the parish around the year 1860. In 1891, the church was torn down and the present church was rebuilt on the nearby island of Huftarøy in the village of Storebø. Hans Heinrich Jess was hired to design the new, larger church. Construction work began around midsummer 1890 and was completed by Christmas the same year. The builder was B. Skaare. This new church was consecrated on 22 January 1891 by the Bishop Waldemar Hvoslef. In 1987, the baptismal waiting room and the sacristy on each side of the choir were expanded.

The present Hundvåkøy Church now sits on the site at Austevollshella where the old Austevoll Church was located from the 1650s until 1891. Some items from the medieval Sandtorv church, including the shrine, are still in existence to this day and they are currently in custody of the Bergen Museum.

== See also ==
- List of churches in Bjørgvin
