= Rostøya =

Island in Vestland, Norway

Rostøya Rostøy (unofficial)
- Interactive map of the island

Geography
- Location: Vestland, Norway
- Coordinates: 60.0849°N 5.2057°E
- Archipelago: Austevoll
- Area: 0.68 km^{2} (0.26 sq mi)
- Length: 2 km (1.2 mi)
- Width: 500 m (1600 ft)
- Coastline: 4.7 km (2.92 mi)
- Highest elevation: 56 m (184 ft)

Administration
- Norway
- County: Vestland
- Municipality: Austevoll Municipality

Rostøybrua in Austevoll.

Rostøya is an island in Austevoll Municipality in Vestland county, Norway. It is located north of the island of Drøna and west of the island of Huftarøy. The village of Kolbeinsvik lies about 4 kilometres (2.5 mi) south of Rostøya. The island is connected to the island of Huftarøy by a road bridge that crosses the 12-metre (39 ft) wide channel separating the islands.

== See also ==
- List of islands of Norway
