= Birkeland, Vestland =

Village in Austevoll Municipality, Norway

Birkeland
- Village
- Interactive map of Birkeland
- Coordinates: 60.10605°N 5.22779°E
- Country: Norway
- Region: Western Norway
- County: Vestland
- District: Midhordland
- Municipality: Austevoll Municipality
- Elevation: 62 m (203 ft)
- Time zone: UTC+01:00 (CET)
  - Summer (DST): UTC+02:00 (CEST)
- Post Code: 5392 Storebø

Birkeland is a village in Austevoll Municipality in Vestland county, Norway. The village is located on the island of Huftarøy, just to the north of the village of Storebø, the municipal centre. Birkeland is included in the urban area of Storebø which had a population (2025) of 1,695.

== Name ==
The village is named after the old Birkeland farm (Old Norse: Birkiland). The first element is birki which means 'birch forest' and the last element is land which means 'land' or 'farm'.
