= Bekkjarvik =

Village in Austevoll Municipality, Norway

- Village
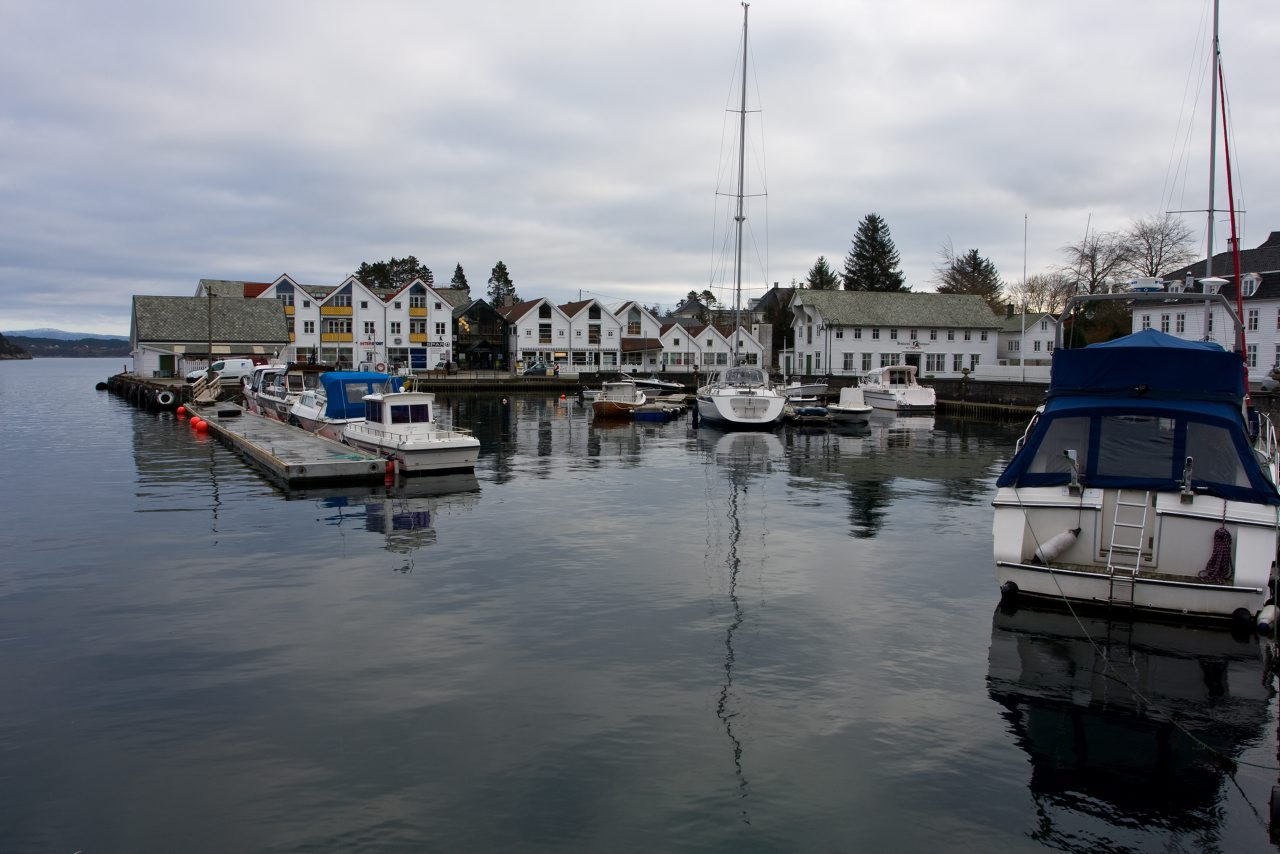
- View of the village
- Interactive map of Bekkjarvik
- Coordinates: 60.00834°N 5.20135°E
- Country: Norway
- Region: Western Norway
- County: Vestland
- District: Midhordland
- Municipality: Austevoll Municipality

Area
  - Total: 0.9 km^{2} (0.35 sq mi)
- Elevation: 3 m (9.8 ft)

Population (2025)
  - Total: 594
  - Density: 660/km^{2} (1,700/sq mi)
- Time zone: UTC+01:00 (CET)
  - Summer (DST): UTC+02:00 (CEST)
- Post Code: 5397 Bekkjarvik

Bekkjarvik is a village in Austevoll Municipality in Vestland county, Norway. The village is located on the northeastern coast of the island of Selbjørn.

The 0.9-square-kilometre (220-acre) village has a population (2025) of 594 and a population density of 660 inhabitants per square kilometre (1,700/sq mi).

The village is an old trading post, with an inn that has been in operation since the 17th century. There was also a barrel factory. Today, the inn is still in operation and most of the economy centers around the seasonal fishing industry. Bekkjarvik Church has been located in this village since 1895. The Selbjørn Bridge runs from Bekkjarvik across a small strait to the nearby island of Huftarøy.

== Notable people ==
- Ørjan Johannessen, the winner of Bocuse d’Or
