= Austevoll Municipality =

Municipality in Vestland, Norway

Austevoll Municipality Austevoll kommune
- Municipality
- Austevold herred (historic name); Østervold herred (historic name)
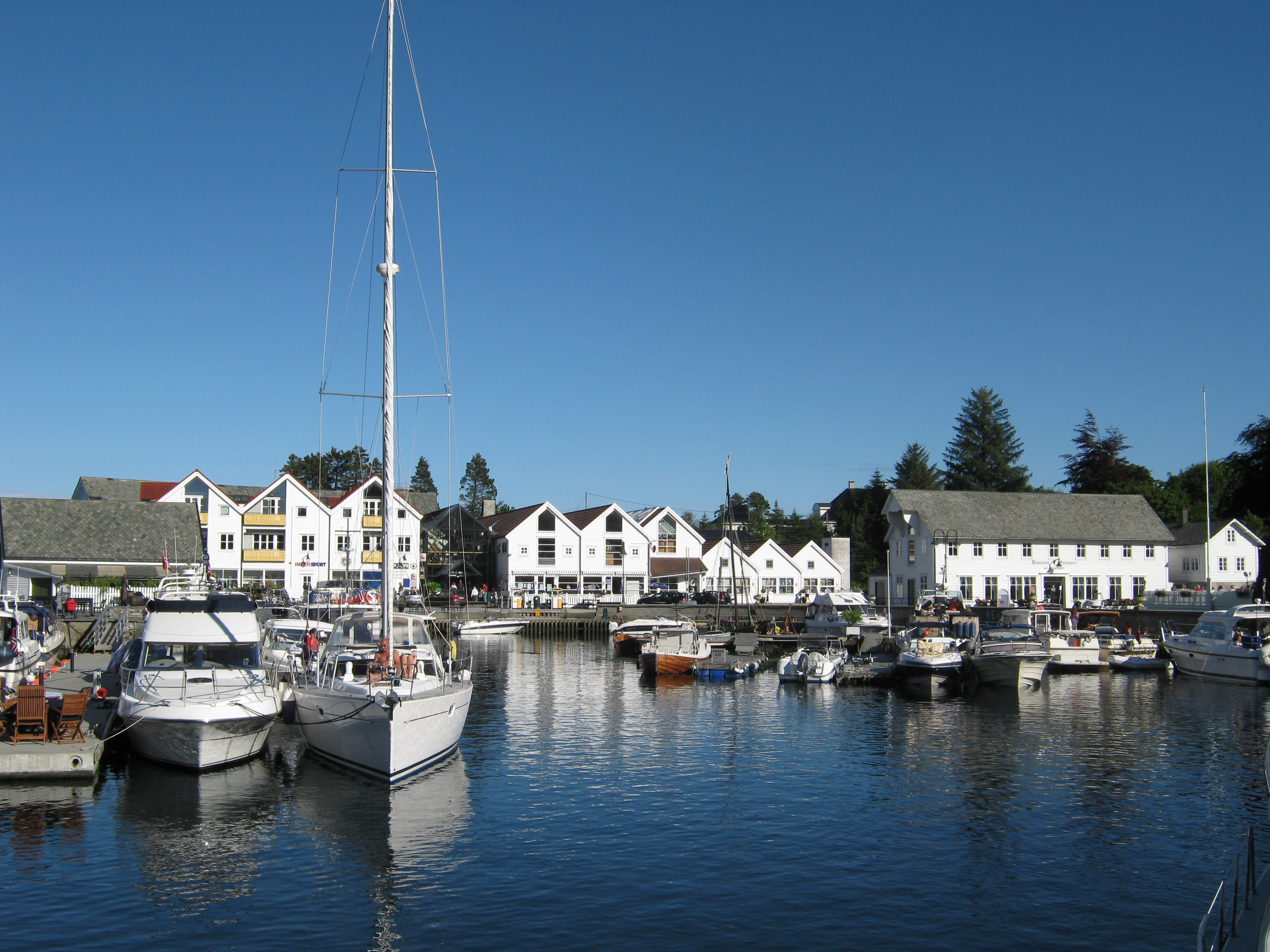
- Bekkjarvik harbour

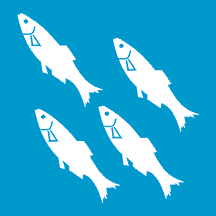
- Flag Coat of arms

- Vestland within Norway

- Austevoll within Vestland
- Coordinates: 60°02′16″N 05°16′06″E
- Country: Norway
- County: Vestland
- District: Midhordland
- Established: 1 Jan 1886
  - Preceded by: Sund Municipality
- Administrative centre: Storebø

Government
  - Mayor (2023): Bente Kari Sletten Taranger (H)

Area
  - Total: 117.23 km^{2} (45.26 sq mi)
  - Land: 114.28 km^{2} (44.12 sq mi)
  - Water: 2.95 km^{2} (1.14 sq mi) 2.5%
  - Rank: #324 in Norway
- Highest elevation: 243.42 m (798.6 ft)

Population (2025)
  - Total: 5,437
  - Rank: #176 in Norway
  - Density: 46.4/km^{2} (120/sq mi)
  - Change (10 years): ▲ +7.6%
- Demonym: Austevolling

Official language
  - Norwegian form: Nynorsk
- Time zone: UTC+01:00 (CET)
  - Summer (DST): UTC+02:00 (CEST)
- ISO 3166 code: NO-4625
- Website: Official website

Austevoll is a municipality and an archipelago in Vestland county, Norway. It is located in the traditional district of Midhordland in Western Norway. The administrative centre is the village of Storebø on the island of Huftarøy. Other villages in the municipality include Årland, Austevollshella, Bakkasund, Bekkjarvik, Birkeland, Haukanes, Husavik, Kolbeinsvik, Otterå, Våge, and Vinnes.

The municipality consists of hundreds of islands located southwest of the city of Bergen. The municipality is considered to be among the ports in the world with the largest ocean-going fishing trawler fleet. Since the 1980s, the offshore oil industry and fish farming industry have both grown to be important industries in Austevoll.

The 117.23-square-kilometre (45.26 sq mi) municipality is the 324th largest by area out of the 357 municipalities in Norway. Austevoll Municipality is the 176th most populous municipality in Norway with a population of 5,437. The municipality's population density is 46.4 inhabitants per square kilometre (120/sq mi) and its population has increased by 7.6% over the previous 10-year period.

== General information ==
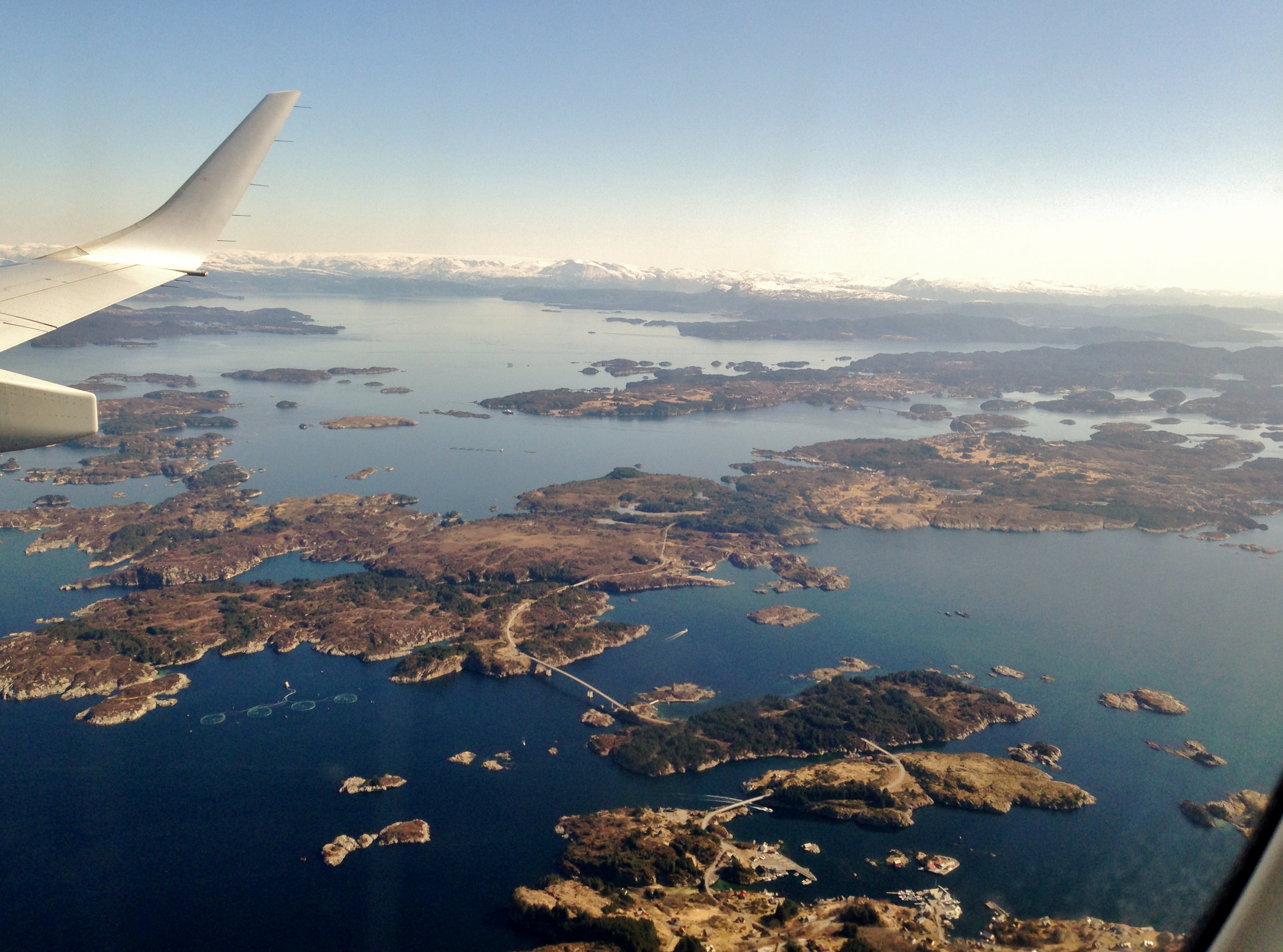
Aerial view of northern Austevoll

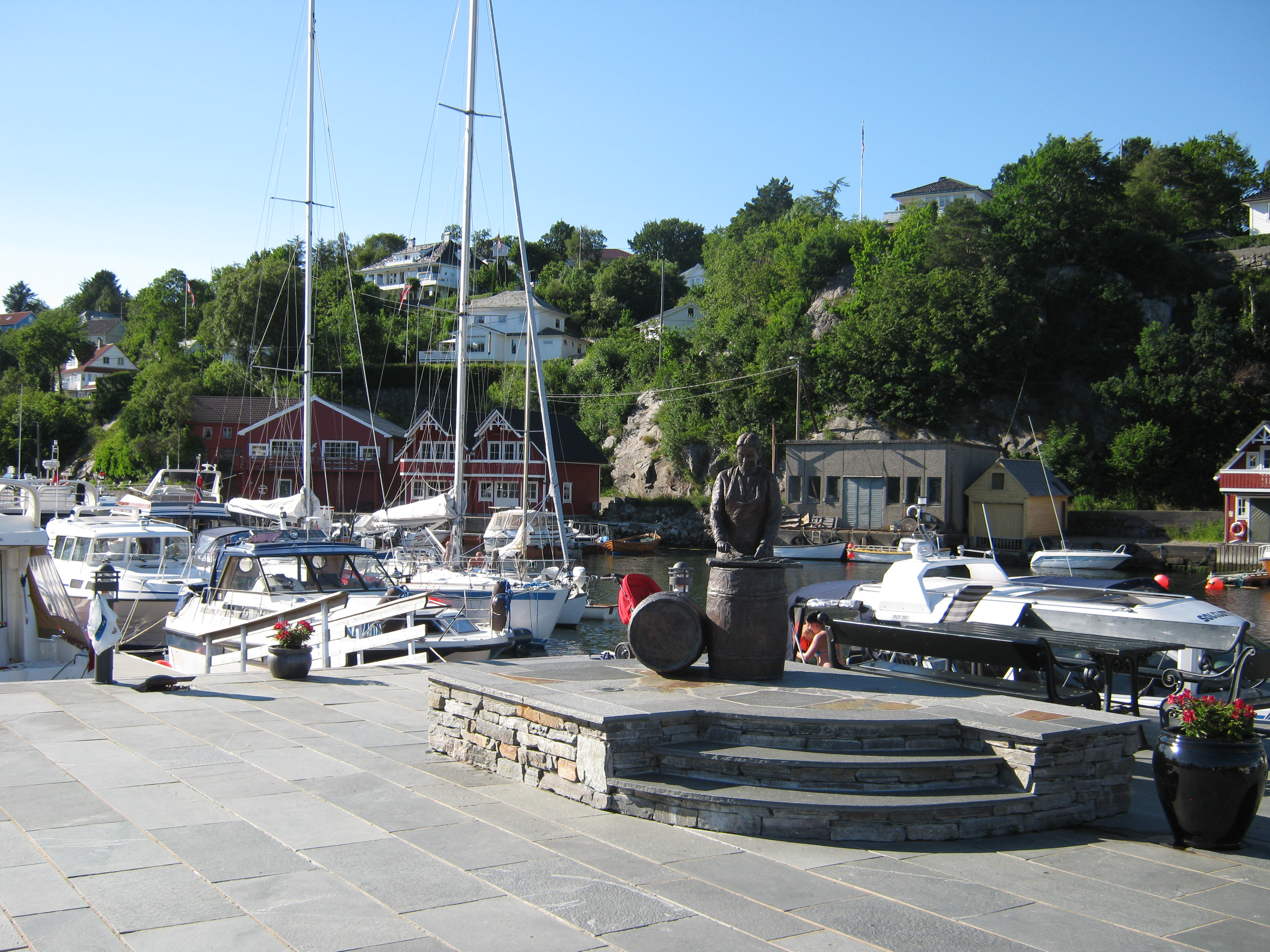
Sildajento

The municipality of Austevoll was established on 1 January 1886 when the large Sund Municipality was divided. The southern part of the municipality (population: 2,396) became the new Østervold Municipality (later spelled Austevoll) and the northern part of the municipality (population: 2,112) remained as a smaller Sund Municipality.

During the 1960s, there were many municipal mergers across Norway due to the work of the Schei Committee. On 1 January 1964, the southern part of the islands of Selbjørn and Huftarøy (population: 696) was transferred from Fitjar Municipality to Austevoll Municipality. This meant that the whole Austevoll archipelago belonged to Austevoll Municipality.

Historically, this municipality was part of the old Hordaland county. On 1 January 2020, the municipality became a part of the newly-formed Vestland county (after Hordaland and Sogn og Fjordane counties were merged).

=== Name ===
The municipality (originally the parish) is named after the old Austevoll farm (Old Norse: Austrvǫllr) since the first Austevoll Church was built there. The farm is now part of the village of Austevollshella. The first element is austr which means "east". The last element is vǫllr which means "meadow" or "field". The municipality has changed the spelling of its name three times. Historically, the name of the municipality was spelled Østervold or Østevold. In 1889, the spelling was changed to Austevold. On 3 November 1917, a royal resolution changed the spelling of the name of the municipality to Austevoll.

=== Coat of arms ===
The coat of arms was granted on 30 November 1984. The official blazon is "Azure, four herrings argent in bend 1-2-1" (Norwegian: På blå bunn fire kvite silder på skrå oppover, 1-2-1). This means the arms have a blue field (background) and the charge is a set of four herring swimming diagonally up to the left. The charg has a tincture of argent which means it is commonly colored white, but if it is made out of metal, then silver is used. The shoal of herring was chosen for the arms since herring fishing is a very important part of the local economy. The arms were designed by John Digernes. The municipal flag has the same design as the coat of arms.

=== Churches ===
The Church of Norway has one parish (sokn) within Austevoll Municipality. It is part of the Fana prosti (deanery) in the Diocese of Bjørgvin.

Churches in Austevoll Municipality
Parish (sokn)	Church name	Location of the church	Year built
Austevoll	Austevoll Church	Storebø	1890
Austevoll	Bekkjarvik Church	Bekkjarvik	1895
Austevoll	Hundvåkøy Church	Austevollshella	1990
Austevoll	Møkster Church	Stolmen	1892
Austevoll	Store-Kalsøy Chapel	Bakkasund	1975

== Geography ==
Austevoll Municipality consists of 667 islands off the west coast of Western Norway. The municipality has a total land area of 114.23 square kilometres (44.10 sq mi) and a coastline of 337 kilometres (209 mi). It lies south of the Korsfjorden, west of the Bjørnafjorden, and north of the Selbjørnsfjorden. The highest point in Austevoll is the mountain Loddo, reaching 243.42 metres (798.6 ft) above sea level. The Marstein Lighthouse lies in the northwestern part of the municipality.

=== Islands ===
The largest islands (in order) are Huftarøy, Selbjørn, Hundvåko, Stolmen, Storekalsøy, and Møkster. Other islands in the municipality include Litlakalsøy, Lunnøya, Drøna, Rostøya, Fugløya, Horgo, Sandtorr, and Trollsøya among many others.

=== Neighbours ===
The island municipality shares water borders with Øygarden Municipality to the north, Bergen Municipality and Bjørnafjorden Municipality to the northeast, Tysnes Municipality to the east, and Fitjar Municipality and Bømlo Municipality to the south. The North Sea lies to the west of Austevoll Municipality.

== Demographics ==
Historical population
Year	Pop.	±% p.a.
1886	2,396	—
1891	2,332	−0.54%
1900	2,536	+0.94%
1910	2,554	+0.07%
1920	2,760	+0.78%
1930	2,928	+0.59%
1946	3,272	+0.70%
1951	3,231	−0.25%
1960	3,413	+0.61%
1970	3,957	+1.49%
1980	3,893	−0.16%
1990	4,200	+0.76%
2000	4,406	+0.48%
2010	4,571	+0.37%
2020	5,236	+1.37%
2023	5,297	+0.39%
Note: The municipal borders were changed in 1964, causing a significant change in the population. Source: Statistics Norway and Norwegian Historical Data Centre

Of the 667 islands, only eight are populated year-round. About 29% of the inhabitants live in densely populated areas. About 28% of the inhabitants are under the age of 17, which is 4.4% over the national average. About 4.7% of the inhabitants are 80 years or older.

=== Villages ===
Rank	Village	Village Population (2005)	District Population (2001)
1	Storebø	1,032	1,341
2	Bekkjarvik	355	489
3	Kolbeinsvik		481
4	Vinnes		378
5	Haukanes		235

=== Inhabited islands ===
Rank	Island	Area (km^{2})	Population	Density (/km^{2})	Largest settlement	Highest point	Elevation (m)
1	Huftarøy	50.4	2,435	48.3	Storebø	Loddo	244
2	Selbjørn	25	956	38.24	Bekkjarvik	Kongsafjellet	185
3	Hundvåkøy	10.7	554	51.7	Austevollshella		61
4	Stolmen	7.9	206	26.0	Våge	Såta	60
5	Storekalsøy	6	167	27.0	Bakkasund	Mjuken	57
6	Møkster		65				
7	Litlekalsøy		26				

== Gallery ==
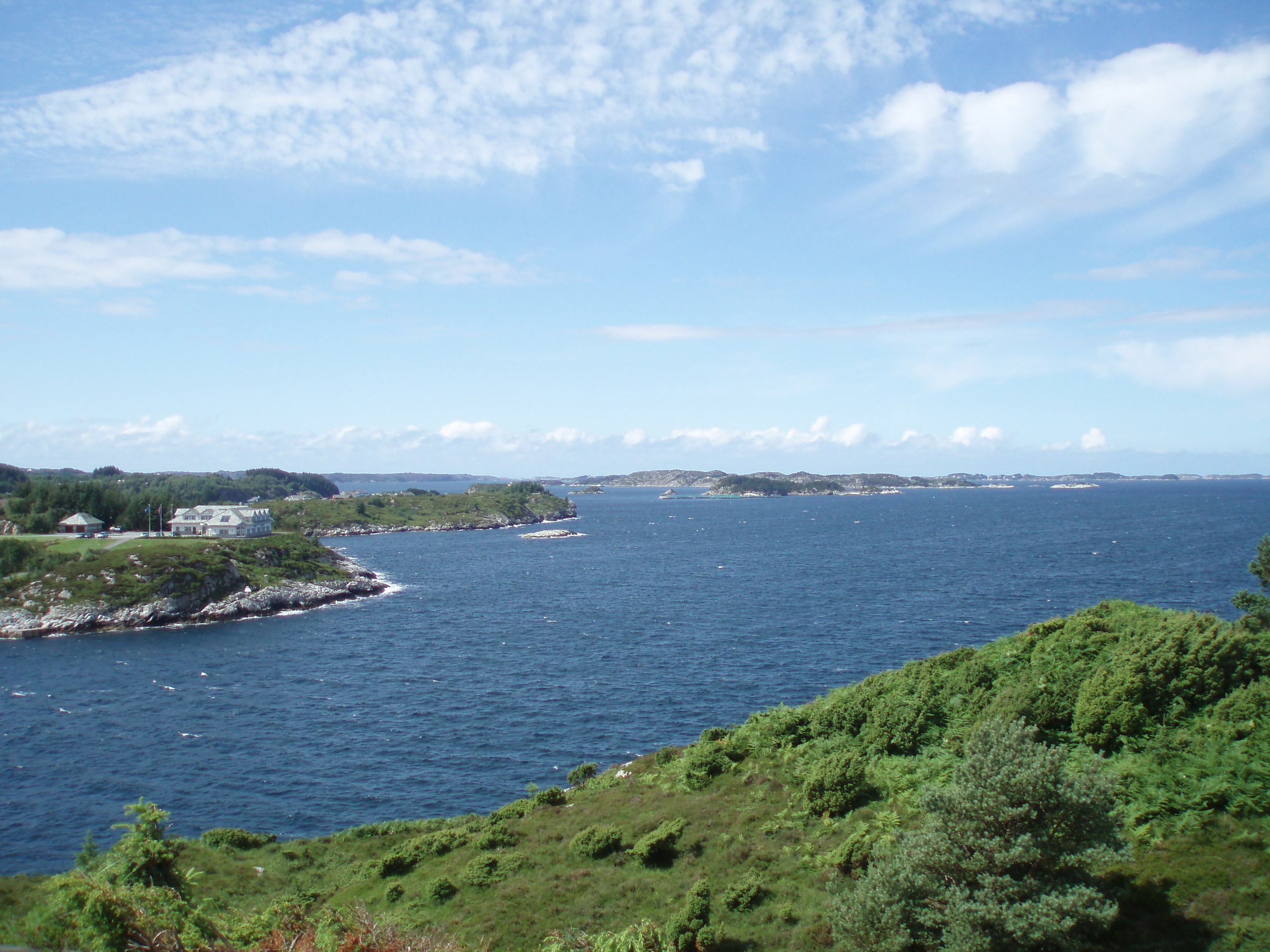
Bekkjarviksundet, between Selbjørn and Huftarøy.

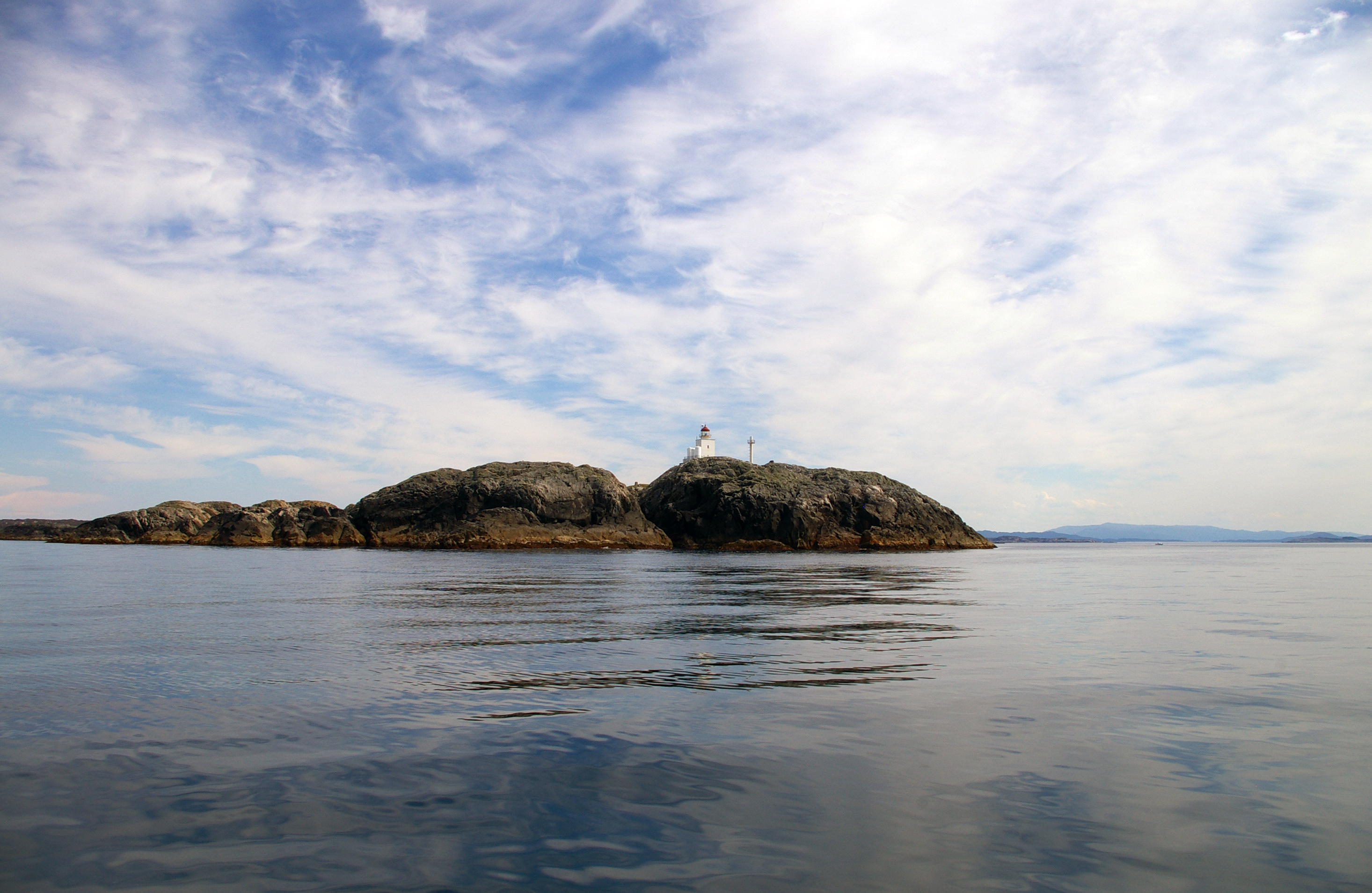
Marstein Lighthouse

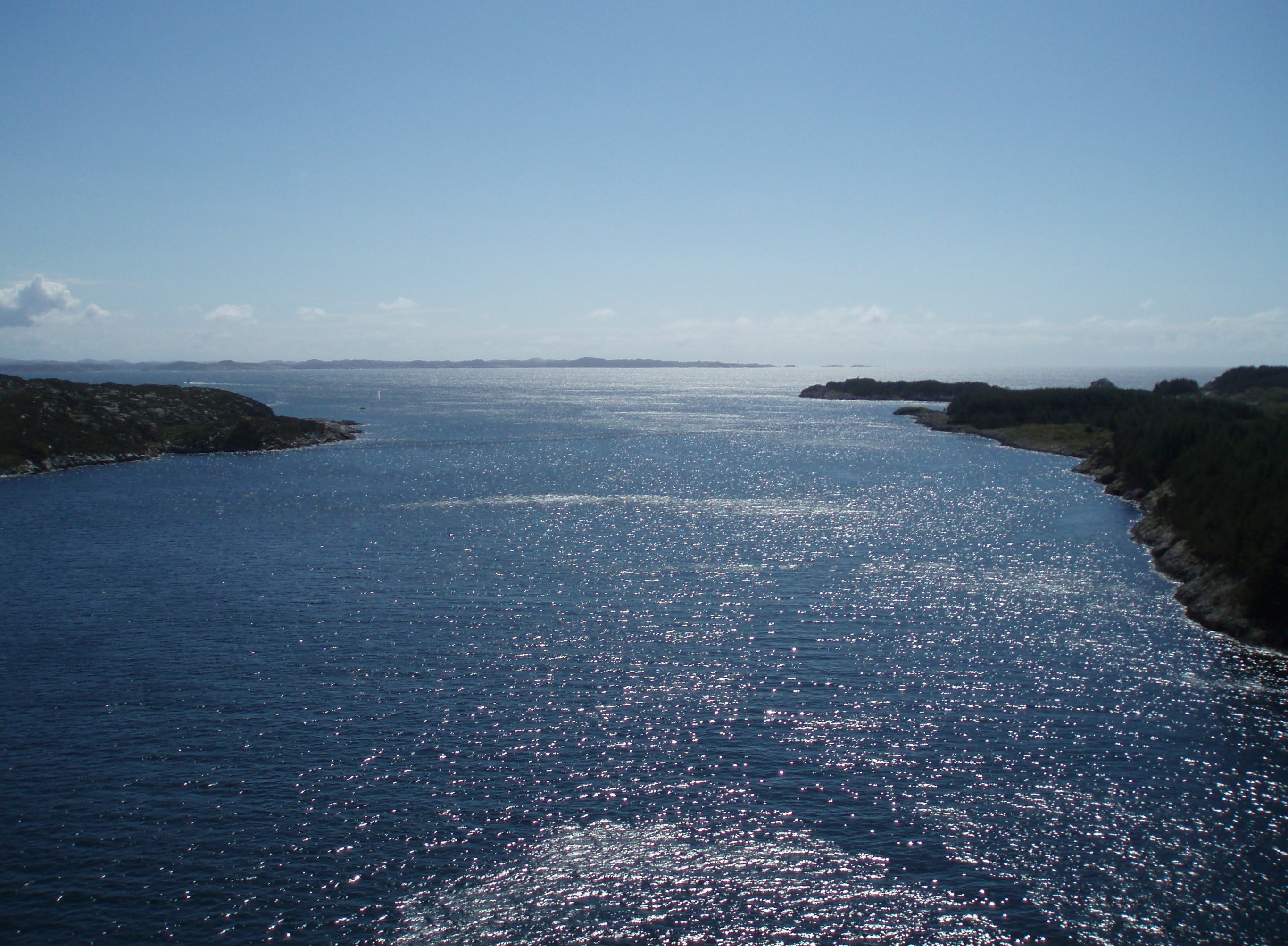
Stolmasundet, between Stolmen and Selbjørn.

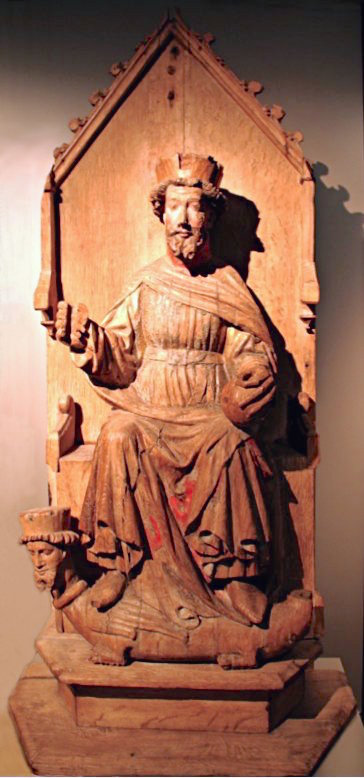
Olaf II of Norway from Austevoll Church

== Industry ==
Fishing is the most important industry in Austevoll, as it has been for centuries. Traditionally, fishing has taken place in coastal areas, not far off shore. After decades of overfishing, the herring disappeared in the 1950s. This forced a restructuring of the fishing fleet. Since the 1960s, the shipping companies built bigger ships, and went further out into the seas, and they began fishing for other fish species, not just herring. The overfishing of herring also forced better research on fishing, resulting in the Norwegian Institute of Marine Research. Austevoll is the home of the Austevoll Aquaculture Research Station.

Since the early 1980s, the offshore supply industry has emerged in the wake of the offshore Norwegian oil industry. The offshore shipping company DOF, which is listed on the Oslo Stock Exchange, has its headquarters at Storebø.

== Education ==
There are five primary schools and one middle school in Austevoll, all run by the municipality. There is also one secondary school, teaching mainly fishing and nautical subjects. This is operated by the Vestland County Municipality.

== Transportation ==
Austevoll has car ferry connections from Hufthammar on the north tip of Huftarøy to Krokeide in Bergen, and from Husavik on the south tip of Huftarøy island to Sandvikvåg in Fitjar Municipality. The municipality is also connected by express boats to Bergen in the north, and Stord, Haugesund, and Stavanger in the south. All express boat routes are operated by Norled, and ferry routes are operated by Fosen Namsos.

The islands of Huftarøy and Selbjørn, Selbjørn and Stolmen, and Hundvåkøy and Storekalsøy are connected with bridges. A fourth bridge, connecting Huftarøy and Hundvåkøy, was opened on 17 November 2007. This bridge, which in fact consists of two bridges and two stone fillings, bears the name "Austevollsbrua".

== Government ==
Austevoll Municipality is responsible for primary education (through 10th grade), outpatient health services, senior citizen services, welfare and other social services, zoning, economic development, and municipal roads and utilities. The municipality is governed by a municipal council of directly elected representatives. The mayor is indirectly elected by a vote of the municipal council. The municipality is under the jurisdiction of the Hordaland District Court and the Gulating Court of Appeal.

=== Municipal council ===
The municipal council (Kommunestyre) of Austevoll Municipality is made up of 21 representatives that are elected to four-year terms.

From 1995 to 1999 the Socialist Left Party held one seat. In the 1999–2003 election period an all-party female electoral list held one seat in the council. In the 2003-2007 election period The Liberal Party was represented in the municipal council and held one seat. From 2011 to 2015, a coalition of the Progress Party and Center Party held power in the council. The coalition also consisted of the Christian Democratic Party before 2011. In 2011, the coalition won 12 of the 21 seats in the municipal council and had an electoral and political cooperation. The Conservative Party, Labour Party, and Christian Democratic Party make up the opposition.

The tables below show the current and historical composition of the council by political party.

Austevoll kommunestyre 2023–2027
Party name (in Nynorsk)	Number of representatives
Labour Party (Arbeidarpartiet)	2
Progress Party (Framstegspartiet)	8
Green Party (Miljøpartiet Dei Grøne)	1
Conservative Party (Høgre)	7
Industry and Business Party (Industri‑ og Næringspartiet)	2
Christian Democratic Party (Kristeleg Folkeparti)	1
Total number of members:	21

Austevoll kommunestyre 2019–2023
Party name (in Nynorsk)	Number of representatives
Labour Party (Arbeidarpartiet)	4
Progress Party (Framstegspartiet)	5
Green Party (Miljøpartiet Dei Grøne)	1
Conservative Party (Høgre)	8
Christian Democratic Party (Kristeleg Folkeparti)	1
Centre Party (Senterpartiet)	2
Total number of members:	21

Austevoll kommunestyre 2015–2019
Party name (in Nynorsk)	Number of representatives
Labour Party (Arbeidarpartiet)	5
Progress Party (Framstegspartiet)	5
Conservative Party (Høgre)	8
Christian Democratic Party (Kristeleg Folkeparti)	2
Centre Party (Senterpartiet)	1
Total number of members:	21

Austevoll kommunestyre 2011–2015
Party name (in Nynorsk)	Number of representatives
Labour Party (Arbeidarpartiet)	2
Progress Party (Framstegspartiet)	10
Conservative Party (Høgre)	6
Christian Democratic Party (Kristeleg Folkeparti)	1
Centre Party (Senterpartiet)	2
Total number of members:	21

Austevoll kommunestyre 2007–2011
Party name (in Nynorsk)	Number of representatives
Labour Party (Arbeidarpartiet)	3
Progress Party (Framstegspartiet)	9
Conservative Party (Høgre)	5
Christian Democratic Party (Kristeleg Folkeparti)	2
Centre Party (Senterpartiet)	2
Total number of members:	21

Austevoll kommunestyre 2003–2007
Party name (in Nynorsk)	Number of representatives
Labour Party (Arbeidarpartiet)	4
Progress Party (Framstegspartiet)	9
Conservative Party (Høgre)	7
Christian Democratic Party (Kristeleg Folkeparti)	3
Centre Party (Senterpartiet)	3
Liberal Party (Venstre)	1
Total number of members:	27

Austevoll kommunestyre 1999–2003
Party name (in Nynorsk)	Number of representatives
Labour Party (Arbeidarpartiet)	4
Progress Party (Framstegspartiet)	4
Conservative Party (Høgre)	10
Christian Democratic Party (Kristeleg Folkeparti)	5
Centre Party (Senterpartiet)	3
Austevoll List (Austevolllista)	1
Total number of members:	27

Austevoll kommunestyre 1995–1999
Party name (in Nynorsk)	Number of representatives
Labour Party (Arbeidarpartiet)	5
Conservative Party (Høgre)	9
Christian Democratic Party (Kristeleg Folkeparti)	7
Centre Party (Senterpartiet)	5
Socialist Left Party (Sosialistisk Venstreparti)	1
Total number of members:	27

Austevoll kommunestyre 1991–1995
Party name (in Nynorsk)	Number of representatives
Labour Party (Arbeidarpartiet)	3
Progress Party (Framstegspartiet)	1
Conservative Party (Høgre)	11
Christian Democratic Party (Kristeleg Folkeparti)	6
Centre Party (Senterpartiet)	4
Socialist Left Party (Sosialistisk Venstreparti)	2
Total number of members:	27

Austevoll kommunestyre 1987–1991
Party name (in Nynorsk)	Number of representatives
Labour Party (Arbeidarpartiet)	7
Conservative Party (Høgre)	10
Christian Democratic Party (Kristeleg Folkeparti)	7
Centre Party (Senterpartiet)	3
Total number of members:	27

Austevoll kommunestyre 1983–1987
Party name (in Nynorsk)	Number of representatives
Labour Party (Arbeidarpartiet)	5
Conservative Party (Høgre)	9
Christian Democratic Party (Kristeleg Folkeparti)	8
Centre Party (Senterpartiet)	4
Liberal Party (Venstre)	1
Total number of members:	27

Austevoll kommunestyre 1979–1983
Party name (in Nynorsk)	Number of representatives
Labour Party (Arbeidarpartiet)	4
Conservative Party (Høgre)	9
Christian Democratic Party (Kristeleg Folkeparti)	7
New People's Party (Nye Folkepartiet)	1
Centre Party (Senterpartiet)	6
Total number of members:	27

Austevoll kommunestyre 1975–1979
Party name (in Nynorsk)	Number of representatives
Labour Party (Arbeidarpartiet)	4
Conservative Party (Høgre)	3
Christian Democratic Party (Kristeleg Folkeparti)	8
New People's Party (Nye Folkepartiet)	1
Centre Party (Senterpartiet)	4
Selbjørn common list (Selbjørn Fellesliste)	5
Non-party local list for Storekalsøy (Upolitisk Bygdeliste for Storeka1søy)	2
Total number of members:	27

Austevoll kommunestyre 1971–1975
Party name (in Nynorsk)	Number of representatives
Labour Party (Arbeidarpartiet)	5
Conservative Party (Høgre)	1
Christian Democratic Party (Kristeleg Folkeparti)	5
Centre Party (Senterpartiet)	2
Liberal Party (Venstre)	2
Local List(s) (Lokale lister)	12
Total number of members:	27

Austevoll kommunestyre 1967–1971
Party name (in Nynorsk)	Number of representatives
Local List(s) (Lokale lister)	27
Total number of members:	27

Austevoll kommunestyre 1963–1967
Party name (in Nynorsk)	Number of representatives
Local List(s) (Lokale lister)	27
Total number of members:	27

Austevoll heradsstyre 1959–1963
Party name (in Nynorsk)	Number of representatives
Local List(s) (Lokale lister)	23
Total number of members:	23

Austevoll heradsstyre 1955–1959
Party name (in Nynorsk)	Number of representatives
Local List(s) (Lokale lister)	23
Total number of members:	23

Austevoll heradsstyre 1951–1955
Party name (in Nynorsk)	Number of representatives
Local List(s) (Lokale lister)	16
Total number of members:	16

Austevoll heradsstyre 1947–1951
Party name (in Nynorsk)	Number of representatives
Local List(s) (Lokale lister)	16
Total number of members:	16

Austevoll heradsstyre 1945–1947
Party name (in Nynorsk)	Number of representatives
List of workers, fishermen, and small farmholders (Arbeidarar, fiskarar, småbrukarar liste)	3
Local List(s) (Lokale lister)	13
Total number of members:	16

Austevoll heradsstyre 1937–1941*
Party name (in Nynorsk)	Number of representatives
Labour Party (Arbeidarpartiet)	5
Joint List(s) of Non-Socialist Parties (Borgarlege Felleslister)	1
Local List(s) (Lokale lister)	10
Total number of members:	16
Note: Due to the German occupation of Norway during World War II, no elections were held for new municipal councils until after the war ended in 1945.

=== Mayors ===
The mayor (Nynorsk: ordførar) of Austevoll Municipality is the political leader of the municipality and the chairperson of the municipal council. Here is a list of people who have held this position:

#	Name	Office	Political Party	Occupation
1	Ole Olsen Strømme	1886–1901		Church bell ringer
2	Peder Olai Kleppe	1902–1919		Fisherman
3	Olai Naustheller	1920–1925		Farmer
4	Mikkel Nilsen Birkeland	1926–1935		Farmer
5	Magnus Larssen	1935–1937		School teacher
6	Salomon O. Fagerbakke	1938–1945		Fisherman
7	Salomon V. Kalvenes	1946–1959		Fisherman
8	Rikard S. Storebø	1960–1969	Liberal Party	Social security manager
9	Peder Kalve	1970–1975	Conservative Party	Maritime pilot
10	Magnus Stangeland	1976–1981	Centre Party	School principal
11	Knut K. Kalvenes	1982–1985	Conservative Party	Retailer
12	Hallvard Møgster	1986–1989	Christian Democratic Party	Captain
13	Inge Bjarne Storebø	1990–2001	Conservative Party	Bank manager
14	Olav P. Årland	2001–2003	Christian Democratic Party	Shipmaster
15	Helge André Njåstad	2003–2011	Progress Party	Student
16	Renate Møgster Klepsvik	2011–2015	Progress Party	
17	Morten Storebø	2015–2023	Conservative Party	Politician
18	Bente Kari Sletten Taranger	2023–present	Conservative Party	

== Notable people ==
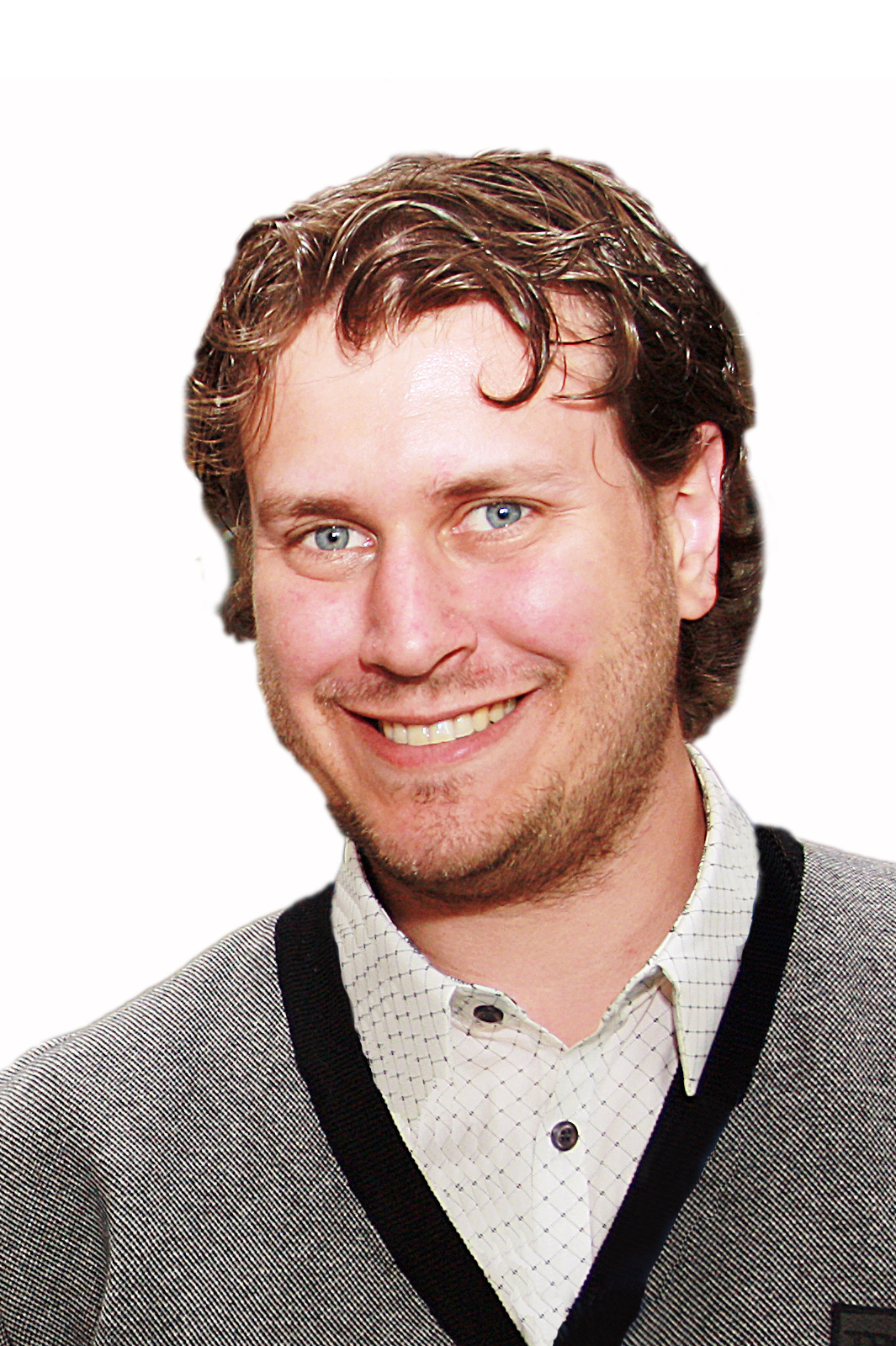
Helge André Njåstad, 2009

- Abelone Møgster, (Norwegian Wiki) (1883 in Austevoll – 1975), a merchant and Norwegian resistance fighter
- Magnus Stangeland (born 1941 in Austevoll), a politician, mayor of Austevoll, and entrepreneur
- Knut Fagerbakke (born 1952), a Norwegian politician who was Deputy Mayor of Trondheim
- Ole Rasmus Møgster (1958 – 2010), a businessperson with Austevoll Seafood
- Jan Bertin Østervold, (Norwegian Wiki) (born 1966 in Skien) known as Jan Thomas, a stylist and actor
- Claus Lundekvam (born 1973), a former footballer with 410 club caps and 40 for Norway
- Helge André Njåstad (born 1980), a Norwegian politician who was mayor of Austevoll from 2003 to 2013

=== 1920 Summer Olympics sailors ===
- Ole Olsen Østervold (1872–1936)
- Halvor Olai Møgster (1875–1950)
- Jan Olsen Østervold (1876–1945)
- Henrik Østervold (1878 in Austevoll – 1957)
- Kristian Olsen Østervold (1885–1960)
- Rasmus Ingvald Birkeland (1888–1972)
- Halvor Olai Birkeland (1894–1971)
