= Storebø =

Village in Austevoll Municipality, Norway

- Village
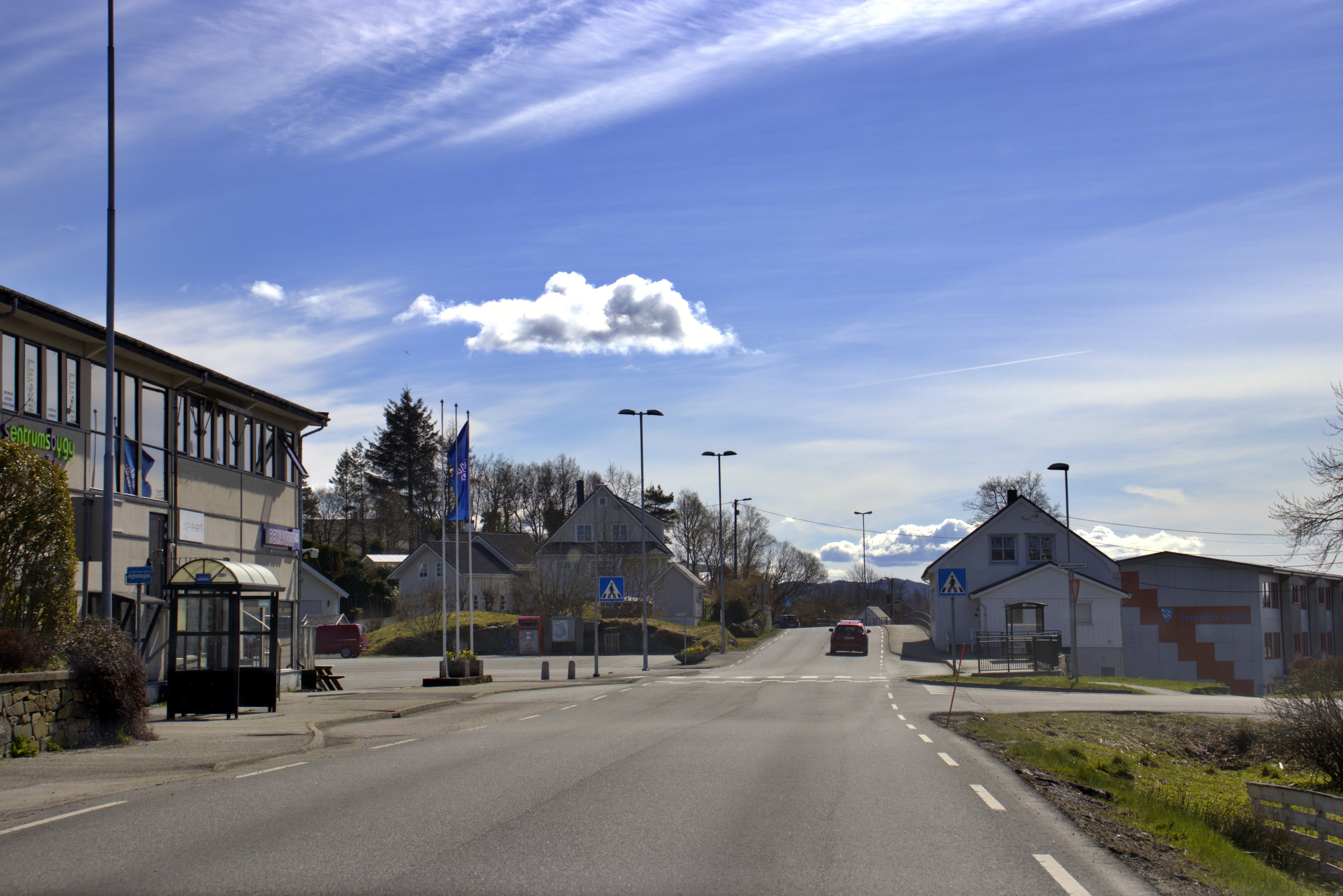
- View of the village
- Interactive map of Storebø
- Coordinates: 60.09294°N 5.23179°E
- Country: Norway
- Region: Western Norway
- County: Vestland
- District: Midhordland
- Municipality: Austevoll Municipality

Area
  - Total: 1.82 km^{2} (0.70 sq mi)
- Elevation: 45 m (148 ft)

Population (2025)
  - Total: 1,695
  - Density: 931/km^{2} (2,410/sq mi)
- Demonym: Storebøar
- Time zone: UTC+01:00 (CET)
  - Summer (DST): UTC+02:00 (CEST)
- Post Code: 5392, 5393 Storebø

Storebø is the administrative centre and largest village in Austevoll Municipality in Vestland county, Norway. The village is located on the northern part of the island of Huftarøy, just south of the village of Birkeland and northwest of the village of Haukanes.

The 1.82-square-kilometre (450-acre) village has a population (2025) of 1,695 and a population density of 931 inhabitants per square kilometre (2,410/sq mi).

== History ==
Population
Year	Pop.	±%
1960	581	—
1970	684	+17.7%
2011	1,136	+66.1%
2013	1,322	+16.4%
2016	1,377	+4.2%

The Austevoll Church, the main parish church in Austevoll Municipality, was historically located in the village of Austevoll on the island of Hundvåko until 1891 when it was moved and rebuilt at Storebø. The village of Storebø was made the administrative centre of the municipality in 1964. Prior to that, the meetings of the municipal council were held on the small island of Bakholmen, located a short distance west of Storebø.

=== Toponymy ===
The name Storebø has been in use since the mid-17th century, prior to that the village was called Bø or Bøe. It is thought that the prefix store-, literally meaning large, was added to separate it from Bø on the nearby island of Stord, since both farms were part of the Saint Mary's Abbey, Lyse. The Bø at Stord was renamed Litlabø, with the prefix litla- meaning small. The last element, bø, comes from Old Norse word that translates as farm.

== Economy ==
Traditionally, fishing and farming have long been the principal industries at Storebø. Farming has been largely replaced by other industries, however the fishing industry grew increasingly important during the second half of the 20th century. During the late 1970s and early 1980s, fish farming and oil-related industries were developed in the area. Today some of the largest companies in the world within these two industries are based at Storebø, including DOF and Austevoll Seafood, both companies listed on the Oslo Stock Exchange. The newspaper Marsteinen is published in Storebø.
