= Otterå =

Village in Austevoll Municipality, Norway

- Farm village
- Interactive map of Otterå
- Coordinates: 60.03029°N 5.29958°E
- Country: Norway
- Region: Western Norway
- County: Vestland
- District: Midhordland
- Municipality: Austevoll Municipality
- Elevation: 11 m (36 ft)
- Time zone: UTC+01:00 (CET)
  - Summer (DST): UTC+02:00 (CEST)
- Post Code: 5396 Vestre Vinnesvåg

Otterå is a small farm area in Austevoll Municipality in Vestland county, Norway.

== Location ==
Otterå is located on the eastern coast of the island of Huftarøy, the largest island in Austevoll Municipality. The farm village is located along the Langenuen strait, across from the island of Reksteren in Tysnes Municipality. The farm is located between the neighboring farms Såtendal and Brekke. A headland known as Otteråneset lies to the northeast of Otterå. County Road 546 runs on the west side of the farm area. Historically it was one large farm, but it has since been divided into two separate farms (eastern and western) with different owners, although they both share the same name. Today, there are many cabins surrounding the main farm.

== History ==
The farm has been in use since around 1600. The name (Otterå, Otteraano, Oteråni and similar spellings) refers to river that runs through the valley. It was historically part of Fitjar Municipality until the boundaries were changed in 1964 and it was transferred to Austevoll Municipality. The three neighboring farms of Husavik, Brekke, and Otterå had naturally close contact due to their proximity.

The first time the farm is mentioned in historical records is in 1590, however at that time it was deserted. In 1610, it was cleared, but in use by "ødegaardsmænd", so there were barren conditions. Since 1799, the land has been owned by the farmers who lived there. Lars Knutsson was the first farmer-landowner. Before that time, the land was owned and then leased to the farmer. Lars Knutsson had married Ildrid Jonsdotter Haukanes who had inherited the farm by his father. Before 1766, it was a part of greater estates in Sunnhordland, self-owned in shorter periods. In the first part of the 17th century, the nobleman Aksel Mowatt owned Otterå, and from 1660, Baron Louis Rosenkrantz was the owner. In the first part of the 18th century, the big farmers from Fitjar were the owners, before Ivar Nilsson Haukanes bought the farm in 1766.
