= Austevollshella =

Village in Austevoll Municipality, Norway

Austevollshella Austevoll
- Village
- Interactive map of Austevollshella; Austevoll
- Coordinates: 60.10588°N 5.16896°E
- Country: Norway
- Region: Western Norway
- County: Vestland
- District: Midhordland
- Municipality: Austevoll Municipality
- Elevation: 35 m (115 ft)
- Time zone: UTC+01:00 (CET)
  - Summer (DST): UTC+02:00 (CEST)
- Post Code: 5384 Torangsvåg

Austevollshella or Austevoll is a village in Austevoll Municipality, Norway. Austevollshella is located on the southeastern coast of the island of Hundvåko. The Austevoll Bridge, which connects the islands of Hundvåko and Huftarøy, is located at Austevollshella. The village has been the site of a church since the Middle Ages. Austevoll Church was located here until 1890 when it was torn down and rebuilt in the larger village of Storebø on the island of Huftarøy to the east. One hundred years later, Hundvåkøy Chapel was built at Austevollshella to serve the people of the island.
