= Drøna =

Island in Vestland, Norway

Drøna Drøni
- Interactive map of the island

Geography
- Location: Vestland, Norway
- Coordinates: 60.0621°N 5.1830°E
- Archipelago: Austevoll
- Area: 1 km^{2} (0.39 sq mi)
- Length: 3 km (1.9 mi)
- Width: 500 m (1600 ft)
- Coastline: 6.7 km (4.16 mi)
- Highest elevation: 56 m (184 ft)

Administration
- Norway
- County: Vestland
- Municipality: Austevoll Municipality

Drøna is an island in Austevoll Municipality in Vestland county, Norway. The 1-square-kilometre (250-acre) island lies just off the west coast of the larger island of Huftarøy. There is a road bridge over the 7-metre (23 ft) wide channel of water separating Drøna from Huftarøy.

== See also ==
- List of islands of Norway
