= Husavik, Norway =

Village in Austevoll Municipality, Norway

Husavik
- Village
- Interactive map of Husavik
- Coordinates: 60.01854°N 5.28359°E
- Country: Norway
- Region: Western Norway
- County: Vestland
- District: Midhordland
- Municipality: Austevoll Municipality
- Elevation: 8 m (26 ft)
- Time zone: UTC+01:00 (CET)
  - Summer (DST): UTC+02:00 (CEST)
- Post Code: 5396 Vestre Vinnesvåg

Husavik is a village in Austevoll Municipality in Vestland county, Norway. The village is located in the Vestre Vinnesvåg area along the southeastern shore of the island of Huftarøy, about 1 kilometre (0.62 mi) northeast of the village of Vinnes and about 2 kilometres (1.2 mi) south of the farming village of Otterå.

The village is a regular stop for a ferry service connecting the islands of Austevoll Municipality to the large island of Stord to the south, across the Selbjørnsfjorden.

== History ==
The village was one of the first villages in Austevoll Municipality to gain industrial jobs. An engine factory was built here in 1910.
