= Huftarøy =

Island in Vestland, Norway

- Interactive map of Huftarøy

Geography
- Location: Vestland, Norway
- Coordinates: 59.9964°N 5.2568°E
- Archipelago: Austevoll
- Area: 50.4 km^{2} (19.5 sq mi)
- Length: 14.8 km (9.2 mi)
- Width: 6.8 km (4.23 mi)
- Highest elevation: 244 m (801 ft)
- Highest point: Loddo

Administration
- Norway
- County: Vestland
- Municipality: Austevoll Municipality

Demographics
- Population: 2,435
- Pop. density: 48.3/km^{2} (125.1/sq mi)

Huftarøy is the largest island in Austevoll Municipality in Vestland county, Norway. The 50.4-square-kilometre (19.5 sq mi) island lies in the Austevoll archipelago, just west of the Bjørnafjorden, south of the Krossfjorden, east of the Mokstrafjorden, and north of the Selbjørnsfjorden. The largest settlement on the island is the village of Storebø on the northern part of the island (Storebø is the administrative centre of the municipality.)

== Location ==
The 1.53-square-kilometre (380-acre) village of Storebø has a population (2013) of 1,322; giving the village a population density of 864 inhabitants per square kilometre (2,240/sq mi). Austevoll Church (Norwegian: Austevoll kirke), located in the village of Storebø, is the main church for the island. Other villages on the island include Birkeland, Haukanes, Husavik, Kolbeinsvik, Otterå, and Vinnes.

== Transportation ==
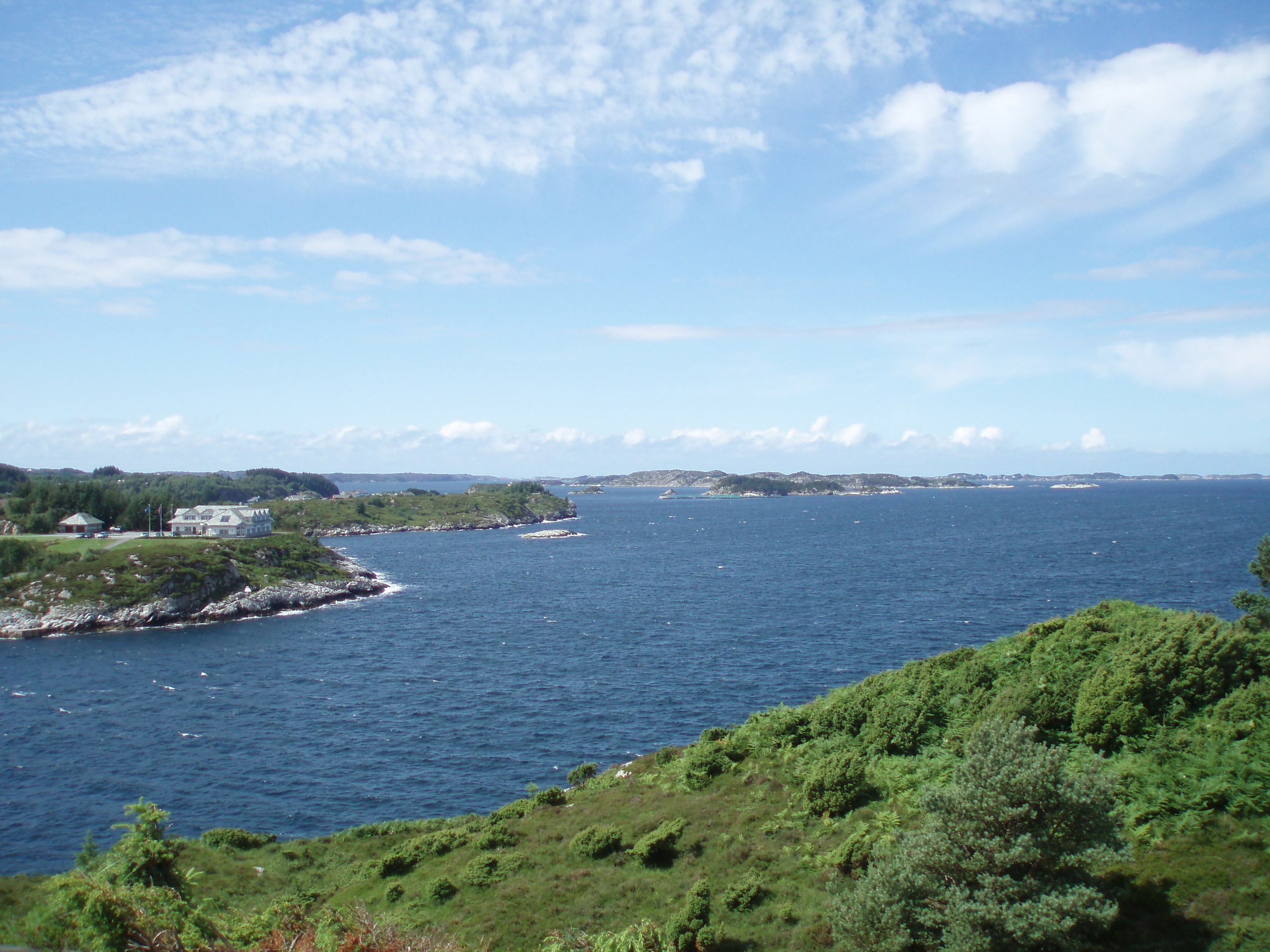
Bekkjarvik strait separates Huftarøy from Selbjørn

The island currently has no bridge or tunnel connections (as of 2025), however the planned Hordfast bridge-tunnel network may connect the island to the mainland. This project is currently in the planning stages and the Austevoll option is one of several possibilities.

The island has two regular ferry connections. The northern ferry stops at Hufthammar and runs northward to Krokeide (near Fanahammaren in Bergen Municipality) on the mainland. The southern ferry stops at Husavik and it runs southward to Sandvika on the island of Stord and on to Tysnes Municipality. The island of Stord is connected to the mainland by an undersea tunnel.

There are several smaller islands surrounding Huftarøy which are connected to each other by road bridges. The Storholmbrua-Austevollsbrua bridge network connects Huftarøy to the islands of Hundvåko and Storakalsøy to the northwest. Two very short causeways connect Huftarøy to the small islands of Drøna and Rostøya to the west. The Selbjørn Bridge runs across the Bekkjarvik Strait connecting to the islands of Selbjørn and Stolmen.

== See also ==
- List of islands of Norway
