= Hundvåko =

Island in Vestland, Norway

Hundvåko Hundvåkøy (unofficial)
- Interactive map of the island

Geography
- Location: Vestland, Norway
- Coordinates: 60.1231°N 5.1437°E
- Archipelago: Austevoll
- Area: 10.7 km^{2} (4.1 sq mi)
- Length: 6.9 km (4.29 mi)
- Width: 2.4 km (1.49 mi)
- Highest elevation: 76 m (249 ft)
- Highest point: Kongsvarden

Administration
- Norway
- County: Vestland
- Municipality: Austevoll Municipality

Demographics
- Population: 671 (2017)

Hundvåko is an island in Austevoll Municipality in Vestland county, Norway. The 10.7-square-kilometre (4.1 sq mi) island lies southeast of the island of Storakalsøy and northwest of the large island of Huftarøy. There are bridge connections to both of those islands.

The main population centres on Hundvåko are the villages of Austevollshella and Toranger. The island has a population (in 2017) of 671 inhabitants.

The island is rocky and barren with few forested areas and much heathland. There are flocks of wild spælsau sheep that live year-round on the island in the heathland. This breed of sheep has roamed on the island since Viking times.

== See also ==
- List of islands of Norway
