= Solheim Church =

Solheim Church may refer to:

- Solheim Church (Bergen), a church in Bergen municipality, Vestland county, Norway
- Solheim Church (Masfjorden), a church in Masfjorden municipality, Vestland county, Norway
