= Biskopshavn Church =

Church in Vestland, Norway

- Biskopshavn kirke
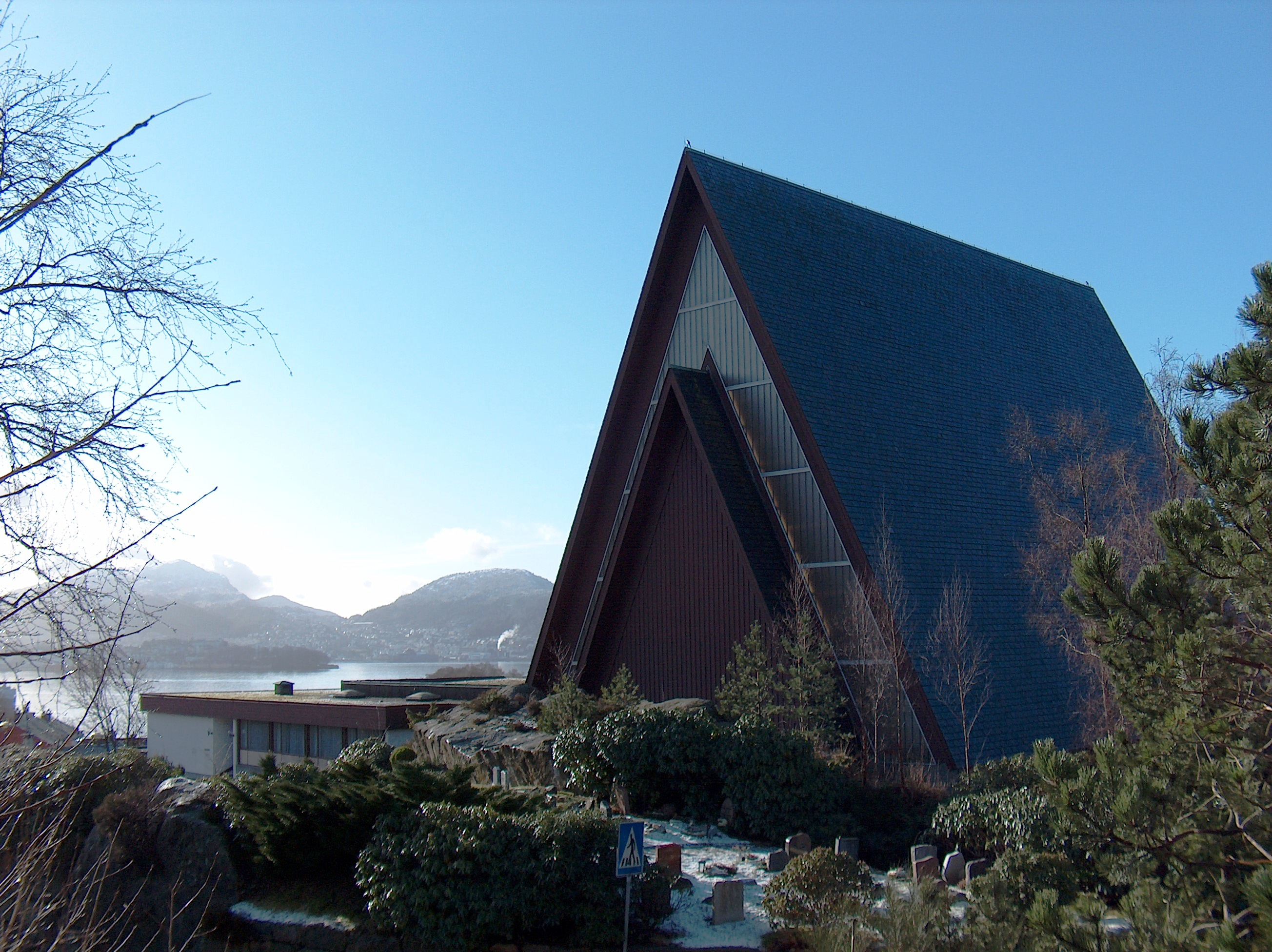
- View of the church
- Biskopshavn Church
- 60°25′29″N 5°17′54″E
- Location: Bergen Municipality, Vestland
- Country: Norway
- Denomination: Church of Norway
- Churchmanship: Evangelical Lutheran

History
- Status: Parish church
- Founded: 1966
- Consecrated: 4 Dec 1966

Architecture
- Functional status: Active
- Architect(s): Jakob Myklebust, Bjørn Simonnæs, Helge Borgen
- Architectural type: Long church
- Completed: 1966 (60 years ago)

Specifications
- Capacity: 500
- Materials: Brick

Administration
- Diocese: Bjørgvin bispedømme
- Deanery: Åsane prosti
- Parish: Biskopshavn
- Norwegian Cultural Heritage Site
- Type: Church
- Status: Listed by municipality
- ID: 83891

Biskopshavn Church (Norwegian: Biskopshavn kirke) is a parish church of the Church of Norway in Bergen Municipality in Vestland county, Norway. It is located in the Biskopshavn neighborhood in the city of Bergen. It is the church for the Biskopshavn parish which is part of the Åsane prosti (deanery) in the Diocese of Bjørgvin. The large brick church was built in a long church design in 1966 using plans drawn up by the architects Jakob Myklebust, Bjørn Simonnæs, and Helge Borgen. The church seats about 500 people.

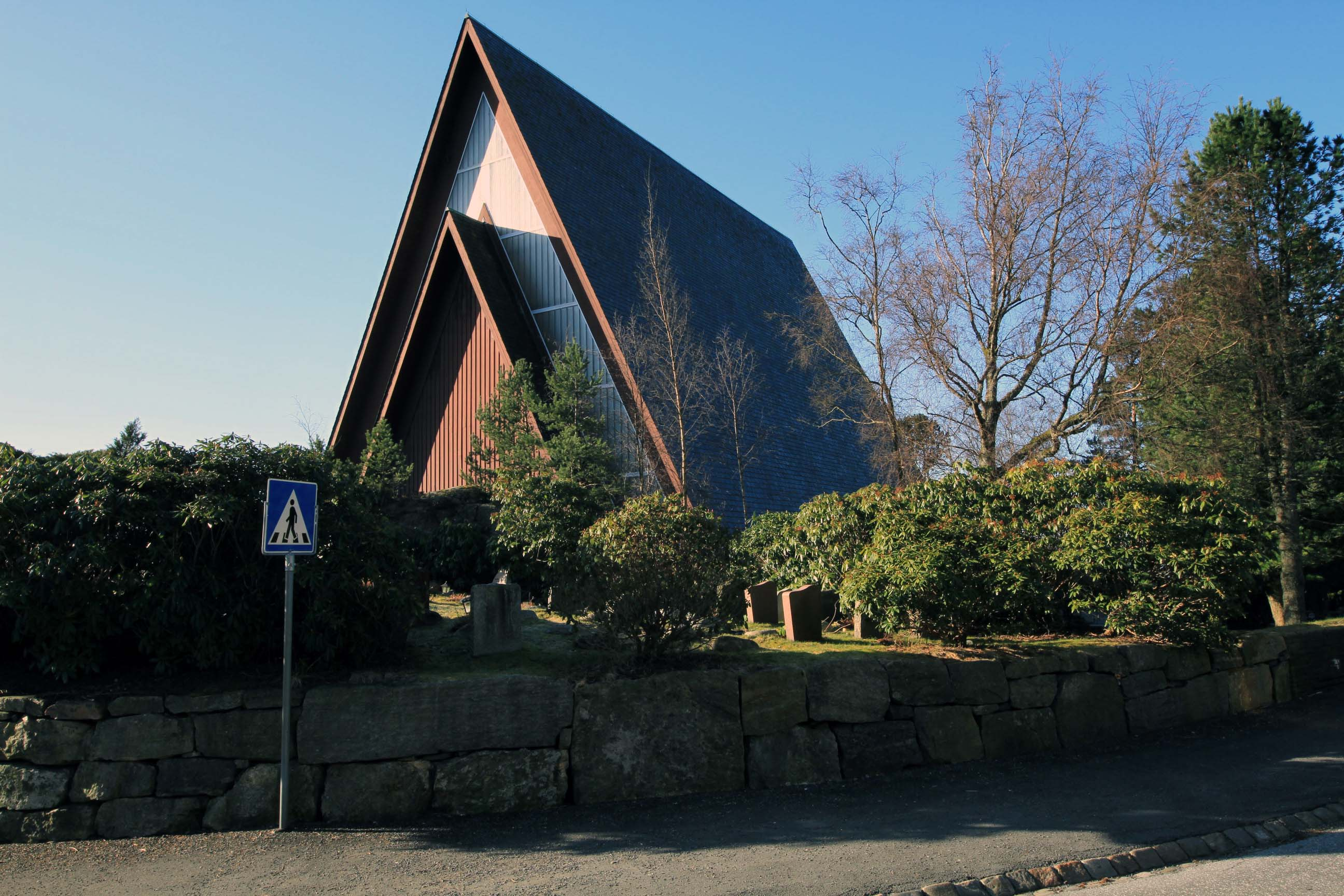
View of the church

== History ==
The Biskopshavn congregation was split from Sandviken Church by Royal Decree on 21 June 1957. After this, planning for a church home for the new congregation began. The architects Jakob Myklebust, Bjørn Simonnæs, and Helge Borgen won the competition and the foundation stone was laid on 21 November 1965. The church was completed in about a year, and it was consecrated on 4 December 1966. There is an entrance and a foyer in the southwest. On the southeast side is a complex extension with a flat roof that houses, among other things, the sacristy, church hall, daycare rooms, and offices. A free-standing belltower is located just west of the church.

== See also ==
- List of churches in Bjørgvin
