= Stongfjorden Chapel =

Church in Vestland, Norway

- Stongfjorden bedehuskapell
- Stongfjorden Chapel
- 61°25′43″N 5°10′11″E
- Location: Askvoll Municipality, Vestland
- Country: Norway
- Denomination: Church of Norway
- Churchmanship: Evangelical Lutheran

History
- Status: Chapel
- Founded: 1908
- Consecrated: 6 December 1914

Architecture
- Functional status: Active
- Architect: Martinus Haugen
- Architectural type: Long church
- Completed: 1908 (118 years ago)
- Closed: 1 August 2014

Specifications
- Capacity: 300
- Materials: Wood

Administration
- Diocese: Bjørgvin bispedømme
- Deanery: Sunnfjord prosti
- Parish: Askvoll
- Norwegian Cultural Heritage Site
- Type: Church
- Status: Not protected
- ID: 85575

Stongfjorden Chapel (Norwegian: Stongfjorden bedehuskapell) is a chapel of the Church of Norway in Askvoll Municipality in Vestland county, Norway. It is located in the village of Stongfjorden. It is one of three annex chapels in the Askvoll parish which is part of the Sunnfjord prosti (deanery) in the Diocese of Bjørgvin. The white, wooden chapel was built in 1908 in a long church design using plans drawn up by the architect Martinus Haugen. The chapel seats about 300 people.

== History ==
The chapel was originally constructed as a prayer house (bedehus) in 1908. The cost of the building was 6643 kr. Initially, the parish held two worship services per year at the prayer house. Soon after, it was decided to upgrade the building to a chapel. It was consecrated for regular church use on 6 December 1914 by the local dean Jonas Rein Landmark. This meant that the church would now have six worship services per year. During the 1960s, the basement was finished with a kitchen, dining hall, and bathrooms. In 1970, a choir was added to the building and in 1971, a new belltower with steeple were added. On 1 August 2014, the chapel was taken out of regular use. This means that regular worship services are no longer held there, however, the church can still be used on special occasions.

== Media gallery ==
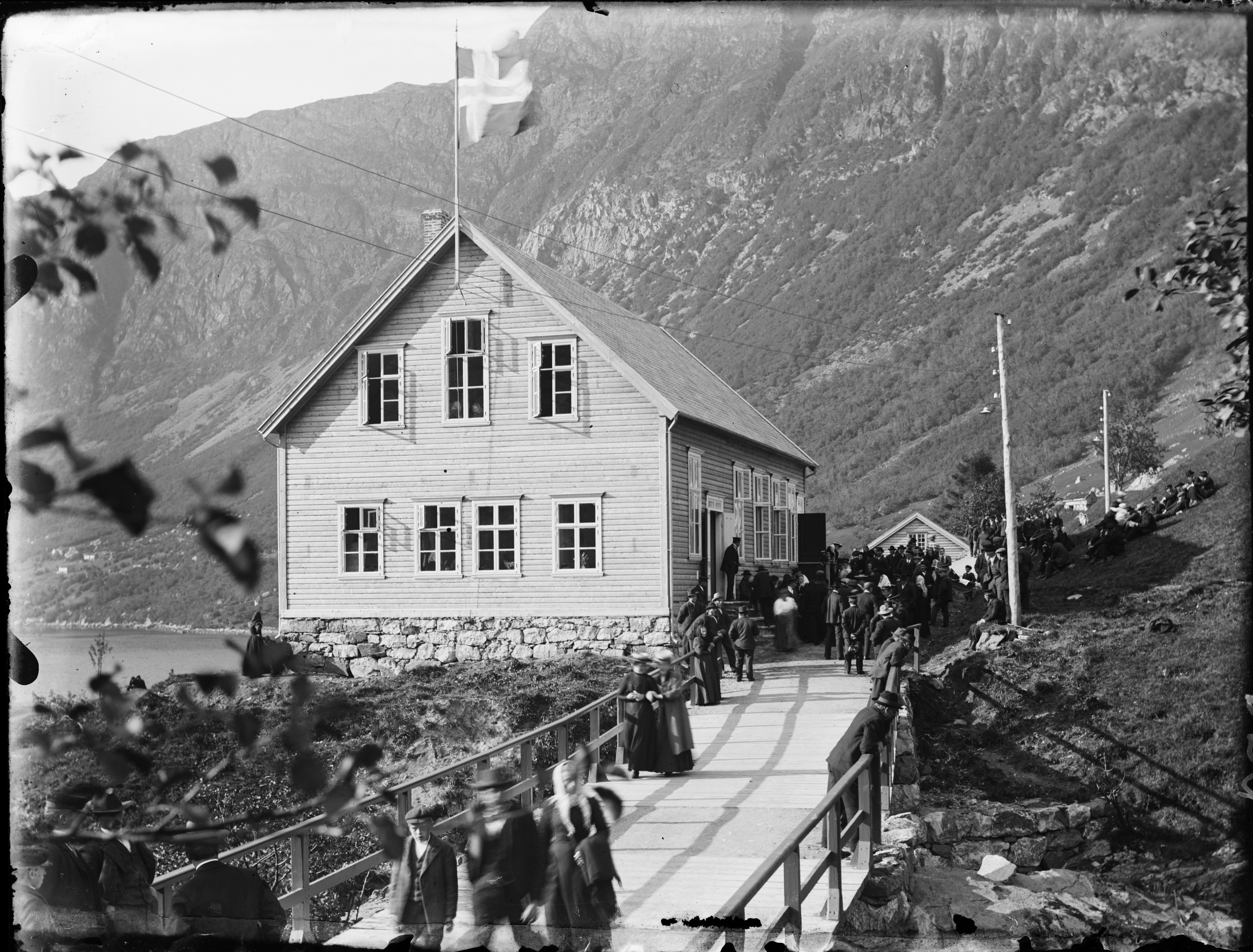
Original design of the church

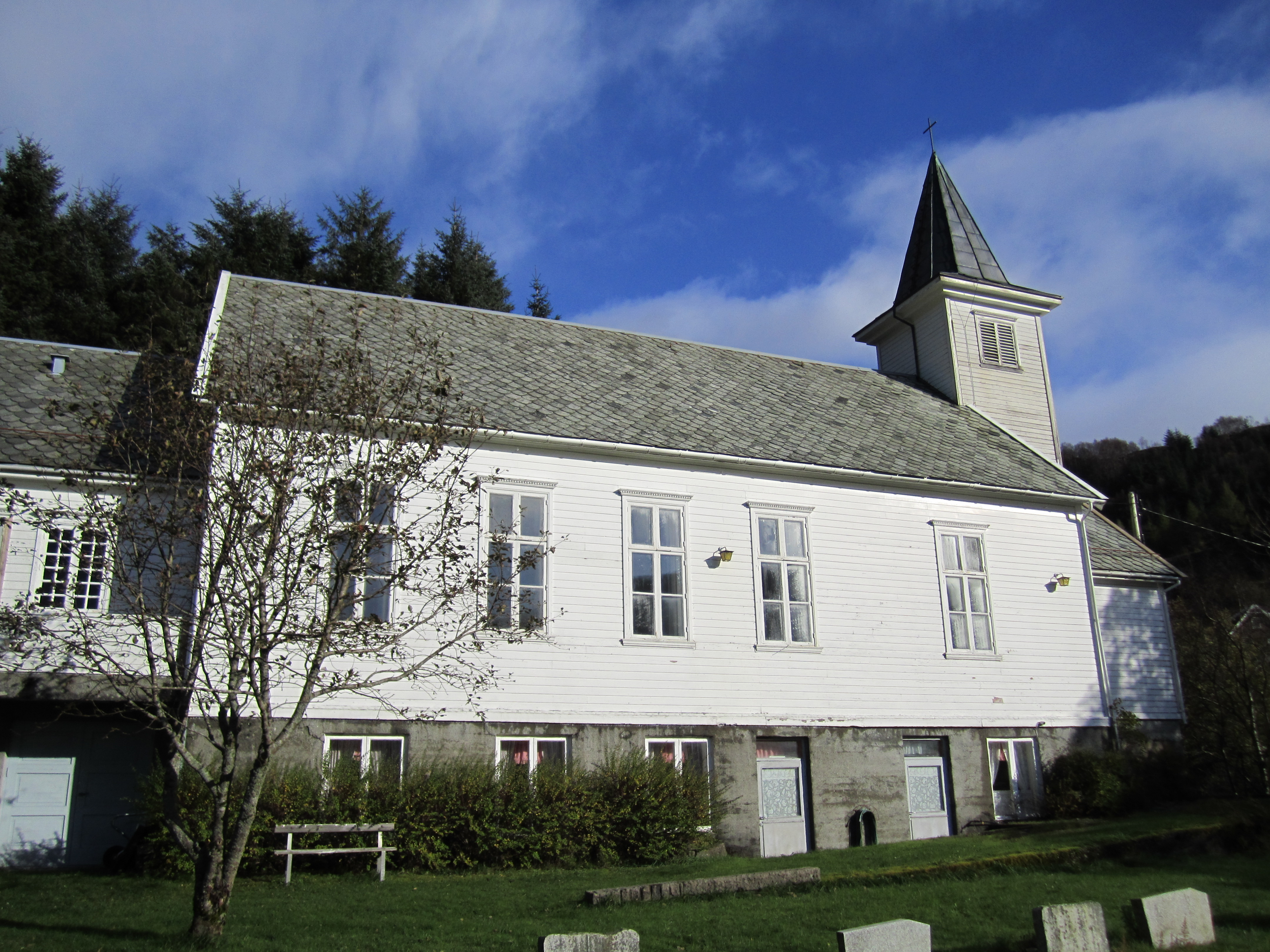
Present design of the church

== See also ==
- List of churches in Bjørgvin
