= Ytrebygda Church =

Church in Vestland, Norway

- Ytrebygda nærkirke
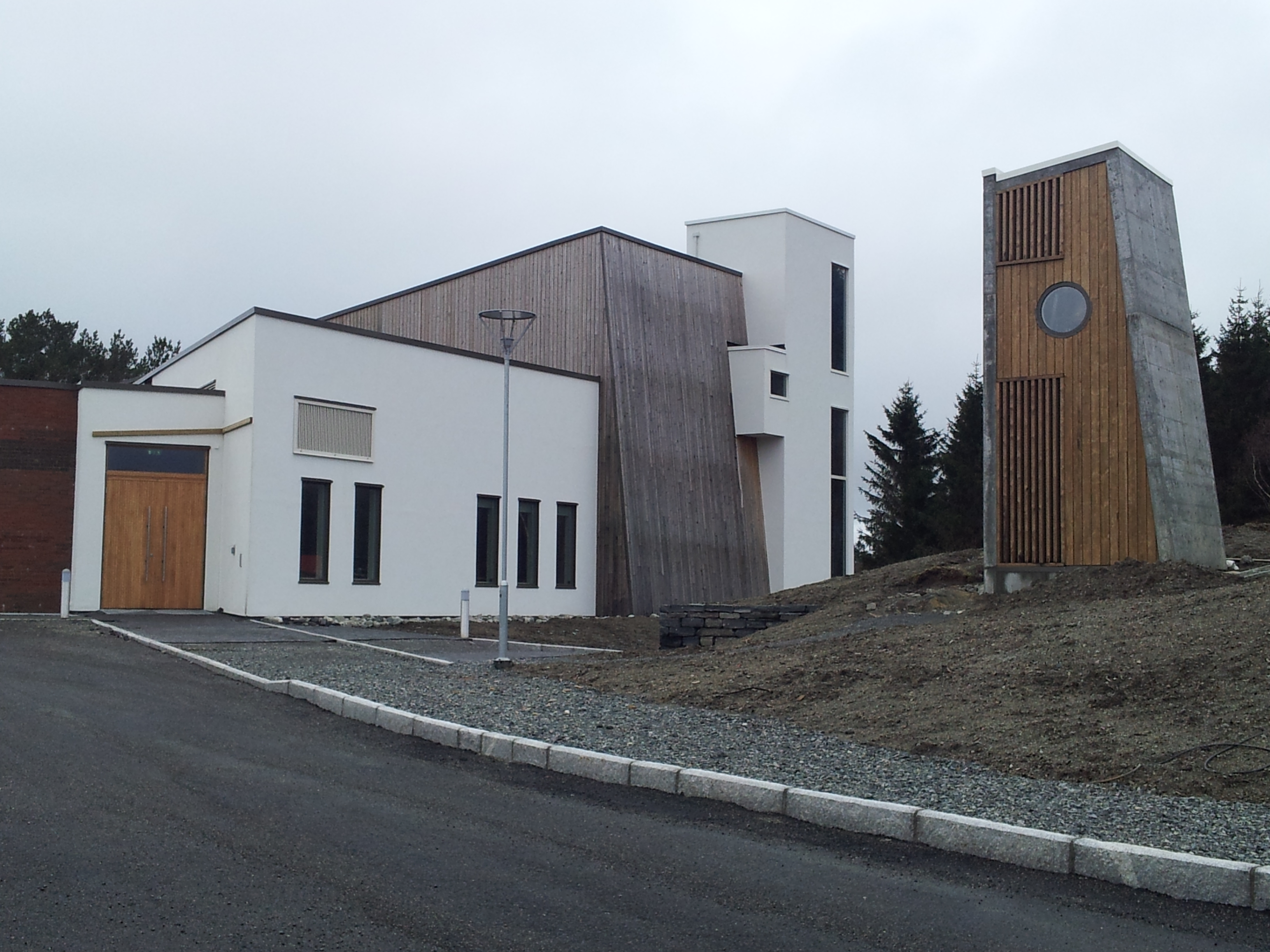
- View of the church
- Ytrebygda Church
- 60°16′57″N 5°15′11″E
- Location: Bergen Municipality, Vestland
- Country: Norway
- Denomination: Church of Norway
- Churchmanship: Evangelical Lutheran

History
- Status: Parish church
- Founded: 2011
- Consecrated: 18 Dec 2011

Architecture
- Functional status: Active
- Architect(s): ABO Plan & Arkitektur
- Architectural type: Rectangular
- Completed: 2011 (15 years ago)

Specifications
- Capacity: 210
- Materials: Concrete and Wood

Administration
- Diocese: Bjørgvin bispedømme
- Deanery: Fana prosti
- Parish: Fana

Ytrebygda Church (Norwegian: Ytrebygda kirke or Ytrebygda nærkirke) is a parish church of the Church of Norway in Bergen Municipality in Vestland county, Norway. It is located in the village of Blomsterdalen in the borough of Ytrebygda in the city of Bergen (just a little east of Bergen Flesland Airport). It is one of two churches for the Fana parish which is part of the Fana prosti (deanery) in the Diocese of Bjørgvin. The concrete and wood church was built in a rectangular style in 2011 using designs by the architectural firm ABO Plan & Arkitektur. The church seats about 210 people.

== History ==
The church in Ytrebygda was built in 2010-2011 using plans by the architectural firm ABO Plan & Arkitektur. The new building was consecrated on 18 December 2011 by the Bishop Halvor Nordhaug.

== Media gallery ==
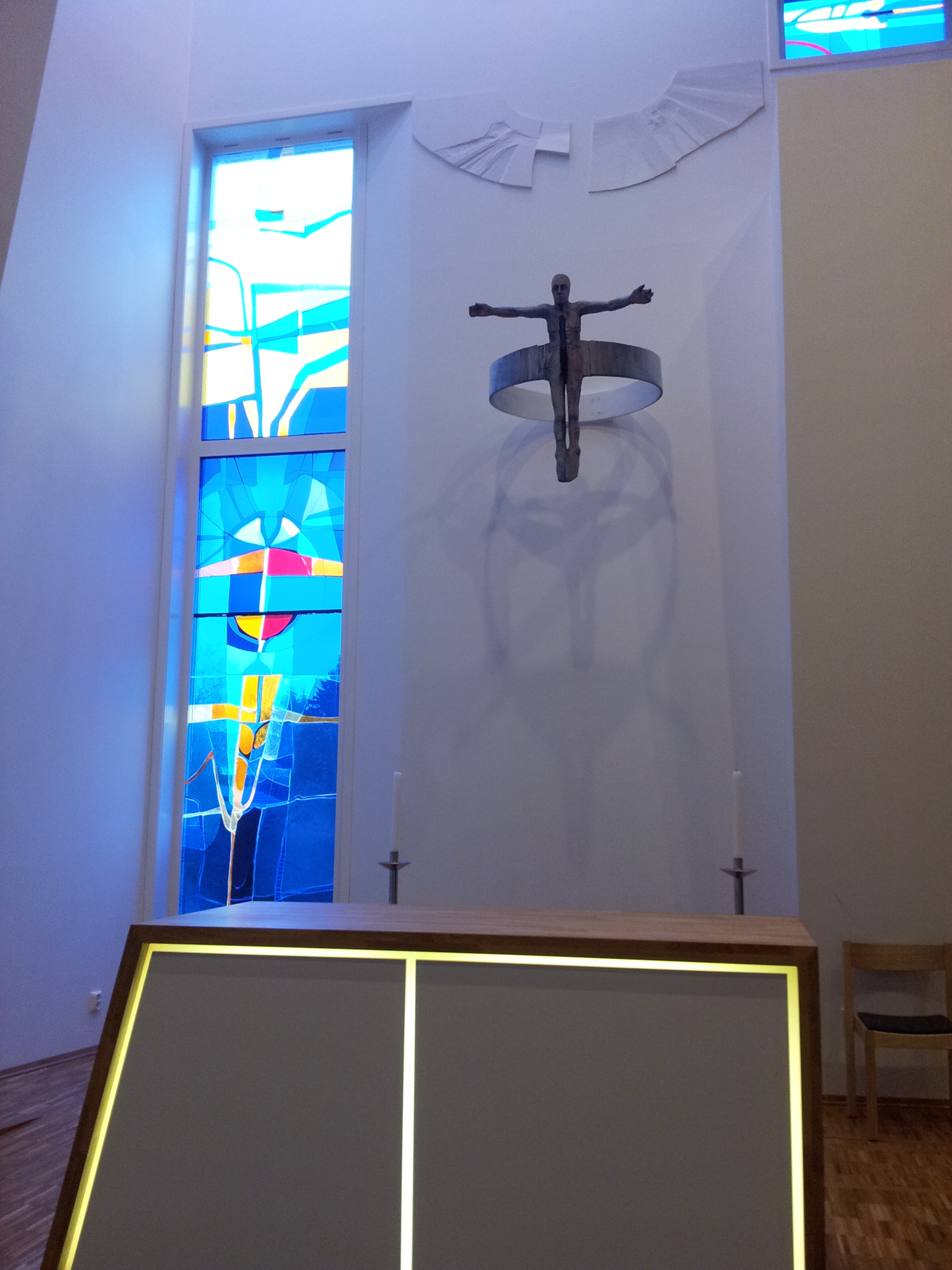

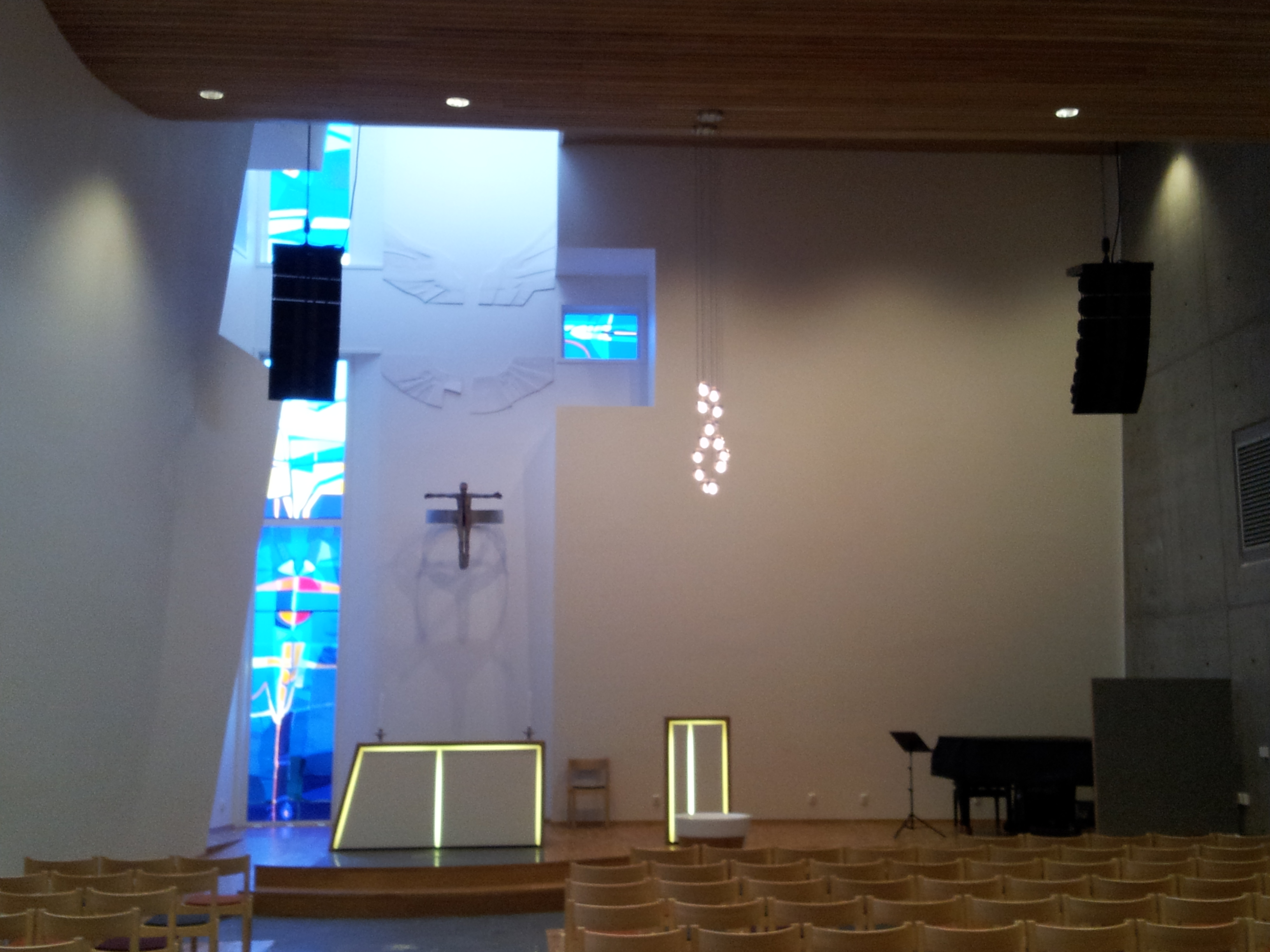

== See also ==
- List of churches in Bjørgvin
