= Takvam Chapel =

Church in Vestland, Norway

- Takvam kapell
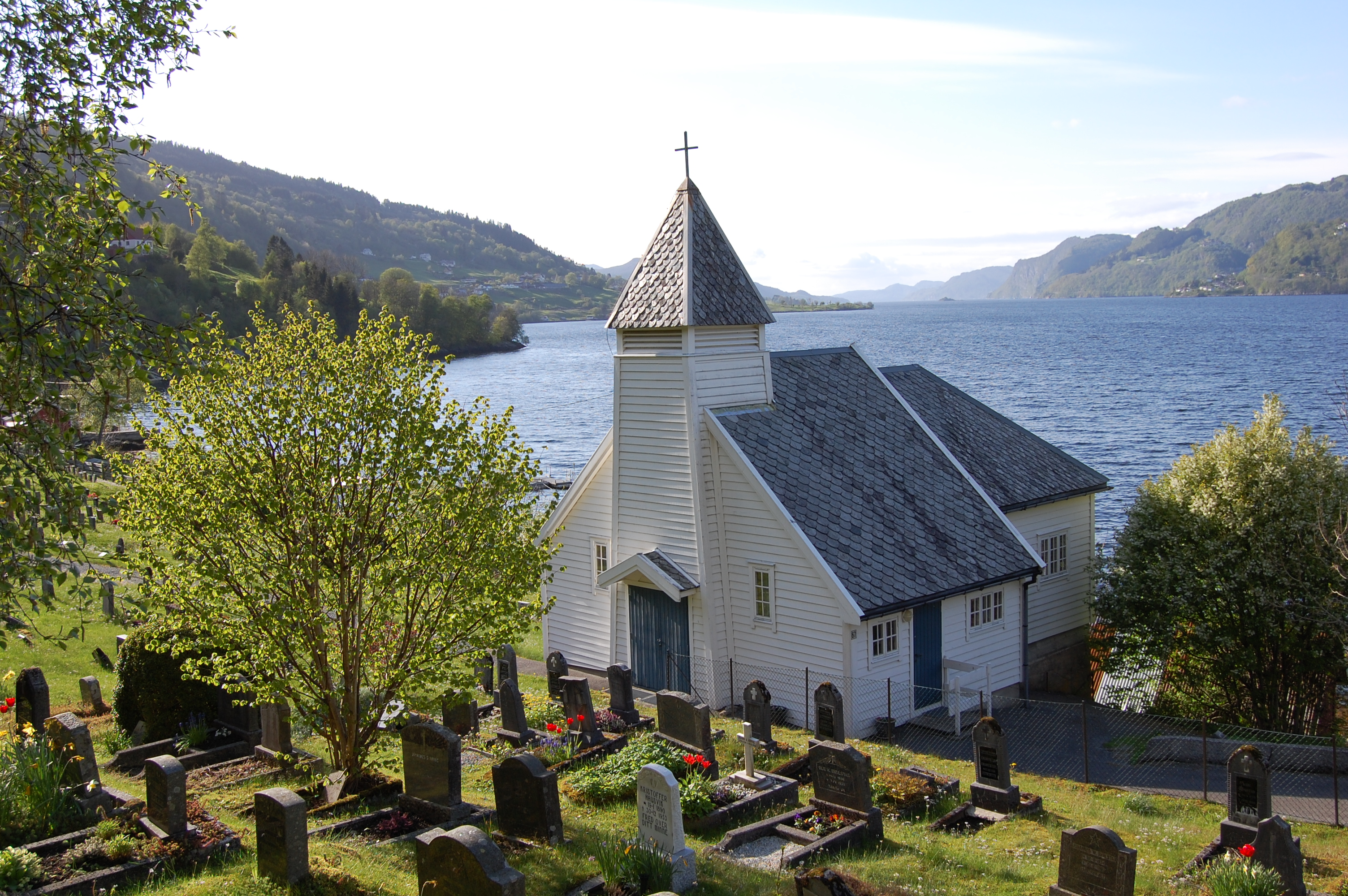
- View of the church
- Takvam Chapel
- 60°25′15″N 5°31′33″E
- Location: Bergen Municipality, Vestland
- Country: Norway
- Denomination: Church of Norway
- Churchmanship: Evangelical Lutheran

History
- Status: Parish church
- Founded: 1926
- Consecrated: 5 June 1988

Architecture
- Functional status: Active
- Architect: Andreas Vold
- Architectural type: Rectangular
- Completed: 1988 (38 years ago)

Specifications
- Capacity: 75
- Materials: Wood

Administration
- Diocese: Bjørgvin bispedømme
- Deanery: Åsane prosti
- Parish: Arna

Takvam Chapel (Norwegian: Takvam kapell) is a parish church of the Church of Norway in Bergen Municipality in Vestland county, Norway. It is located in the village of Takvam, in the eastern part of the municipality. It is one of two churches in the Arna parish which is part of the Åsane prosti (deanery) in the Diocese of Bjørgvin. The white, wooden church was built in a rectangular design in 1988 using plans drawn up by the architect Andreas Vold. The church seats about 75 people.

== History ==
In 1912, a graveyard was built in Takvam to serve the local population. In the 1920s, the idea of building a chapel at the graveyear to serve the Takvam area gained momentum. The architect Ivar Namtveit was hired to build the chapel. It was consecrated on 1 April 1926. It was a simple wooden building with a tower over the south entrance. In 1956-1957, a sacristy was built on the east side of the building. By the 1980s, the chapel was in very poor condition with significant rot damage. In 1988, the old chapel was torn down and a new building was constructed in the spring of 1988. The new chapel was consecrated on 5 June 1988 and it now has the status of a church, although the name "chapel" is still used.

== Media gallery ==
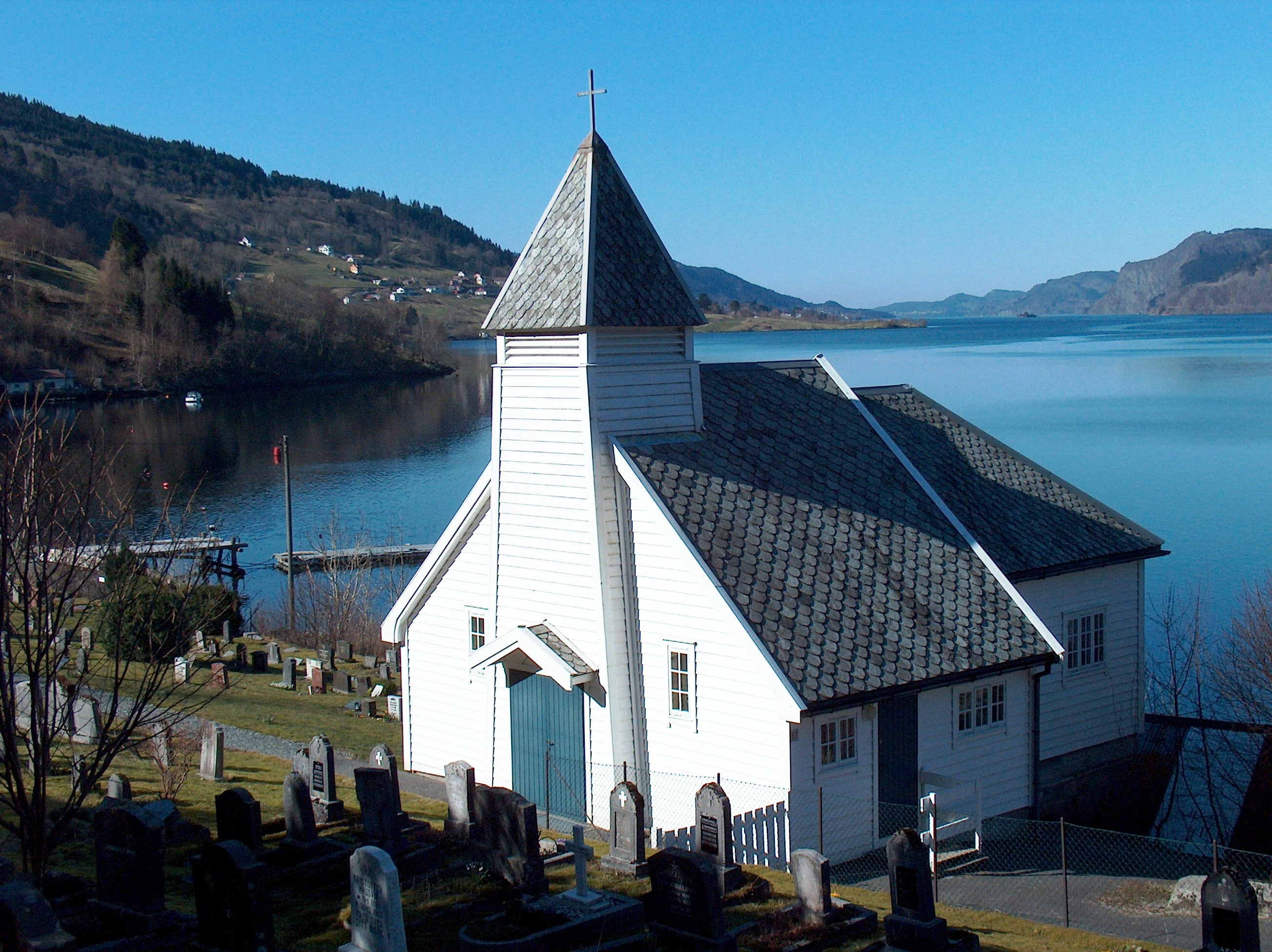

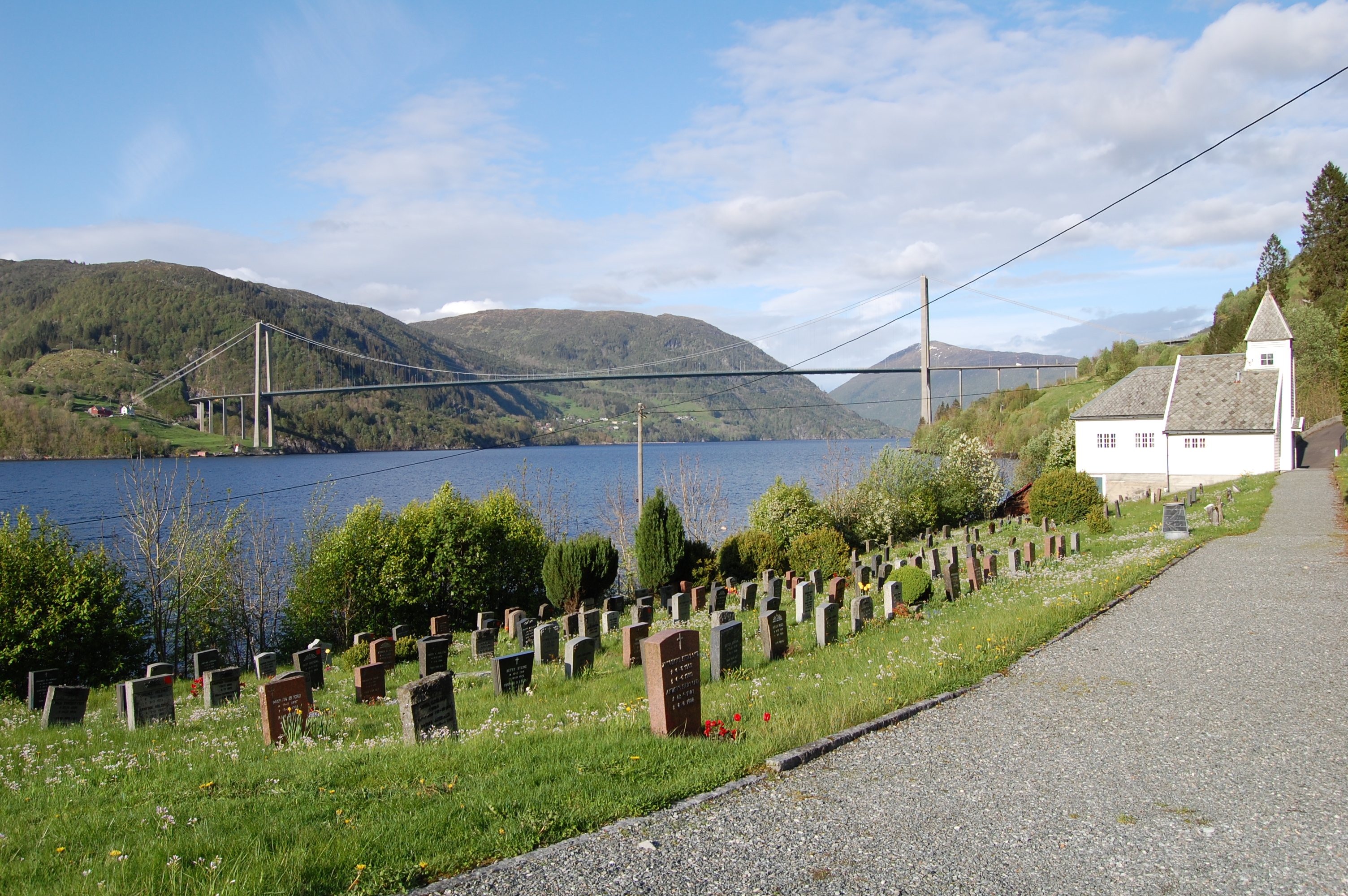

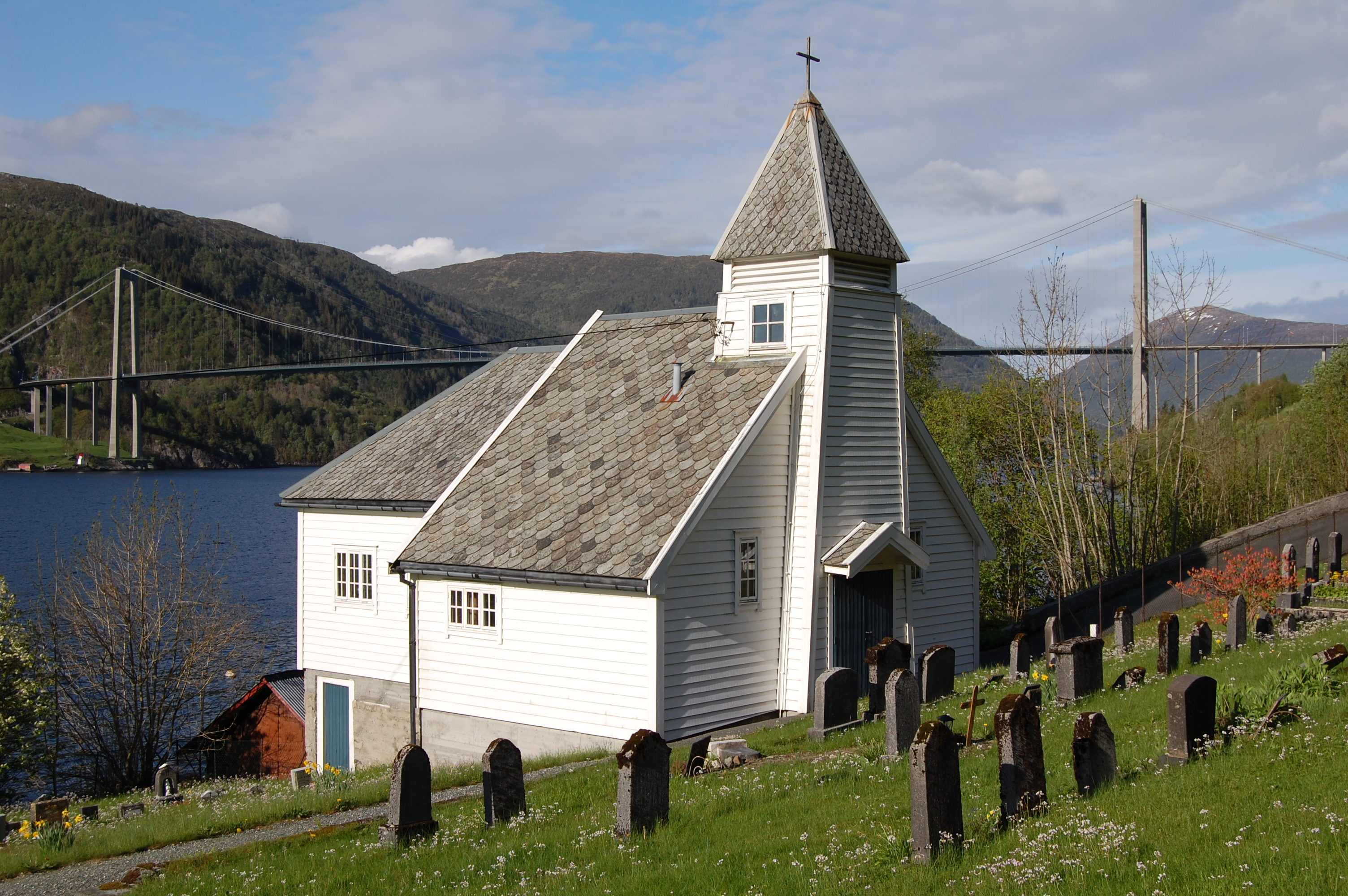

== See also ==
- List of churches in Bjørgvin
