= Fyllingsdalen Church =

Church in Vestland, Norway

- Fyllingsdalen kirke
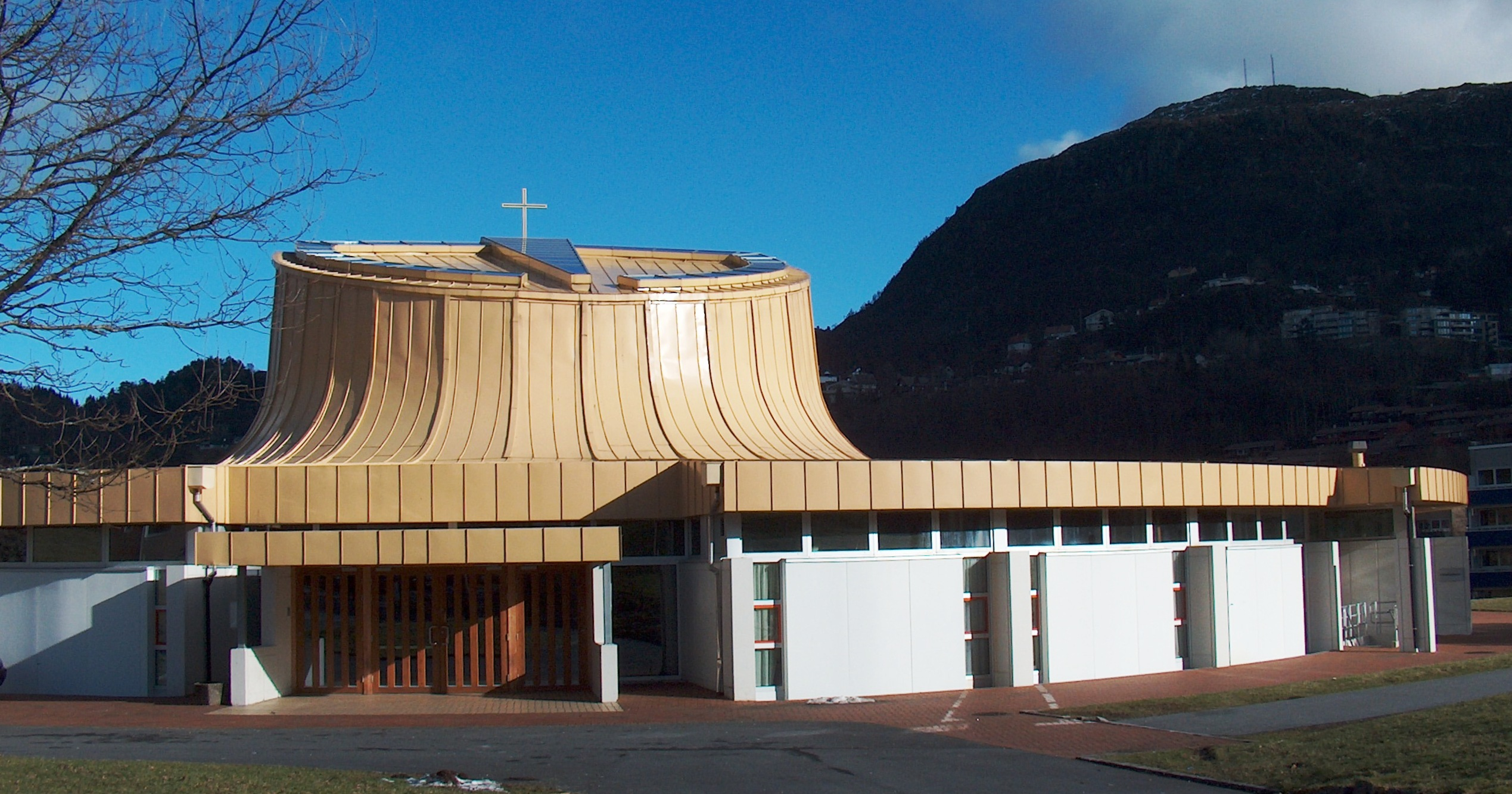
- View of the church
- Fyllingsdalen Church
- 60°21′11″N 5°17′47″E
- Location: Bergen, Vestland
- Country: Norway
- Denomination: Church of Norway
- Churchmanship: Evangelical Lutheran

History
- Status: Parish church
- Founded: 1976
- Consecrated: 3 Dec 1976

Architecture
- Functional status: Active
- Architect: Helge Hjertholm
- Architectural type: Fan-shaped
- Style: Modern
- Groundbreaking: 1974
- Completed: 1976 (50 years ago)

Specifications
- Capacity: 350
- Materials: Concrete/brick

Administration
- Diocese: Bjørgvin bispedømme
- Deanery: Bergensdalen prosti
- Parish: Fyllingsdalen
- Norwegian Cultural Heritage Site
- Type: Church
- Status: Protected
- ID: 84216

Fyllingsdalen Church (Norwegian: Fyllingsdalen kirke) is a parish church of the Church of Norway in Bergen Municipality in Vestland county, Norway. It is located in the Fyllingsdalen borough of the city of Bergen. It is the church for the Fyllingsdalen parish which is part of the Bergensdalen prosti (deanery) in the Diocese of Bjørgvin. The white, concrete church was built in a fan-shaped design in 1976 using plans drawn up by the architect Helge Hjertholm. The church seats about 350 people, but it expandable up to about 600.

== History ==
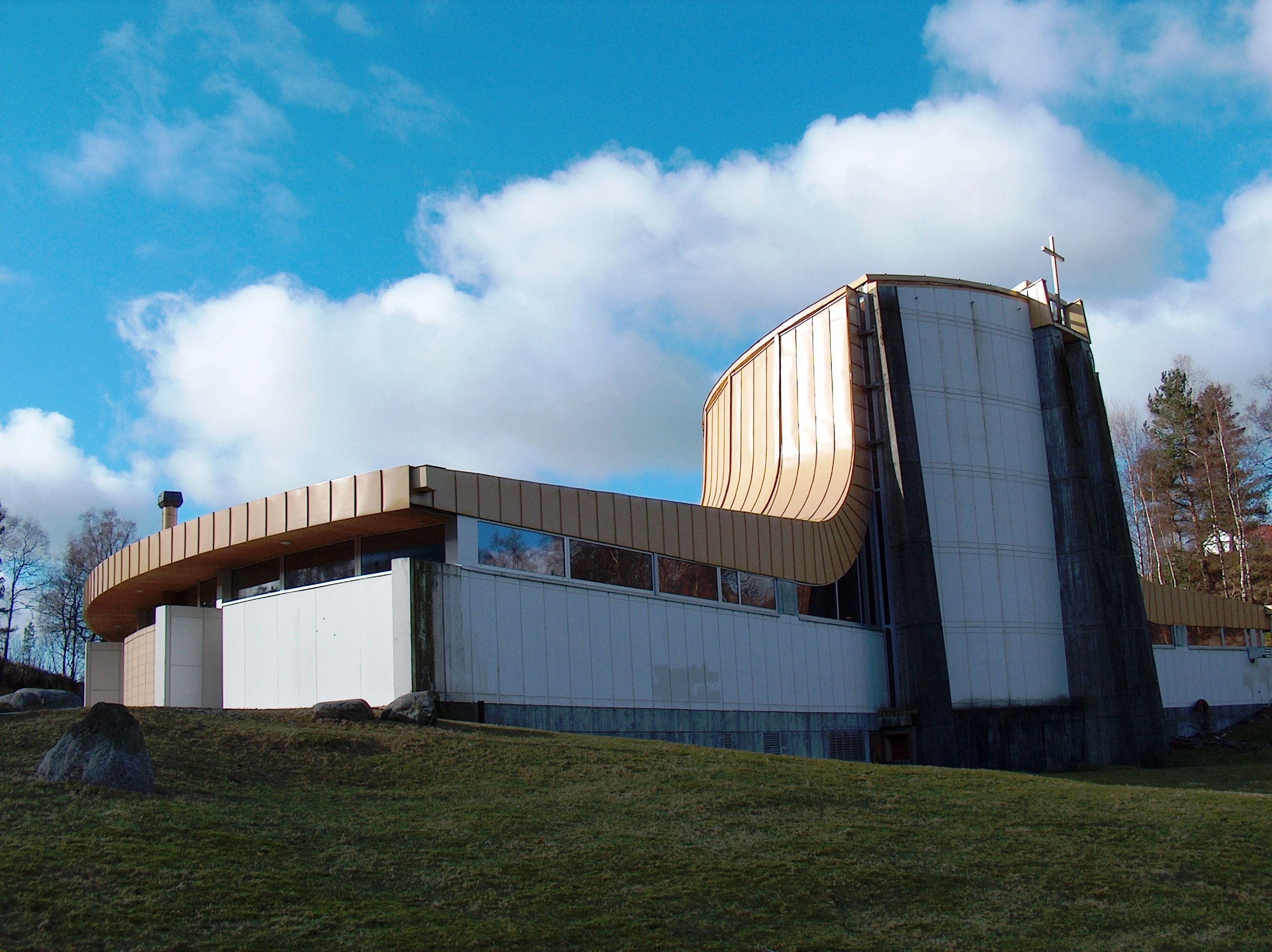
View of the church

In 1966, the new Fyllingsdalen parish was established. A rented interim church space was in use right away. Planning for a church for the parish began soon afterwards. In 1968, Helge Hjertholm was hired to design the new church (he had designed other nearby churches as well). He designed a modern-looking church with a unique curved roofline. Construction on the church took place from 1974-1976. The new building was consecrated on 3 December 1976.

== See also ==
- List of churches in Bjørgvin
- Informationen zur Jehmlich Orgel in der Kirche von Fyllingsdalen
