= Raundalen Church =

Church in Vestland, Norway

- Raundalen kyrkje
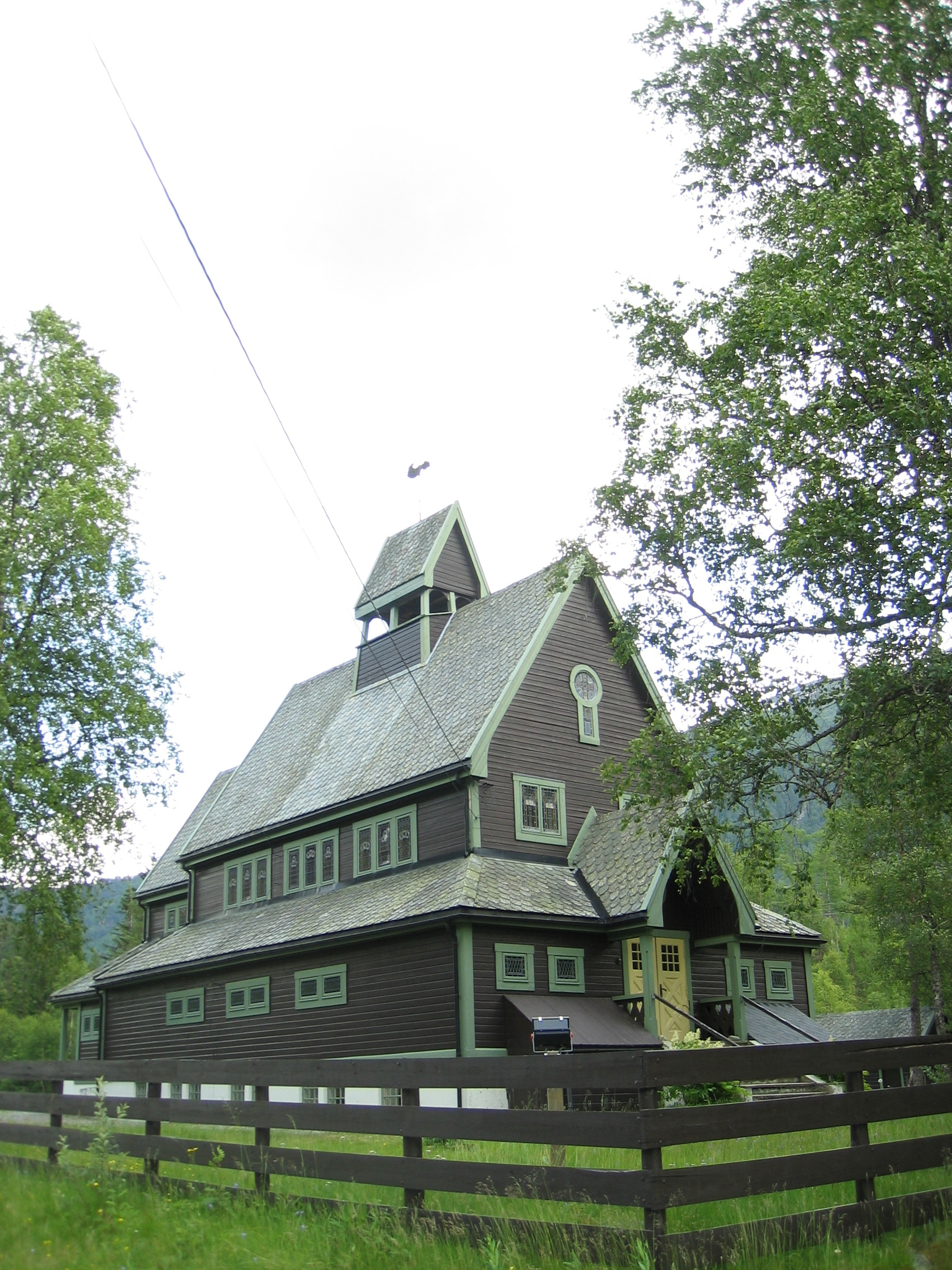
- View of the church
- Raundalen Church
- 60°40′40″N 6°37′56″E
- Location: Voss, Vestland
- Country: Norway
- Denomination: Church of Norway
- Churchmanship: Evangelical Lutheran

History
- Status: Parish church
- Founded: 1921
- Consecrated: August 1921

Architecture
- Functional status: Active
- Architect: Haldor Larsen Børve
- Architectural type: Long church
- Completed: 1921 (105 years ago)

Specifications
- Capacity: 125
- Materials: Wood

Administration
- Diocese: Bjørgvin bispedømme
- Deanery: Hardanger og Voss prosti
- Parish: Raundalen
- Norwegian Cultural Heritage Site
- Type: Church
- Status: Listed
- ID: 85277

Raundalen Church (Norwegian: Raundalen kyrkje or Raundalskyrkja) is a parish church of the Church of Norway in Voss Municipality in Vestland county, Norway. It is located in the Raundalen valley. It is the church for the Raundalen parish which is part of the Hardanger og Voss prosti (deanery) in the Diocese of Bjørgvin. The brown, wooden church was built in a long church design in 1921 using plans drawn up by the architect Haldor Børve. The church seats about 125 people.

== History ==
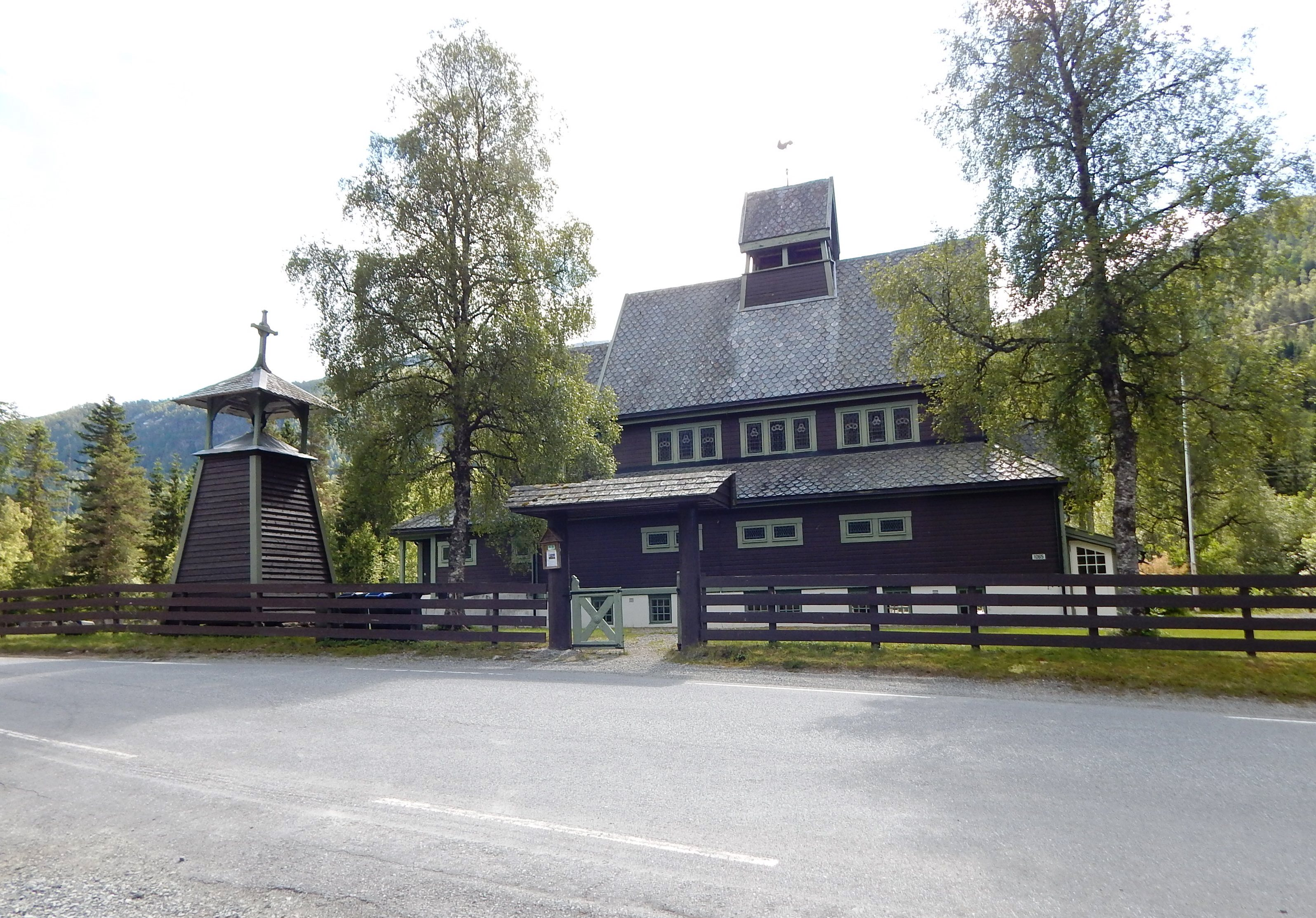
View of the church

In the old days, the road to Voss Church was long and tiring for the people of the Raundalen valley. In the early 1800s, the people began discussing the possibility of getting their own church. Eventually, a cemetery was built in the valley with the hope that some day a church would be built there as well. Around 1920, approval was given to build the church. The parish hired Haldor Børve to design the building and Johannes Dugstad and Torstein Øvsthus were hired to lead the construction. The building was designed in the National Romantic style with a modern stave church inspiration. The new church was consecrated in August 1921.

== See also ==
- List of churches in Bjørgvin
