= Etne Church =

Church in Vestland, Norway

- Etne kyrkje
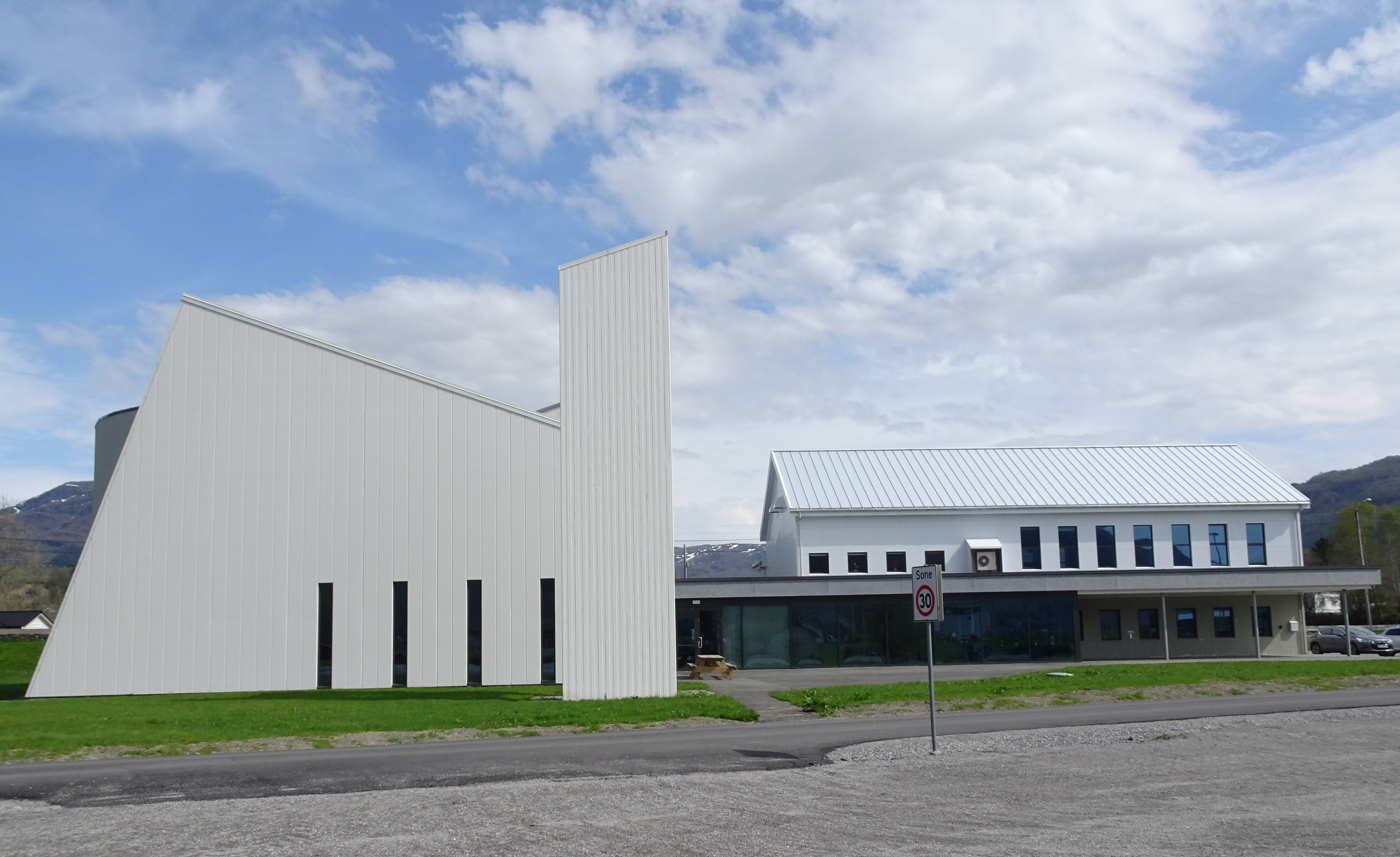
- View of the church
- Etne Church
- 59°40′11″N 5°56′40″E
- Location: Etne Municipality, Vestland
- Country: Norway
- Denomination: Church of Norway
- Churchmanship: Evangelical Lutheran

History
- Status: Parish church
- Consecrated: 1 Sept 2013

Architecture
- Functional status: Active
- Architectural type: Rectangular
- Completed: 2013 (13 years ago)

Specifications
- Capacity: 330
- Materials: Concrete

Administration
- Diocese: Bjørgvin bispedømme
- Deanery: Sunnhordland prosti
- Parish: Etne

Etne Church (Norwegian: Etne kyrkje) is a parish church of the Church of Norway in Etne Municipality in Vestland county, Norway. It is located in the village of Etne. It is one of the churches for the Etne parish which is part of the Sunnhordland prosti (deanery) in the Diocese of Bjørgvin. The white, concrete church was built in a rectangular design in 2013 using plans drawn up by the architect Arne Tveit at the architectural office Brekke Helgeland Brekke. The church seats about 330 people.

The church was consecrated on 1 September 2013. The nave is rectangular, but the choir is apsidal with one continuous, curved wall. The choir area is on a stage raised three steps above the floor of the nave. A stained glass window in the back wall serves as the altarpiece.

== See also ==
- List of churches in Bjørgvin
