= Sælen Church =

Church in Vestland, Norway

- Sælen kirke
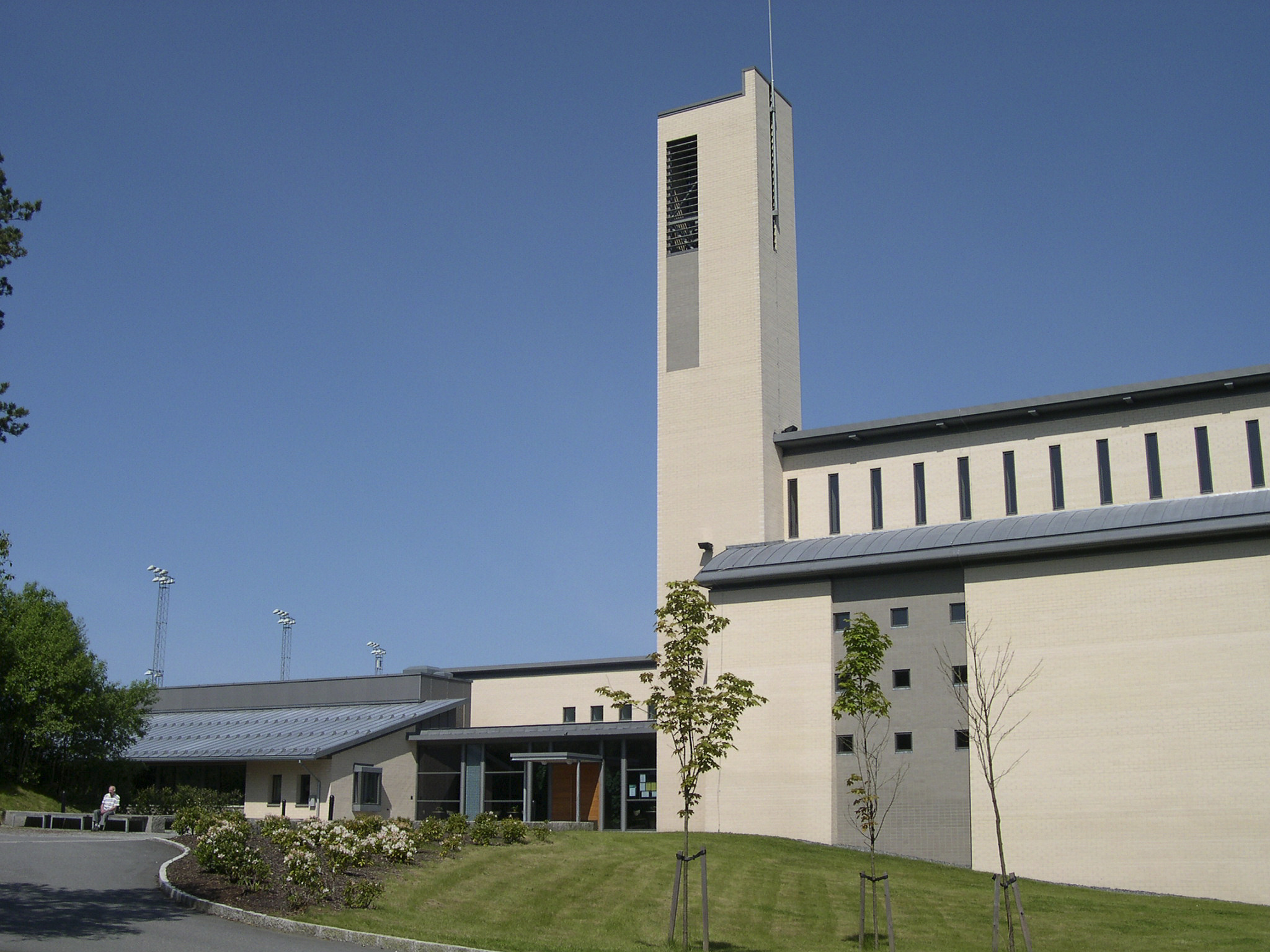
- View of the church
- Sælen Church
- 60°20′26″N 5°16′10″E
- Location: Bergen, Vestland
- Country: Norway
- Denomination: Church of Norway
- Churchmanship: Evangelical Lutheran

History
- Status: Parish church
- Founded: 2001
- Consecrated: 2 December 2001

Architecture
- Functional status: Active
- Architect: Arkitektene Lille Frøen
- Architectural type: Rectangular
- Completed: 2001 (25 years ago)

Specifications
- Capacity: 450
- Materials: Brick

Administration
- Diocese: Bjørgvin bispedømme
- Deanery: Bergensdalen prosti
- Parish: Sælen

Sælen Church (Norwegian: Sælen kirke) is a parish church of the Church of Norway in Bergen Municipality in Vestland county, Norway. It is located in the Sælen neighborhood in the city of Bergen. It is the church for the Sælen parish which is part of the Bergensdalen prosti (deanery) in the Diocese of Bjørgvin. The brown, brick church was built in a rectangular design in 2001 using plans drawn up by the architectural firm Arkitektene Lille Frøen. The church seats about 450 people.

== History ==
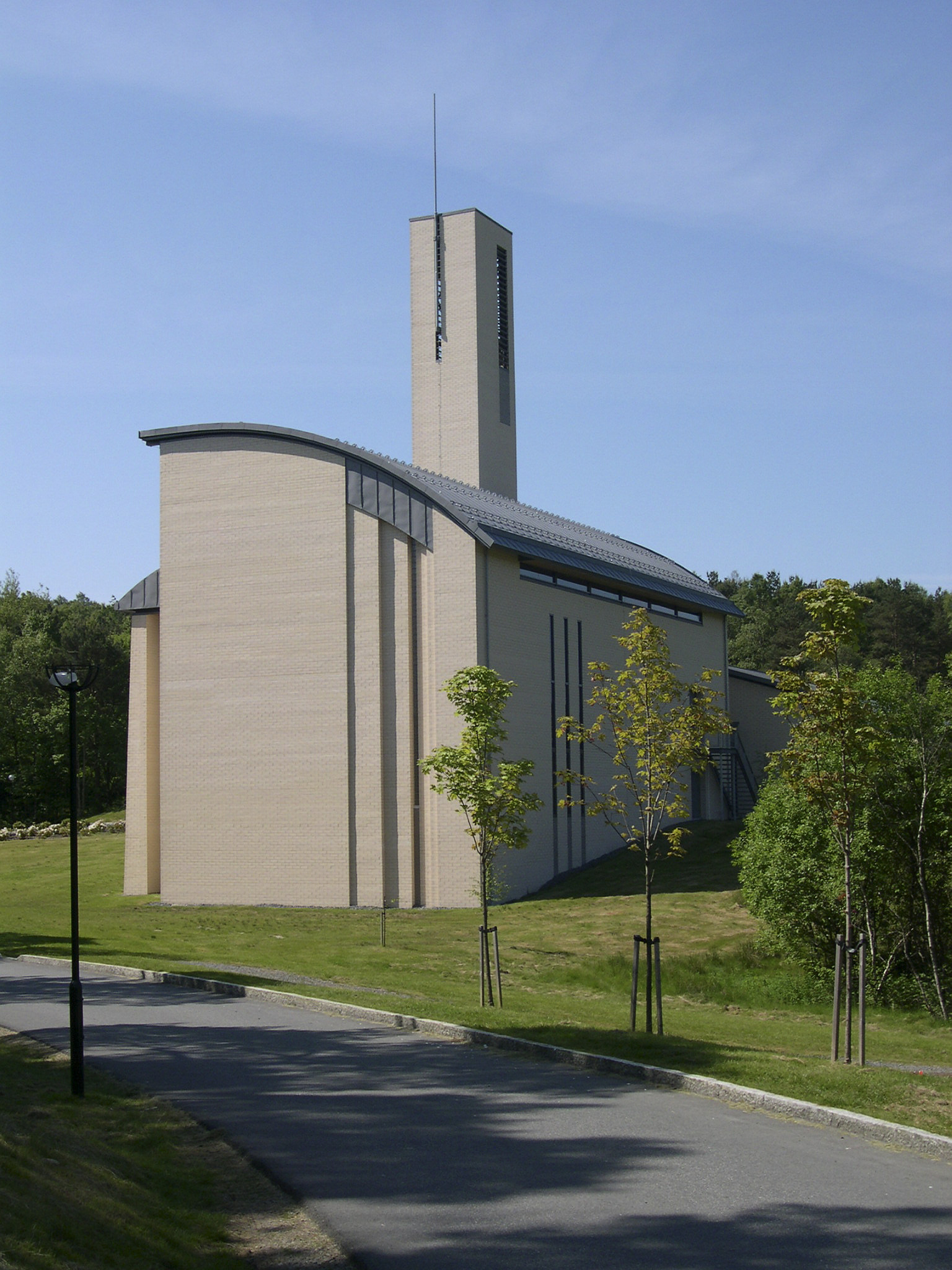
Exterior view

The parish of Sælen was established in 1982. A rented temporary church building was used for many years while funds were raised for a new church. There was a limited architectural competition in 1998 that was held to determine who would design a new church for the parish. The winning design was by Nikolai Alfsen who worked at the Arkitektene Lille Frøen. The church was consecrated on 2 December 2001.

== See also ==
- List of churches in Bjørgvin
