= List of churches in Bjørgvin =

Map of Church of Norway deaneries in Vestland county, Norway

The list of churches in Bjørgvin is a list of the Church of Norway churches in the Diocese of Bjørgvin in Norway. It includes all of the parishes in Vestland county. The Diocese is based at the Bergen Cathedral in the city of Bergen in Bergen Municipality.

The list is divided into several sections, one for each deanery (prosti; headed by a provost) in the diocese. Administratively within each deanery, the churches within each municipality elects their own church council (fellesråd). Each municipality may have one or more parishes (sokn) within the municipality. Each parish elects their own councils (soknerådet). Each parish has one or more local church.

The number and size of the deaneries and parishes has changed over time. The Laksevåg prosti (created in 1990) in Bergen was dissolved in 2013 and its churches were divided between the Bergen domprosti and the Fana prosti. Also in 2013, the old Ytre Sogn prosti was dissolved. The old deanery included Gulen, Solund, Hyllestad, Høyanger, Balestrand, and Vik municipalities. The municipalities of Gulen and Solund were transferred to the Nordhordland prosti, which includes the northern municipalities in the old Hordaland county. Hyllestad and Høyanger municipalities were transferred to Sunnfjord prosti, and Balestrand and Vik municipalities were merged with the old Indre Sogn prosti and it was renamed Sogn prosti.

In 2014, the Midhordland prosti was dissolved and its churches were divided between Fana prosti and Hardanger og Voss prosti. Also in 2014, the parishes in nearby Osterøy Municipality were transferred from Nordhordland prosti to the Arna og Åsane prosti. At that time, its name could have been changed to "Arna, Åsane and Osterøy deanery" but that was considered to be too long a name. In 2015, the Norwegian Department of Culture changed the name to Åsane prosti.

In 2017, the diocese created a new deanery called Bergensdalen prosti to help relieve the work in the large deaneries in the city of Bergen.

== Bergen domprosti ==
This arch-deanery (Norwegian: domprosti) covers the central part of the city of Bergen. The deanery is headquartered at the Bergen Cathedral in the city of Bergen in Bergen Municipality.

The Bergen domprosti has been in operation for a long time. In 1990, the large Bergen domprosti was split into four deaneries: Arna og Åsane prosti in the northeast, Fana prosti in the south part of the city, Laksevåg prosti in the west part of the city, and Bergen domprosti in the city centre. In 2013, the old Laksevåg prosti was dissolved and the parishes of Laksevåg, Nygård, Loddefjord, and Olsvik were moved back into this deanery (the remainder of the old Laksevåg prosti became part of Fana prosti).

Municipality	Parish (sokn)	Church	Location	Year built	Photo
Bergen	Bergen domkirke	Bergen Cathedral	Bergen	begun ca. 1250	
Bergen	Bergen domkirke	Church of the Cross	Bergen	late 12th century	
Bergen	Bergen domkirke	St. Jacob's Church	Nygård	1921	
Bergen	Bergen domkirke	St. George's Hospital Church	Bergen	1702	
Bergen	Bergen domkirke	St. John's Church	Sydnes	1894	
Bergen	Bergen domkirke	St. Maria's Church	Bergenhus	after 1140	
Bergen	Bergen domkirke	New Church	Nordnes	1763	
Bergen	Laksevåg	Laksevåg Church	Laksevåg	1875	
Bergen	Loddefjord	Loddefjord Church	Loddefjord	1926	
Bergen	Nygård	Nygård Church	Gravdal	1972	
Bergen	Olsvik	Olsvik Church	Olsvik	1990	
Bergen	Sandviken	Sandvik Church	Sandviken	1881	

== Nordfjord prosti ==
This deanery (Norwegian: prosti) covers several municipalities in northern part of the diocese. It includes the parishes in the municipalities of Bremanger, Gloppen, Stad, Stryn, and the northern portion of Kinn. The deanery is headquartered at Eid Church in the village of Nordfjordeid in Stad Municipality.

The deanery has been in use since the Reformation in Norway. On 1 January 2020, the parish of Hornindal Municipality was transferred to the Søre Sunnmøre prosti in the Diocese of Møre after Hornindal became a part of Volda Municipality.

Municipality	Parish (sokn)	Church	Location	Year built	Photo
Bremanger	Berle	Berle Church	Berle	1977	
Bremanger	Bremanger	Bremanger Church	Bremanger	1914	
Bremanger	Davik	Davik Church	Davik	1886	
Bremanger	Frøya	Frøya Church	Kalvåg	1865	
Bremanger	Midtgulen	Midtgulen Church	Midtgulen	1904	
Bremanger	Midtgulen	Svelgen Chapel	Svelgen	1960	
Bremanger	Rugsund	Rugsund Church	Rugsund	1838	
Bremanger	Ålfoten	Ålfoten Church	Ålfoten	1678	
Gloppen	Breim	Breim Church	Re	1886	
Gloppen	Gloppen	Gimmestad Church	Gimmestad	1910	
Gloppen	Gloppen	Old Gimmestad Church	Gimmestad	1692	
Gloppen	Gloppen	Sandane Church	Sandane	1997	
Gloppen	Gloppen	Vereide Church	Vereide	1200	
Gloppen	Hyen	Hyen Church	Hyen	1876	
Kinn	Nord-Vågsøy	Nord-Vågsøy Church	Raudeberg	1960	
Kinn	Sør-Vågsøy	Sør-Vågsøy Church	Måløy	1907	
Kinn	*Note: There are more churches in Kinn Municipality that are part of the Sunnfjord prosti.				
Stad	Eid	Eid Church	Nordfjordeid	1849	
Stad	Eid	Heggjabygda Church	Heggjabygda	1936	
Stad	Ervik	Ervik Church	Ervik	1970	
Stad	Kjølsdalen	Kjølsdalen Church	Kjølsdalen	1940	
Stad	Leikanger	Leikanger Church	Leikanger	1866	
Stad	Selje	Selje Church	Selje	1866	
Stad	Stårheim	Stårheim Church	Stårheim	1864	
Stad	Totland	Totland Church	Totland	1912	
Stryn	Innvik	Innvik Church	Innvik	1822	
Stryn	Loen	Loen Church	Loen	1837	
Stryn	Nordsida	Nordsida Church	Roset	1973	
Stryn	Nedstryn	Nedstryn Church	Nedstryn	1859	
Stryn	Olden	Olden Church	Olden	1934	
Stryn	Olden	Old Olden Church	Olden	1759	
Stryn	Olden	Ljosheim Chapel	Mykløy in Oldedalen	1924	
Stryn	Oppstryn	Oppstryn Church	Oppstryn	1863	
Stryn	Randabygd	Randabygd Church	Randabygda	1916	
Stryn	Utvik	Utvik Church	Utvik	1840	

== Sunnfjord prosti ==
This deanery (Norwegian: prosti) covers several municipalities in the north-central part of the diocese. It includes the parishes in the municipalities of Askvoll, Fjaler, Hyllestad, Høyanger, Sunnfjord, and the southern part of Kinn. The deanery is headquartered at Førde Church in the town of Førde in Sunnfjord Municipality.

The deanery has been in use since the Reformation in Norway. A royal resolution on 19 May 1922 changed the deanery name from "Søndfjord prosti" to "Sunnfjord prosti". In 2013, the Ytre Sogn prosti was dissolved and the parishes in Hyllestad Municipality and Høyanger Municipality were transferred to this deanery.

Municipality	Parish (sokn)	Church	Location	Year built	Photo
Askvoll	Askvoll	Askvoll Church	Askvoll	1863	
Askvoll	Askvoll	Bulandet Chapel	Kjempeneset in Bulandet	1905	
Askvoll	Askvoll	Holmedal Church	Holmedal	1868	
Askvoll	Askvoll	Kvammen Chapel	Kvammen	1977	
Askvoll	Askvoll	Stongfjorden Chapel	Stongfjorden	1908	
Askvoll	Askvoll	Vilnes Church	Vilnes on Atløyna	1674	
Askvoll	Askvoll	Værlandet Chapel	Værøy in Værlandet	1960	
Fjaler	Fjaler	Dale Church	Dale	1864	
Fjaler	Fjaler	Folkestad Chapel	Våge	1913	
Fjaler	Fjaler	Guddal Church	Guddal	1686	
Fjaler	Fjaler	Hellevik Chapel	Hellevika	1978	
Kinn	Bru	Askrova Chapel	Askrova	1957	
Kinn	Bru	Stavang Church	Stavang	1957	
Kinn	Eikefjord	Eikefjord Church	Eikefjord	1812	
Kinn	Kinn	Batalden Chapel	Fanøya	1907	
Kinn	Kinn	Florø Church	Florø	1882	
Kinn	Kinn	Kinn Church	Kinn	12th century	
Kinn	Nordal	Nordal Church	Norddalsfjord	1898	
Kinn	*Note: There are more churches in Kinn Municipality that are part of the Nordfjord prosti.				
Hyllestad	Hyllestad	Bø Church	Bø	1868	
Hyllestad	Hyllestad	Hyllestad Church	Hyllestad	1879	
Hyllestad	Hyllestad	Øn Church	Sørbøvågen	1958	
Høyanger	Bjordal og Ortnevik	Bjordal Church	Bjordal	1906	
Høyanger	Bjordal og Ortnevik	Ortnevik Church	Ortnevik	1925	
Høyanger	Høyanger	Høyanger Church	Høyanger	1960	
Høyanger	Kyrkjebø	Kyrkjebø Church	Kyrkjebø	1869	
Høyanger	Kyrkjebø	Vadheim Chapel	Vadheim	1916	
Høyanger	Lavik	Lavik Church	Lavik	1865	
Sunnfjord	Førde	Førde Church	Førde	1885	
Sunnfjord	Gaular	Bygstad Church	Bygstad	1845	
Sunnfjord	Gaular	Hestad Chapel	Hestad	1805	
Sunnfjord	Gaular	Sande Church	Sande	1864	
Sunnfjord	Gaular	Viksdalen Church	Vik	1848	
Sunnfjord	Helgheim	Helgheim Church	Helgheim	1877	
Sunnfjord	Holsen og Haukedalen	Holsen Church	Holsen	1861	
Sunnfjord	Holsen og Haukedalen	Haukedalen Church	Haukedalen	1885	
Sunnfjord	Naustdal	Naustdal Church	Naustdal	1891	
Sunnfjord	Vevring	Vevring Church	Indrevevring	1846	
Sunnfjord	Ålhus	Vassenden Church	Vassenden	2002	
Sunnfjord	Ålhus	Ålhus Church	Ålhus	1795	

== Sogn prosti ==
This deanery (Norwegian: prosti) covers several municipalities in east-central part of the county. It includes the parishes in the municipalities of Aurland, Luster, Lærdal, Sogndal, Vik, and Årdal. The deanery is headquartered at Stedje Church in the village of Sogndalsfjøra in Sogndal Municipality.

The old Sogn prosti was divided in 1819 into Ytre Sogn prosti (outer Sogn) and Indre Sogn prosti (inner Sogn). Indre Sogn prosti was based at Stedje Church and the Ytre Sogn prosti was based at Lavik Church in Høyanger Municipality. In 2013, the old Ytre Sogn prosti was dissolved and the parishes in Balestrand Municipality and Vik Municipality were transferred to this deanery. At the same time, this deanery's name was changed from Indre Sogn prosti to simply Sogn prosti. The rest of the old Ytre Sogn prosti was divided between Sunnfjord prosti (Hyllestad and Høyanger) and Nordhordland prosti (Gulen and Solund).

Municipality	Parish (sokn)	Church	Location	Year built	Photo
Aurland	Flåm	Flåm Church	Flåm	1670	
Aurland	Nærøy	Bakka Church	Bakka	1859	
Aurland	Undredal	Undredal Stave Church	Undredal	1147	
Aurland	Vangen	Vangen Church	Aurlandsvangen	1280	
Luster	Dale	Dale Church	Luster	1240	
Luster	Fet og Joranger	Fet Church	Fet	1894	
Luster	Fet og Joranger	Joranger Church	Joranger	1660	
Luster	Fortun	Fortun Church	Fortun	1879	
Luster	Gaupne	Gaupne Church	Gaupne	1907	
Luster	Gaupne	Old Gaupne Church	Gaupne	1647	
Luster	Hafslo	Hafslo Church	Hafslo	1878	
Luster	Hafslo	Veitastrond Chapel	Veitastrond	1928	
Luster	Jostedal	Jostedal Church	Jostedal	1660	
Luster	Nes	Nes Church	Nes	1836	
Luster	Solvorn	Solvorn Church	Solvorn	1883	
Luster	Solvorn	Urnes Stave Church	Ornes	1130	
Lærdal	Borgund	Borgund Church	Borgund	1868	
Lærdal	Borgund	Borgund Stave Church	Borgund	1150	
Lærdal	Hauge	Hauge Church	Lærdalsøyri	1869	
Lærdal	Tønjum	Tønjum Church	Tønjum	1832	
Sogndal	Balestrand	Kvamsøy Church	Kvamsøy	1300	
Sogndal	Balestrand	Sæle Church	Sæle	1903	
Sogndal	Balestrand	Tjugum Church	Tjugum	1863	
Sogndal	Fjærland	Fjærland Church	Fjærland	1861	
Sogndal	Kaupanger	Kaupanger Stave Church	Kaupanger	1140	
Sogndal	Leikanger	Leikanger Church	Leikanger	1166	
Sogndal	Norum	Ølmheim Church	Nornes	1863	
Sogndal	Stedje	Stedje Church	Sogndalsfjøra	1867	
Vik	Arnafjord	Arnafjord Church	Arnafjord	1645	
Vik	Feios	Feios Church	Feios	1866	
Vik	Fresvik	Fresvik Church	Fresvik	1881	
Vik	Vangsnes	Vangsnes Church	Vangsnes	1861	
Vik	Vik	Vik Church	Vikøyri	1877	
Vik	Vik	Hove Church	Vikøyri	c. 1170	
Vik	Vik	Hopperstad Stave Church	Vikøyri	c. 1130	
Årdal	Nedre Årdal	Årdal Church	Årdalstangen	1867	
Årdal	Øvre Årdal	Farnes Church	Øvre Årdal	1970	

== Nordhordland prosti ==
This deanery (Norwegian: prosti) covers several municipalities in west-central part of the county. It includes the parishes in the municipalities of Alver, Austrheim, Fedje, Gulen, Masfjorden, Modalen, and Solund. The deanery is headquartered at Alversund Church in the village of Isdalstø in Alver Municipality.

The deanery has been in existence for a long time. In 2013, the old Ytre Sogn prosti was dissolved and the parishes in Gulen Municipality and Solund Municipality (from the old Sogn og Fjordane county) were moved into this deanery. In 2014, the parishes in Osterøy Municipality were transferred from this deanery from the neighboring Arna og Åsane prosti.

Municipality	Parish (sokn)	Church	Location	Year built	Photo
Alver	Knarvik	Alversund Church	Alversund	1879	
Alver	Knarvik	Knarvik Church	Knarvik	2014	
Alver	Knarvik	Lygra Church	Luro	1892	
Alver	Knarvik	Seim Church	Seim	1878	
Alver	Lindås	Hundvin Church	Hundvin	1936	
Alver	Lindås	Lindås Church	Lindås	1865	
Alver	Lindås	Myking Church	Myking	1861	
Alver	Meland	Meland Church	Meland	1866	
Alver	Osterfjorden	Ostereidet Church	Ostereidet	1988	
Alver	Osterfjorden	Vike Church	Vike	1891	
Alver	Radøy	Hordabø Church	Bøvågen	1875	
Alver	Radøy	Manger Church	Manger	1891	
Alver	Radøy	Sæbø Church	Sæbø	1883	
Alver	Radøy	Emigrant Church, Sletta	Sletta	1997	
Austrheim	Austrheim	Austrheim Church	Austrheim	1865	
Fedje	Fedje	Fedje Church	Fedje	1941	
Gulen	Brekke	Brekke Church	Brekke	1862	
Gulen	Gulen	Gulen Church	Eivindvik	1863	
Gulen	Mjømna	Mjømna Church	Mjømna	1901	
Masfjorden	Masfjorden	Frøyset Church	Frøyset	1937	
Masfjorden	Masfjorden	Sandnes Church	Masfjordnes	1845	
Masfjorden	Masfjorden	Solheim Church	Solheim	1881	
Modalen	Modalen	Mo Church	Mo	1883	
Solund	Solund	Hersvik Church	Hersvikbygda	1892	
Solund	Solund	Husøy Church	Kolgrov	1896	
Solund	Solund	Solund Church	Hardbakke	1869	

== Åsane prosti ==
This deanery (Norwegian: prosti) covers the northern/eastern part of the city of Bergen and the neighboring Osterøy Municipality in the central part the county. The deanery is headquartered at Åsane Church in the borough of Åsane in Bergen Municipality.

This deanery was created in 1990 when the large Bergen domprosti was divided. Originally, this deanery was named Arna og Åsane prosti. In 2014, the churches from Osterøy Municipality were transferred to this deanery from Nordhordland prosti. After that, the name of the deanery was shortend to simply Åsane prosti.

Municipality	Parish (sokn)	Church	Location	Year built	Photo
Bergen	Arna	Arna Church	Indre Arna	1865	
Bergen	Arna	Takvam Chapel	Takvam	1912	
Bergen	Biskopshavn	Biskopshavn Church	Biskopshavn	1966	
Bergen	Eidsvåg	Eidsvåg Church	Eidsvåg	1982	
Bergen	Salhus	Salhus Church	Salhus	1924	
Bergen	Ytre Arna	Ytre Arna Church	Ytre Arna	1899	
Bergen	Åsane	Åsane Church	Åsane	1993	
Bergen	Åsane	Old Åsane Church	Åsane	1795	
Osterøy	Bruvik	Bruvik Church	Bruvik	1867	
Osterøy	Gjerstad	Gjerstad Church	Gjerstad	1870	
Osterøy	Hamre	Hamre Church	Hamre	1622	
Osterøy	Haus	Haus Church	Hausvik	1874	
Osterøy	Hosanger	Hosanger Church	Hosanger	1796	

== Bergensdalen prosti ==
This deanery (Norwegian: prosti) covers the south-central part of the city of Bergen. The deanery is headquartered at Storetveit Church in the Fjøsanger area of Bergen Municipality.

This deanery was created on 1 October 2017 when parts of the Bergen domprosti and Fana prosti were split off to create this new deanery.

Municipality	Parish (sokn)	Church	Location	Year built	Photo
Bergen	Bønes	Bønes Church	Bønestoppen	2009	
Bergen	Fridalen	Fridalen Church	Minde	1985	
Bergen	Fyllingsdalen	Fyllingsdalen Church	Fyllingsdalen	1976	
Bergen	Landås	Landås Church	Landås	1966	
Bergen	Løvstakksiden	St. Marcus Church	Løvstakksiden	1939	
Bergen	Løvstakksiden	Solheim Church	Solheimsviken	1956	
Bergen	Slettebakken	Slettebakken Church	Slettebakken	1970	
Bergen	Storetveit	Storetveit Church	Fjøsanger	1930	
Bergen	Sælen	Sælen Church	Sælen	2001	
Bergen	Årstad	Årstad Church	Årstad	1890	

== Fana prosti ==
This deanery (Norwegian: prosti) covers the southern part of the city of Bergen and the neighboring Bjørnafjorden Municipality and Austevoll Municipality in the west-central part of the county. The deanery is headquartered at Fana Church in the borough of Fana in Bergen Municipality.

The deanery was established in 1990 when it was split off from the old Midhordland prosti. In 2013, the old Laksevåg prosti was split up and the Fyllingsdalen and Sælen parishes were transferred to Fana prosti. In 2014, the old Midhordland prosti was dissolved and split up. The parishes in the municipalities of Os Municipality and Austevoll were transferred to Fana prosti. In 2017, the churches from Fusa Municipality were transferred to this deanery from the neighboring Hardanger og Voss prosti in preparation for the merger of Os and Fusa to form Bjørnafjorden Municipality on 1 January 2020.

Municipality	Parish (sokn)	Church	Location	Year built	Photo
Austevoll	Austevoll	Austevoll Church	Storebø	1890	
Austevoll	Austevoll	Bekkjarvik Church	Bekkjarvik	1895	
Austevoll	Austevoll	Hundvåkøy Chapel	Austevollhella	1990	
Austevoll	Austevoll	Møkster Church	Kvalvåg on Stolmen	1892	
Austevoll	Austevoll	Store-Kalsøy Chapel	Bakkasund	1975	
Bergen	Birkeland	Birkeland Church	Nesttun	1878	
Bergen	Fana	Fana Church	Fanahammeren	1150	
Bergen	Fana	Ytrebygda Church	Blomsterdalen	2011	
Bergen	Skjold	Skjold Church	Skjold	1998	
Bergen	Søreide	Søreide Church	Søreidegrenda	1973	
Bjørnafjorden	Fusa	Fusa Church	Fusa	1961	
Bjørnafjorden	Fusa	Holdhus Church	Holdhus	1726	
Bjørnafjorden	Fusa	Hålandsdal Church	Eide	1890	
Bjørnafjorden	Fusa	Strandvik Church	Strandvik	1857	
Bjørnafjorden	Fusa	Sundvor Church	Sundvord	1927	
Bjørnafjorden	Os	Os Church	Osøyro	1870	
Bjørnafjorden	Os	Nore Neset Church	Hagavik	2000	

== Hardanger og Voss prosti ==
This deanery (Norwegian: prosti) covers several municipalities in the southeastern part of the diocese. The deanery is headquartered at Voss Church in the village of Vossevangen in Voss Municipality.

This deanery was established in 1819 when the parishes in Voss were moved into the old Hardanger prosti, creating the Hardanger og Voss prosti. On 1 March 2014, the parishes in Fusa Municipality and Samnanger Municipality were moved to this deanery when the old Midhordland prosti was dissolved. On 1 October 2017, the parishes in Fusa Municipality were transferred from this deanery to the neighboring Fana prosti.

Municipality	Parish (sokn)	Church	Location	Year built	Photo
Eidfjord	Eidfjord	Eidfjord Church	Eidfjord	1981	
Eidfjord	Eidfjord	Old Eidfjord Church	Eidfjord	1309	
Kvam	Strandebarm	Strandebarm Church	Bru	1876	
Kvam	Vikøy	Norheimsund Church	Norheimsund	1992	
Kvam	Vikøy	Vikøy Church	Vikøy	1838	
Kvam	Øystese	Øystese Church	Øystese	1868	
Kvam	Ålvik	Ålvik Church	Ålvik	1962	
Samnanger	Samnanger	Haga Church	Haga	1995	
Samnanger	Samnanger	Samnanger Church	Årland	1851	
Ullensvang	Jondal	Jondal Church	Jondal	1888	
Ullensvang	Kinsarvik	Kinsarvik Church	Kinsarvik	1150	
Ullensvang	Odda	Odda Church	Odda	1870	
Ullensvang	Røldal	Røldal Stave Church	Røldal	1250	
Ullensvang	Skare	Skare Church	Skare	1926	
Ullensvang	Tyssedal	Tyssedal Church	Tyssedal	1965	
Ullensvang	Ullensvang	Ullensvang Church	Lofthus	1250	
Ullensvang	Utne	Utne Church	Utne	1895	
Ulvik	Ulvik	Ulvik Church	Ulvik	1859	
Vaksdal	Bergsdalen	Bergsdalen Church	Bergsdalen	1955	
Vaksdal	Dale	Dale Church	Dale	1956	
Vaksdal	Eksingedalen	Eksingedal Church	Flatkvål	1883	
Vaksdal	Nesheim	Nesheim Church	Nesheim	1908	
Vaksdal	Stamnes	Stamnes Church	Stamneshella	1861	
Vaksdal	Vaksdal	Vaksdal Church	Vaksdal	1933	
Voss	Evanger og Bolstad	Evanger Church	Evanger	1851	
Voss	Granvin	Granvin Church	Granvin	1726	
Voss	Oppheim	Oppheim Church	Oppheim	1871	
Voss	Raundalen	Raundalen Church	Raundalen	1921	
Voss	Vinje	Vinje Church	Vinje	1871	
Voss	Voss	Voss Church	Vossevangen	1277	

== Vesthordland prosti ==
This deanery (Norwegian: prosti) covers the two island municipalities of Askøy and Øygarden in the west-central part of the diocese. The deanery is headquartered at Fjell Church in the village of Straume in Øygarden Municipality.

Vesthordland prosti was established on 15 October 1999 when the large Midhordland prosti was divided by removing the western island region and making it a new deanery. The new Vesthordland prosti received the parishes of Askøy, Fjell, Sund, and Øygarden. The parishes in Austevoll, Os, Fusa, Kvam, and Samnanger remained in Midhordland prosti.

Municipality	Parish (sokn)	Church	Location	Year built	Photo
Askøy	Ask	Ask Church	Ask	1908	
Askøy	Erdal	Erdal Church	Erdal	2006	
Askøy	Herdla	Herdla Church	Herdla	1863	
Askøy	Strusshamn	Strusshamn Church	Strusshamn	1969	
Askøy	Tveit	Tveit Church	Tveitevåg	1957	
Øygarden	Fjell	Fjell Church	Fjell	1874	
Øygarden	Fjell	Foldnes Church	Foldnes	2001	
Øygarden	Fjell	Landro Church	Landro	1977	
Øygarden	Hjelme og Blomvåg	Blomvåg Church	Blomvåg	1931	
Øygarden	Hjelme og Blomvåg	Hjelme Church	Seløyna	1971	
Øygarden	Hjelme og Blomvåg	Old Hjelme Church	Seløyna	1875	
Øygarden	Sund	Kausland Church	Kausland	1881	
Øygarden	Sund	Sund Church	Klokkarvik	1997	

== Sunnhordland prosti ==
This deanery (Norwegian: prosti) covers several municipalities in the southwestern part of the diocese. It includes the parishes in the municipalities of Bømlo, Etne, Fitjar, Kvinnherad, Stord, Sveio, and Tysnes. The deanery is headquartered at Stord Church in the town of Leirvik in Stord Municipality.

The original Søndhordland prosti was established in medieval times. Sometime after the Reformation in Norway, the parish was divided into Nordre Søndhordland prosti (the modern municipalities of Kvinnherad, Stord, Fitjar, and Tysnes) and Søndre Søndhordland prosti (the modern municipalities of Etne, Sveio, and Bømlo). A royal resolution on 19 May 1922 changed the deanery names from "Nordre Søndhordland prosti" to "Nordre Sunnhordland prosti" and "Søndre Søndhordland prosti" to "Sør-Sunnhordland prosti". On 1 January 1972, the present Sunnhordland prosti was established when the old Nordre Sunnhordland prosti and Sør-Sunnhordland prosti were merged.

Municipality	Parish (sokn)	Church	Location	Year built	Photo
Bømlo	Bremnes	Bremnes Church	Svortland	1869	
Bømlo	Bømlo	Bømlo Church	Langevåg	1960	
Bømlo	Bømlo	Old Bømlo Church	Langevåg	1621	
Bømlo	Lykling	Lykling Church	Lykling	1912	
Bømlo	Moster	Moster Church	Mosterhamn	1874	
Bømlo	Moster	Old Moster Church	Moster	1100	
Etne	Etne	Etne Church	Etnesjøen	2013	
Etne	Etne	Gjerde Church	Etnesjøen	1676	
Etne	Etne	Grindheim Church	Etnesjøen	1728	
Etne	Etne	Stødle Church	Etnesjøen	1160	
Etne	Skånevik	Skånevik Church	Skånevik	1900	
Etne	Skånevik	Fjæra Chapel	Fjæra	1913	
Fitjar	Fitjar	Fitjar Church	Fitjar	1867	
Kvinnherad	Fjelberg og Eid	Eid Church	Eidsvik	1824	
Kvinnherad	Fjelberg og Eid	Fjelberg Church	Fjelbergøya	1722	
Kvinnherad	Hatlestrand	Hatlestrand Church	Hatlestrand	1885	
Kvinnherad	Husnes og Holmedal	Holmedal Church	Utåker	1815	
Kvinnherad	Husnes og Holmedal	Husnes Church	Husnes	1874	
Kvinnherad	Husnes og Holmedal	Valen Church	Valen	1978	
Kvinnherad	Kvinnherad	Kvinnherad Church	Rosendal	1255	
Kvinnherad	Uskedalen	Uskedalen Church	Uskedal	1914	
Kvinnherad	Varaldsøy	Varaldsøy Church	Varaldsøy	1885	
Kvinnherad	Ænes	Ænes Church	Ænes	1200	
Kvinnherad	Ølve	Ølve Church	Ølve	1861	
Kvinnherad	Åkra	Åkra Church	Åkra	1735	
Stord	Nysæter	Nysæter Church	Sagvåg	1991	
Stord	Stord	Stord Church	Leirvik	1857	
Sveio	Sveio	Sveio Church	Sveio	1858	
Sveio	Valestrand og Førde	Førde Church	Førde	1938	
Sveio	Valestrand og Førde	Valestrand Church	Valestrand	1873	
Sveio	Valestrand og Førde	Valen Chapel	Valevåg	1707	
Tysnes	Onarheim	Onarheim Church	Onarheim	1893	
Tysnes	Reksteren og Uggdal	Reksteren Church	Reksteren	1937	
Tysnes	Reksteren og Uggdal	Uggdal Church	Uggdal	1876	
Tysnes	Tysnes	Tysnes Church	Våge	1868	
