= Søreide Church =

Church in Vestland, Norway

- Søreide kirke
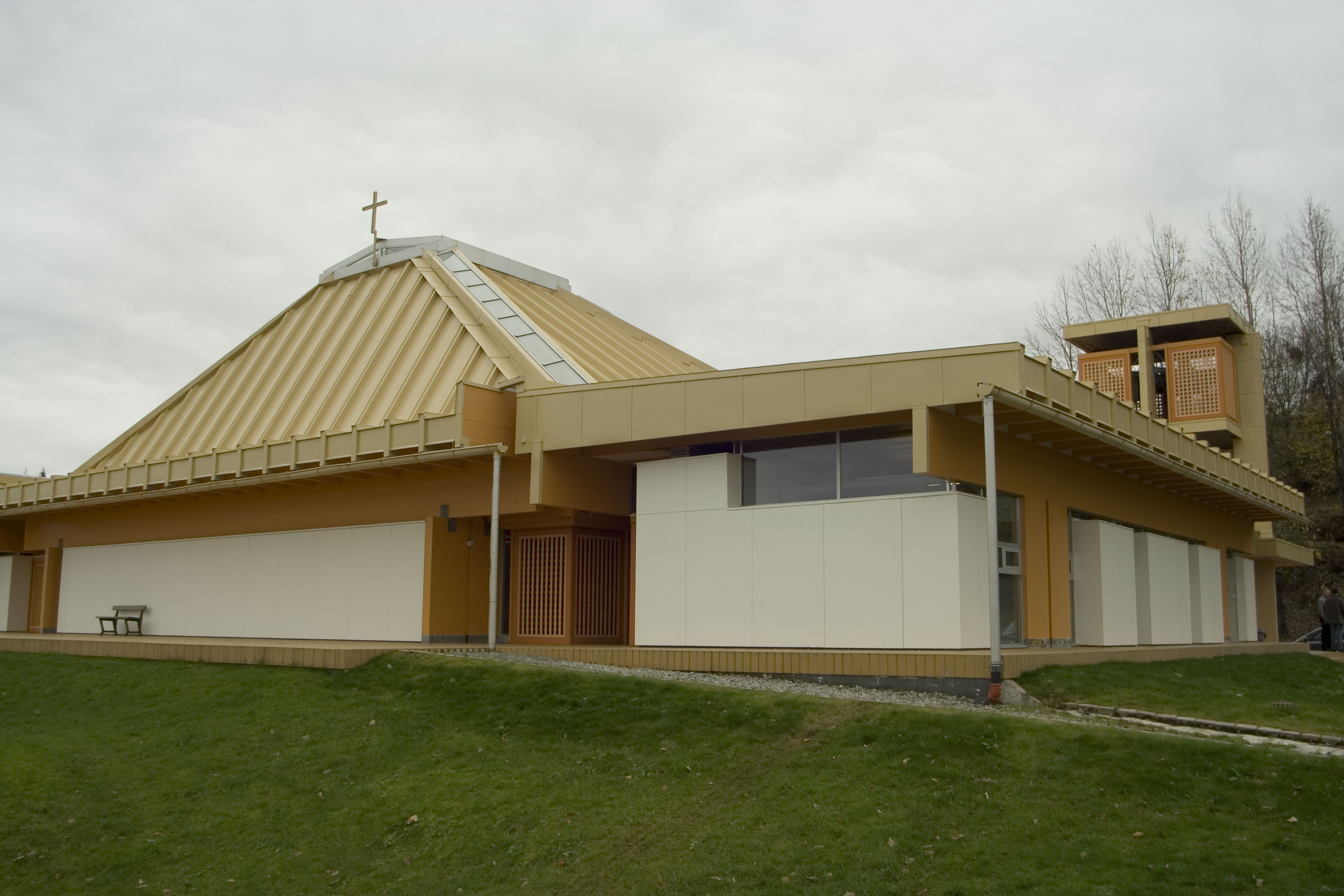
- View of the church
- Søreide Church
- 60°18′54″N 5°16′24″E
- Location: Bergen Municipality, Vestland
- Country: Norway
- Denomination: Church of Norway
- Churchmanship: Evangelical Lutheran

History
- Status: Parish church
- Founded: 1973
- Consecrated: 16 Dec 1973

Architecture
- Functional status: Active
- Architect: Helge Hjertholm
- Architectural type: Fan-shaped
- Groundbreaking: 25 October 1972
- Completed: 1973 (53 years ago)

Specifications
- Capacity: 300
- Materials: Wood

Administration
- Diocese: Bjørgvin bispedømme
- Deanery: Fana prosti
- Parish: Søreide
- Norwegian Cultural Heritage Site
- Type: Church
- Status: Listed by municipality
- ID: 249255

Søreide Church (Norwegian: Søreide kirke) is a parish church of the Church of Norway in Bergen Municipality in Vestland county, Norway. It is located in the Søreidegrenda neighborhood in the city of Bergen. It is the church for the Søreide parish which is part of the Fana prosti (deanery) in the Diocese of Bjørgvin. The white, wooden church was built in a fan-shaped style in 1973 using designs by the architect Helge Hjertholm. The church seats about 300 people, although by moving some folding walls, it can expand to fit an additional 300 people.

== History ==
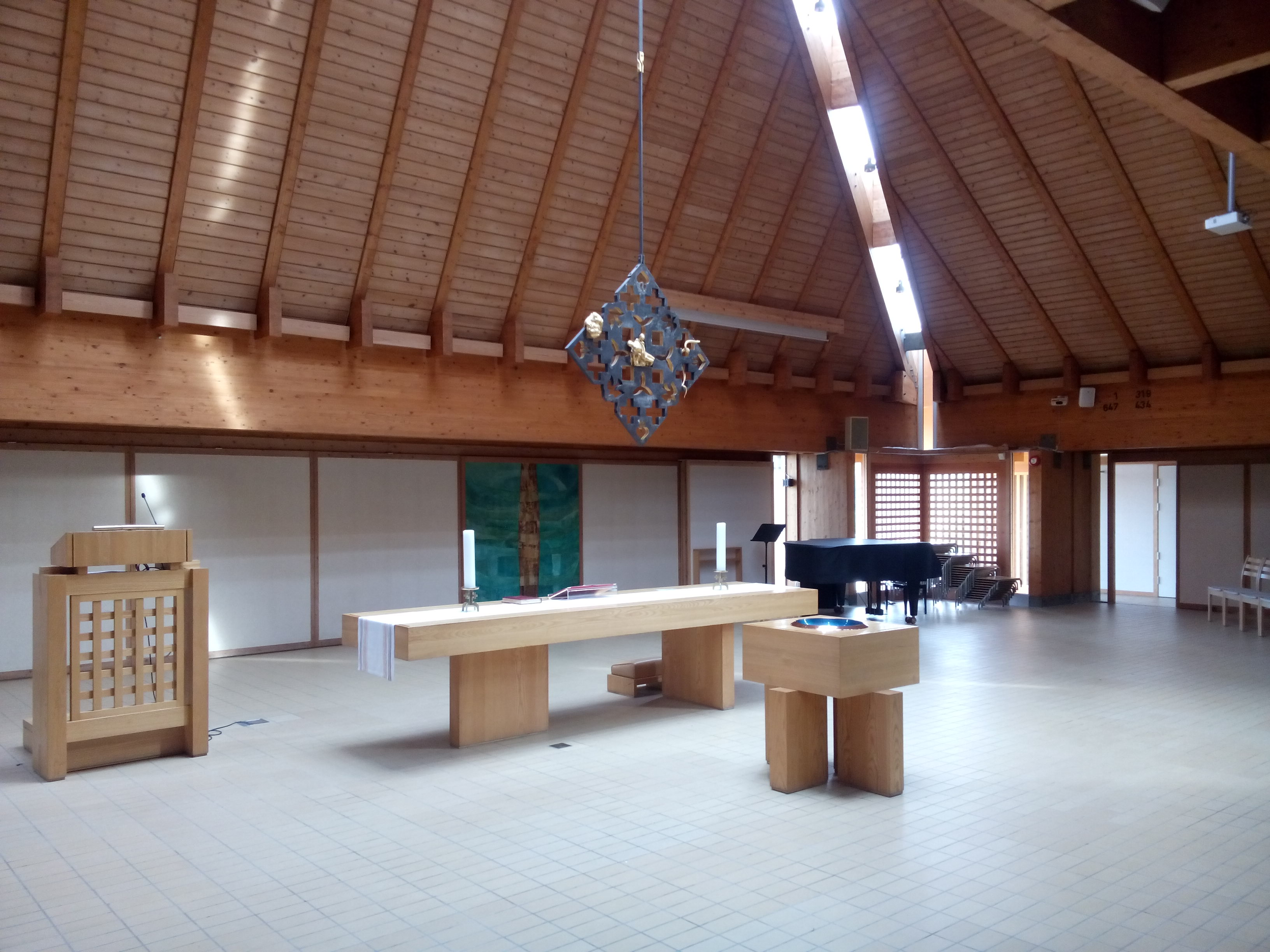
Interior view

Approval for building a new church in Søreide was granted in 1968. The parish hired the architect Helge Hjertholm and his employees Jostein Lynghjem and Per Oeding to design the church. The foundation stone was laid on 25 October 1972 and construction took place in 1972-1973. The church does not have a traditional altarpiece, but above the altar hangs a pendant called "cross symbol" made by visual artist and theologian Hein Heinsen. The church is also decorated with four large murals by the visual artist Bjørg Hausle Bondevik. The new church was consecrated on 16 December 1973.

== See also ==
- List of churches in Bjørgvin
