= Sandvik Church =

Church in Vestland, Norway

- Sandvikskirken
- Sandviken kirke
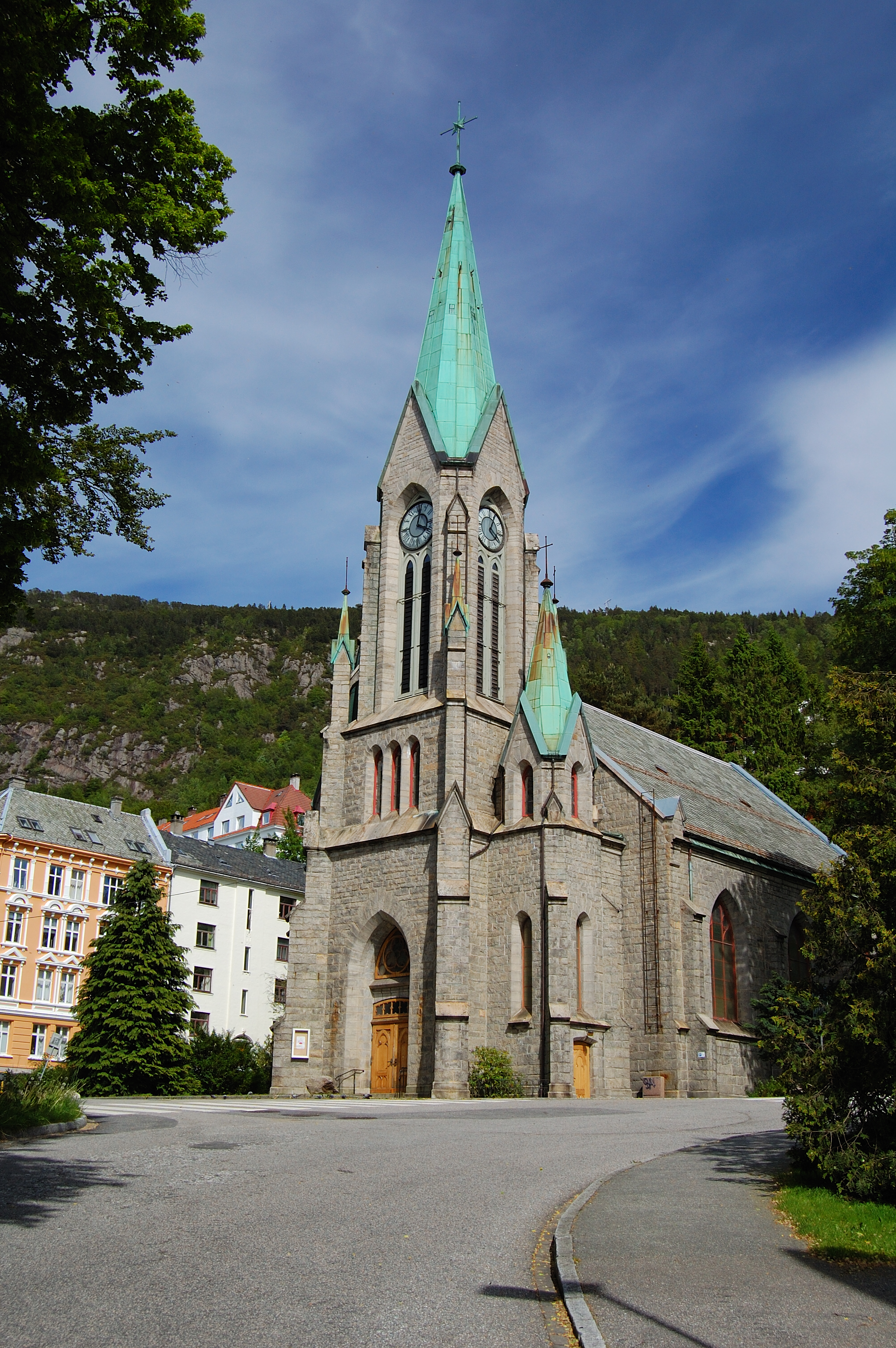
- View of the church
- Sandvik Church
- 60°24′19″N 5°19′32″E
- Location: Bergen, Vestland
- Country: Norway
- Denomination: Church of Norway
- Churchmanship: Evangelical Lutheran

History
- Status: Parish church
- Founded: 1881
- Consecrated: 30 December 1881

Architecture
- Functional status: Active
- Architect(s): Ernst Norgrenn and Schak Bull
- Architectural type: Long church
- Style: Neo-Gothic
- Completed: 1881 (145 years ago)

Specifications
- Capacity: 500
- Materials: Stone

Administration
- Diocese: Bjørgvin bispedømme
- Deanery: Bergen domprosti
- Parish: Sandviken
- Norwegian Cultural Heritage Site
- Type: Church
- Status: Protected
- ID: 85394

Sandvik Church (Norwegian: Sandvikskirken) is a parish church of the Church of Norway in Bergen Municipality in Vestland county, Norway. It is located in the Sandviken neighborhood in the city of Bergen. It is the church for the Sandviken parish, which is part of the Bergen domprosti (arch-deanery) in the Diocese of Bjørgvin. The brown, stone church was built in a long church design in 1881 using plans drawn up by the architects Ernst Norgrenn and Schak Bull. The church seats about 500 people.

== History ==
In 1874, the Sandviken neighborhood was separated from the Korskirken parish to become its own parish. In 1876, the area became a part of the city of Bergen. Since the new parish had no church, a limited architectural competition was held between Conrad Fredrik von der Lippe, Giovanni Müller, and Ernst Norgrenn to determine who would design the new church. Ernst Norgrenn won and was hired to design the church; however, he died in 1880, before the church was completed. His assistant, Schak Bull, completed the project. The large stone church was designed in a Neo-Gothic style. The church was consecrated on 30 December 1881. Initially, the church had a sacristy on the chancel's north and south sides. In 1903, the southern sacristy was enlarged to be similar to the one on the north side. In 1917–1918, both sacristies were expanded according to plans by the architect Caspar Hassel.

== Media gallery ==
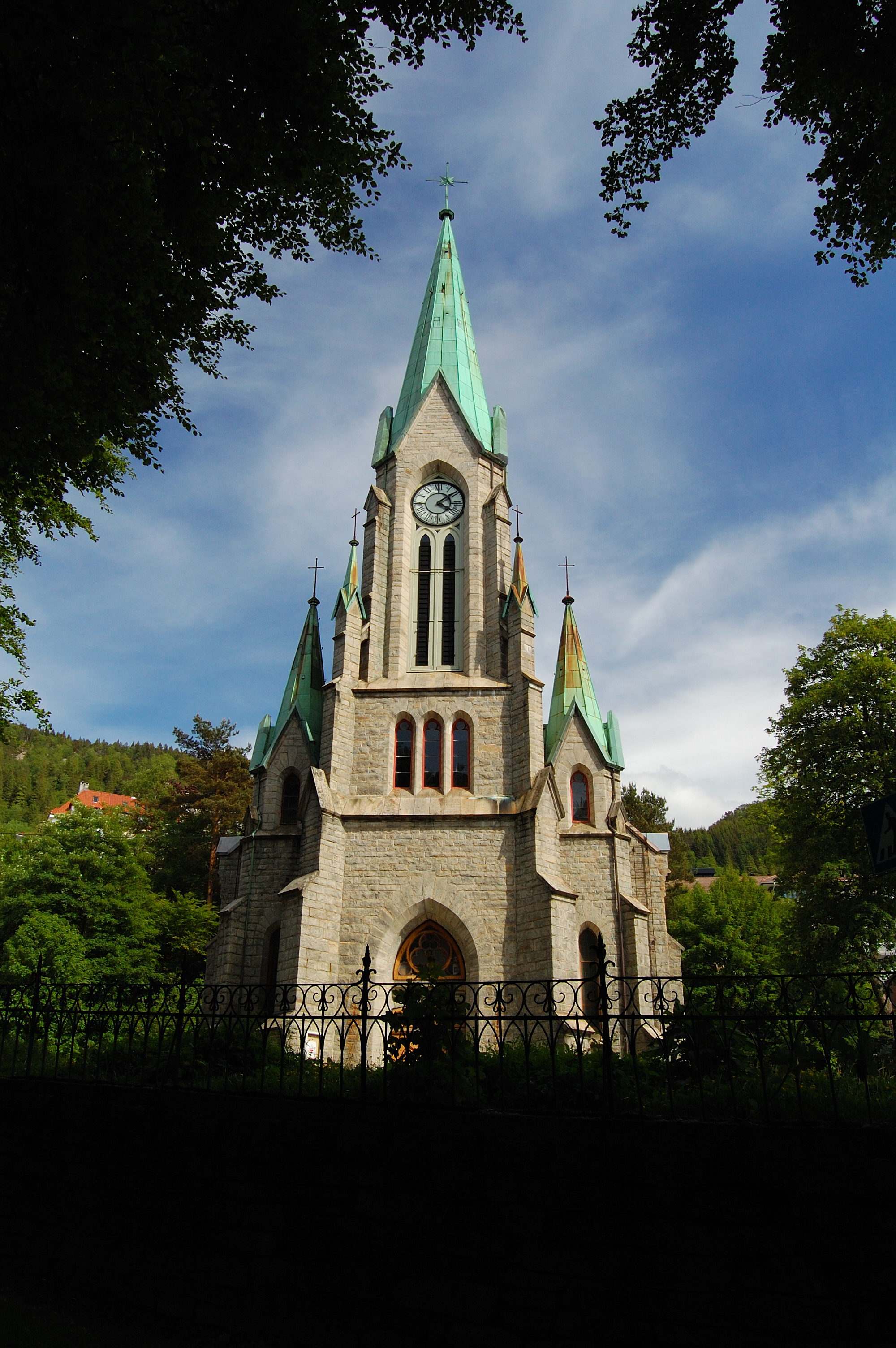

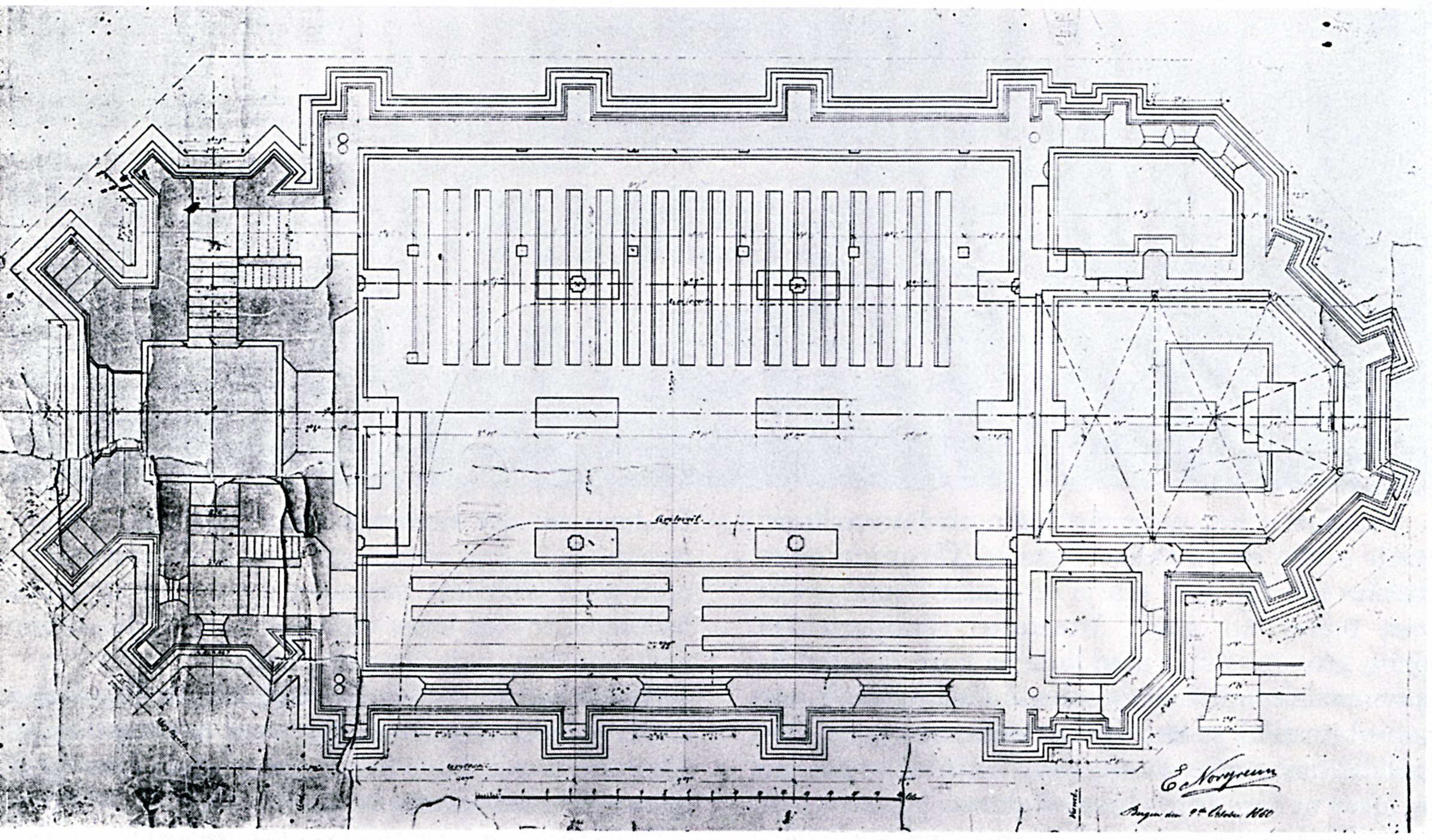
Original design of the church

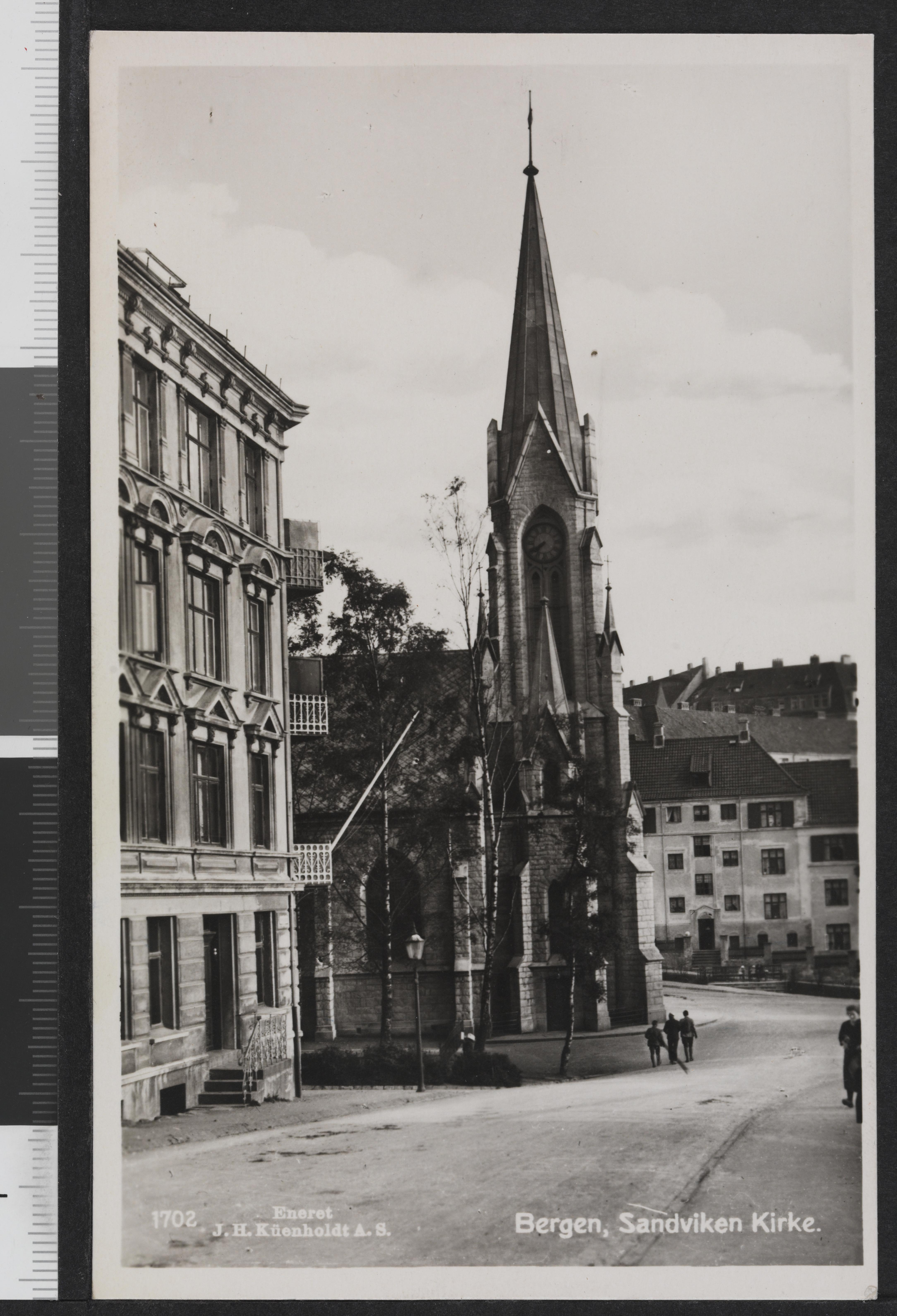

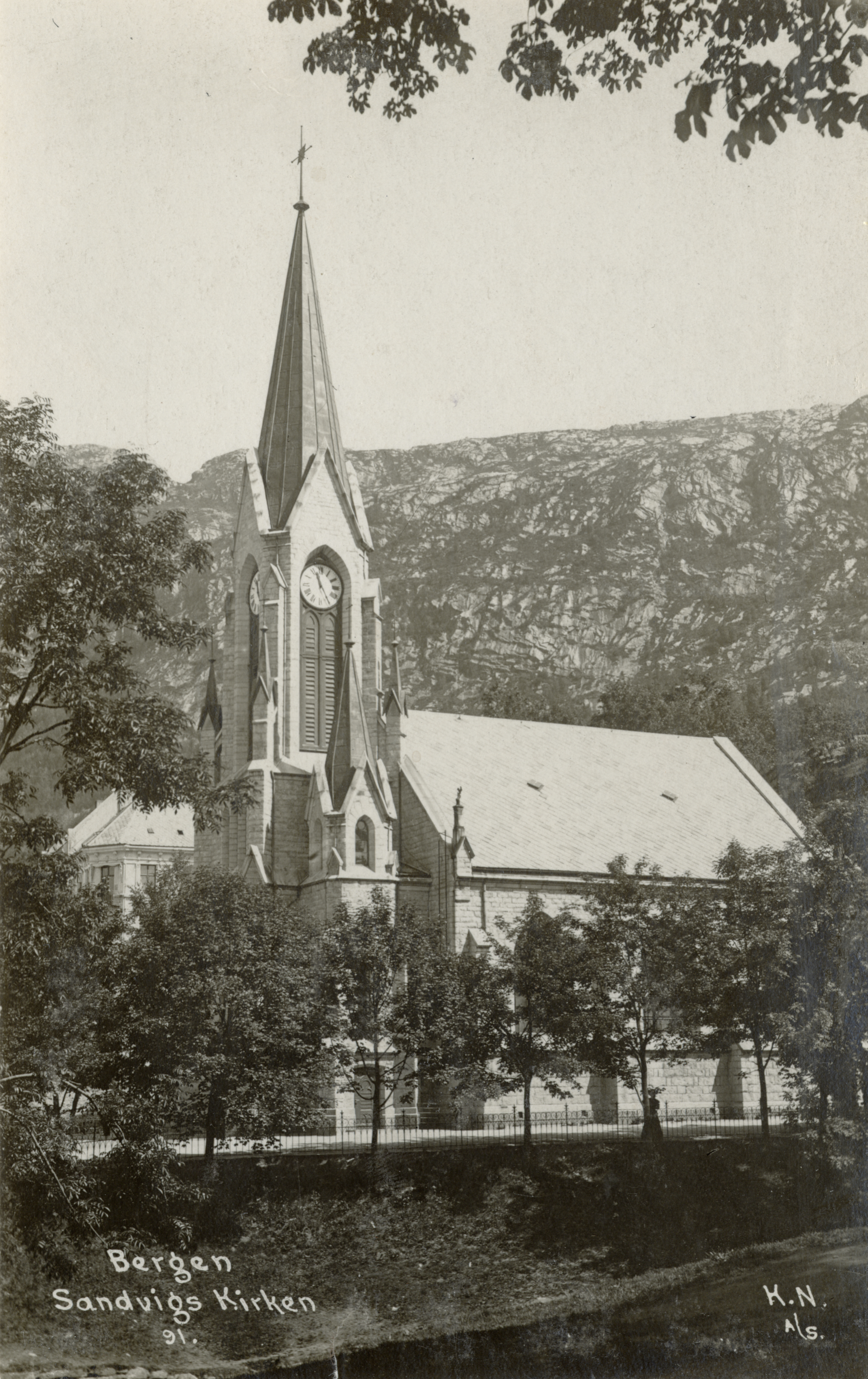

== See also ==
- List of churches in Bjørgvin
