= Solheim Church (Bergen) =

Church in Vestland, Norway

- Solheim kirke
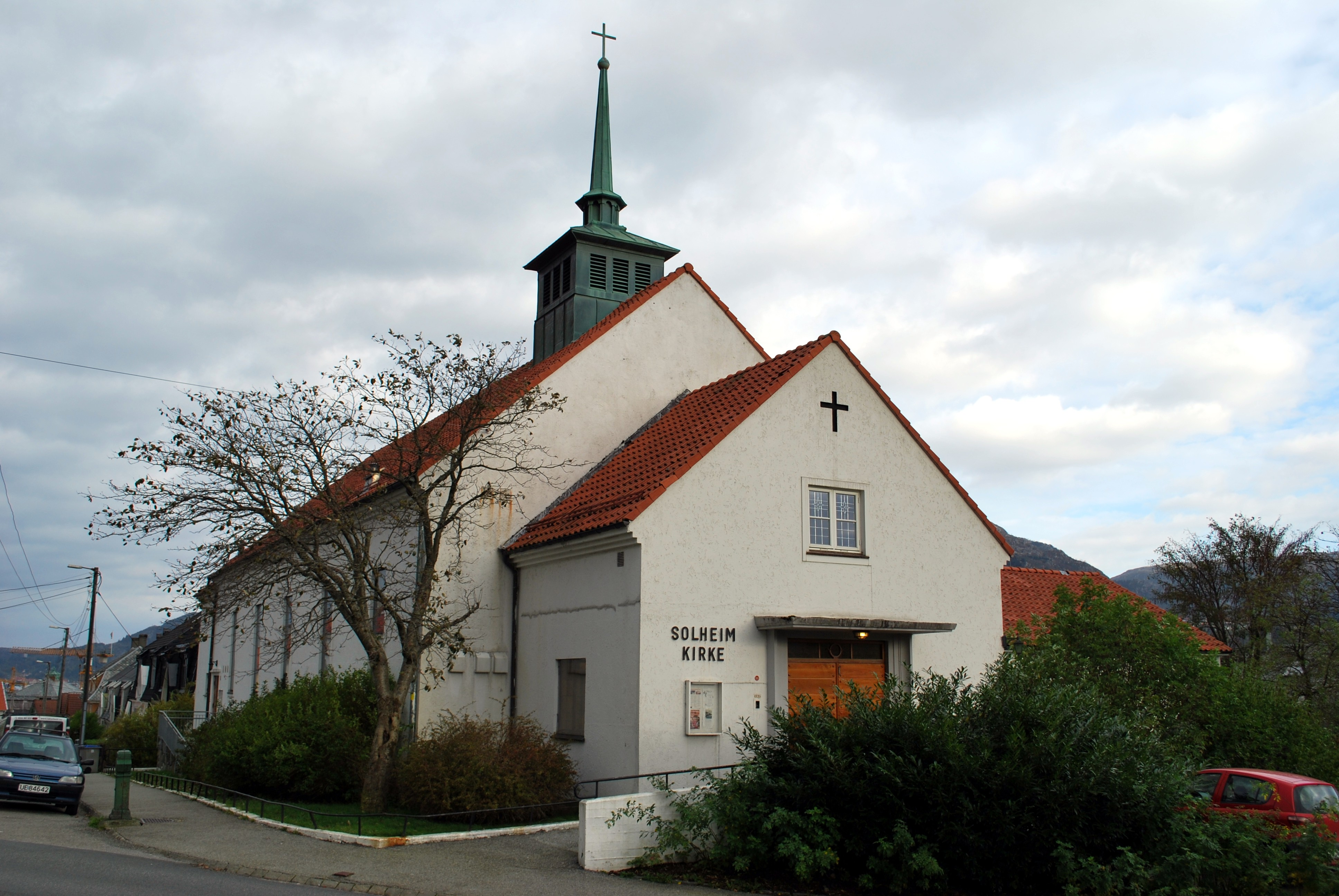
- View of the church
- Solheim Church
- 60°22′21″N 5°20′08″E
- Location: Bergen, Vestland
- Country: Norway
- Denomination: Church of Norway
- Churchmanship: Evangelical Lutheran

History
- Status: Parish church
- Founded: 1956
- Consecrated: 23 September 1956

Architecture
- Functional status: Active
- Architect: Peter Andersen
- Architectural type: Long church
- Completed: 1956 (70 years ago)

Specifications
- Capacity: 330
- Materials: Concrete

Administration
- Diocese: Bjørgvin bispedømme
- Deanery: Bergensdalen prosti
- Parish: Løvstakksiden
- Norwegian Cultural Heritage Site
- Type: Church
- Status: Listed locally
- ID: 85514

Solheim Church (Norwegian: Solheim kirke) is a parish church of the Church of Norway in Bergen Municipality in Vestland county, Norway. It is located in the Solheimsviken neighborhood in the city of Bergen. It is one of the two churches for the Løvstakksiden parish which is part of the Bergensdalen prosti (deanery) in the Diocese of Bjørgvin. The white, concrete church was built in a long church design in 1956 using plans drawn up by the architect Peter Andersen. The church seats about 330 people.

== History ==
The first church work in the Solheim area began in 1936. An interim church building was rented for a while before work on a new church began. In the early 1950s, planning began in earnest for a new church. Peter Andersen was hired to design the building and it was built in 1955–1956. The new church was consecrated on 23 September 1956. The new church was separated in 1958 to form its own parish.

== Media gallery ==
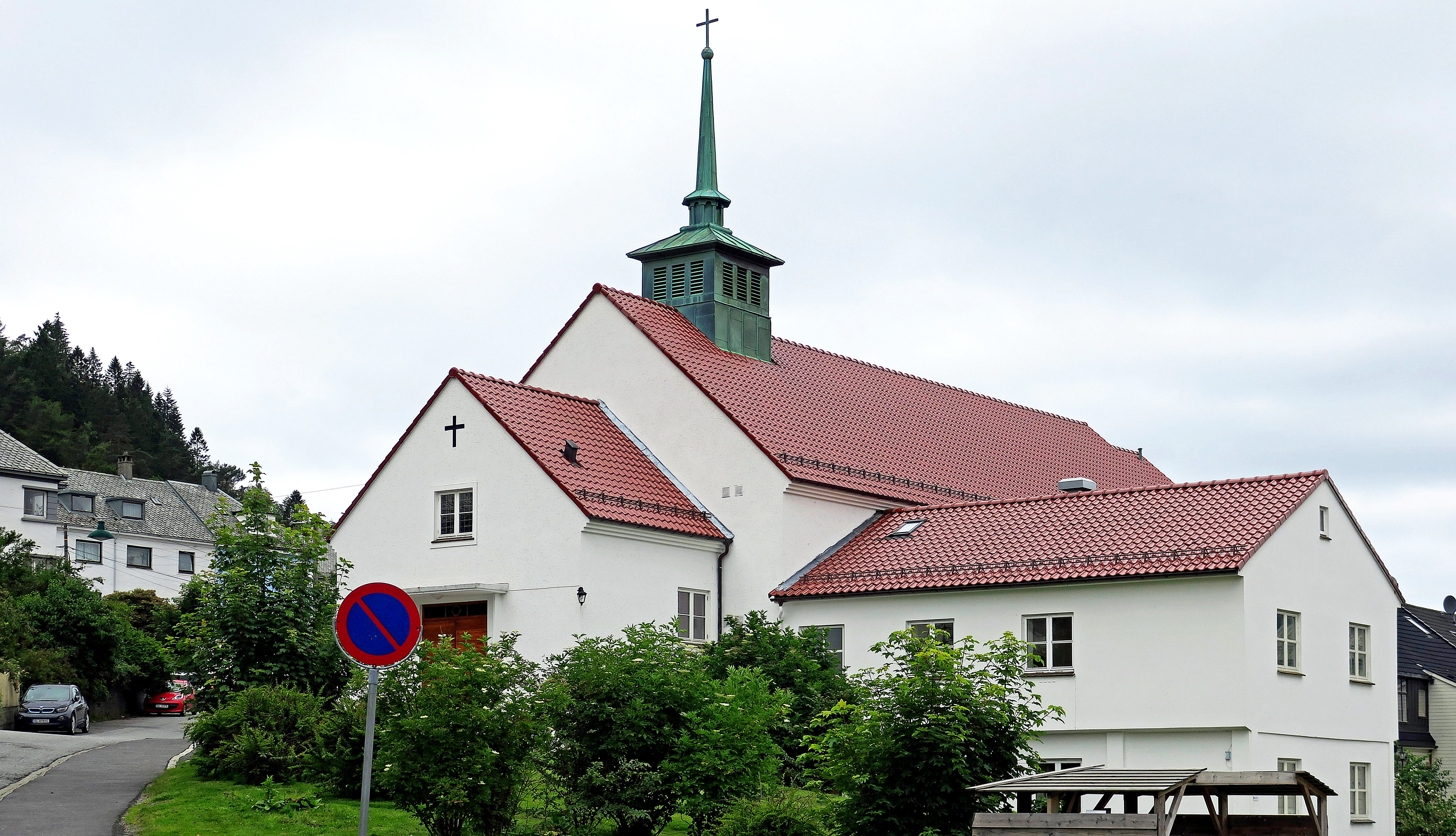

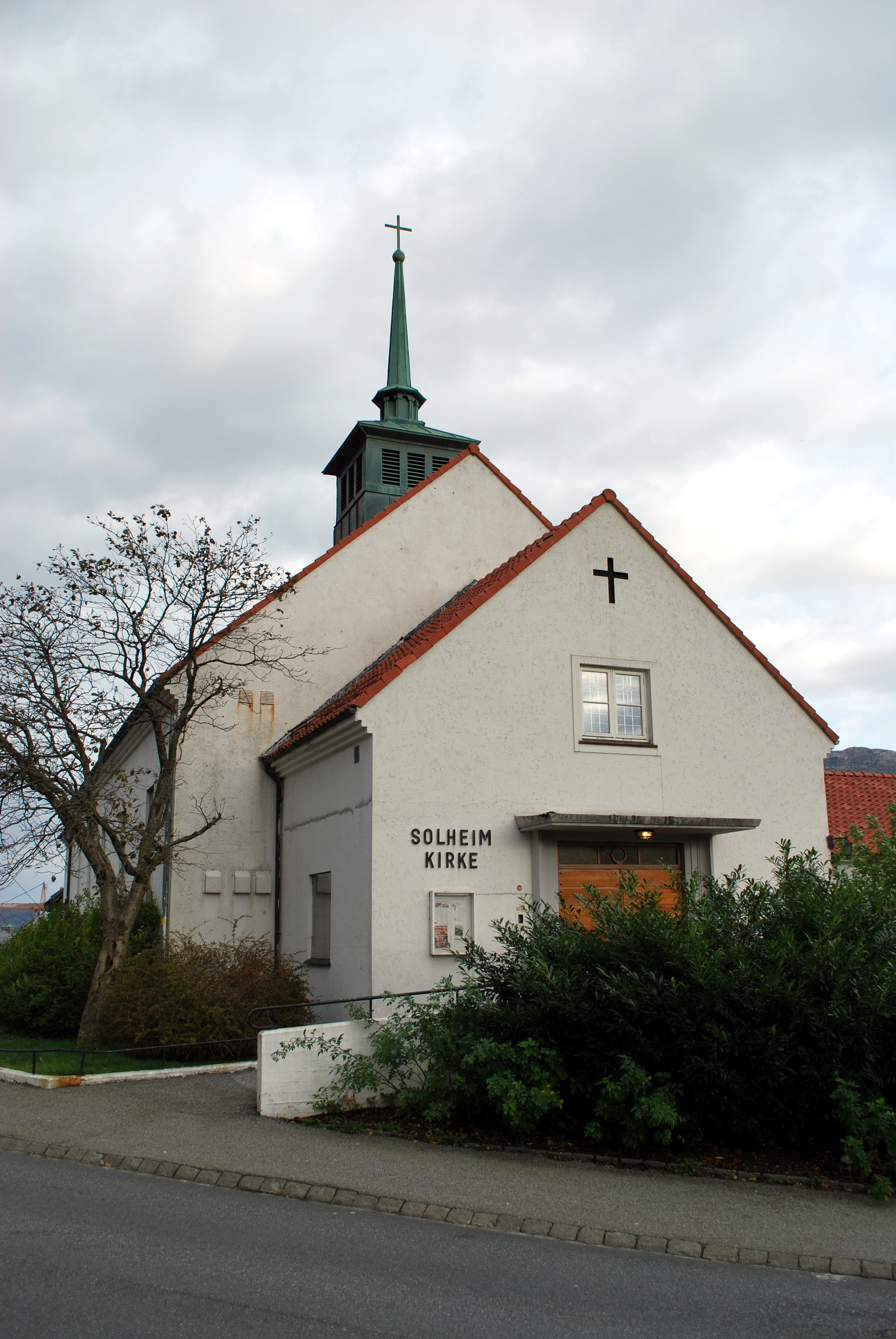

== See also ==
- List of churches in Bjørgvin
