= Fjell =

A fjell or fell is a high and barren landscape feature in Fennoscandia, the Isle of Man, parts of Northern England, and Scotland.

Fjell may also refer to:

== People ==
- Anders Fjell (born 1974), Norwegian psychologist, neuroscientist and professor
- Jan-Erik Fjell (born 1982), Norwegian novelist
- Kai Fjell (1907–1989), Norwegian painter, printmaker and scenographer
- Olav Fjell (born 1951), Norwegian businessperson

== Places ==
- Fjell Municipality, a former municipality in the old Hordaland county, Norway
- Fjell (village), a village in Øygarden municipality in Vestland county, Norway
- Fjell Church, a church in Øygarden municipality in Vestland county, Norway
- Fjell, Drammen, an area in the town of Drammen in Drammen municipality in Buskerud county, Norway
- Fjell Church (Drammen), a church in Drammen municipality in Buskerud county, Norway
- Fjell Fortress, a fortress on the island of Sotra in Vestland county, Norway
- Fjell, Innlandet, a village in Nord-Odal municipality in Innlandet county, Norway
- Fjell skole, a school in Drammen municipality in Buskerud county, Norway
