= Elsfjord Church =

Church in Nordland, Norway

- Elsfjord kirke
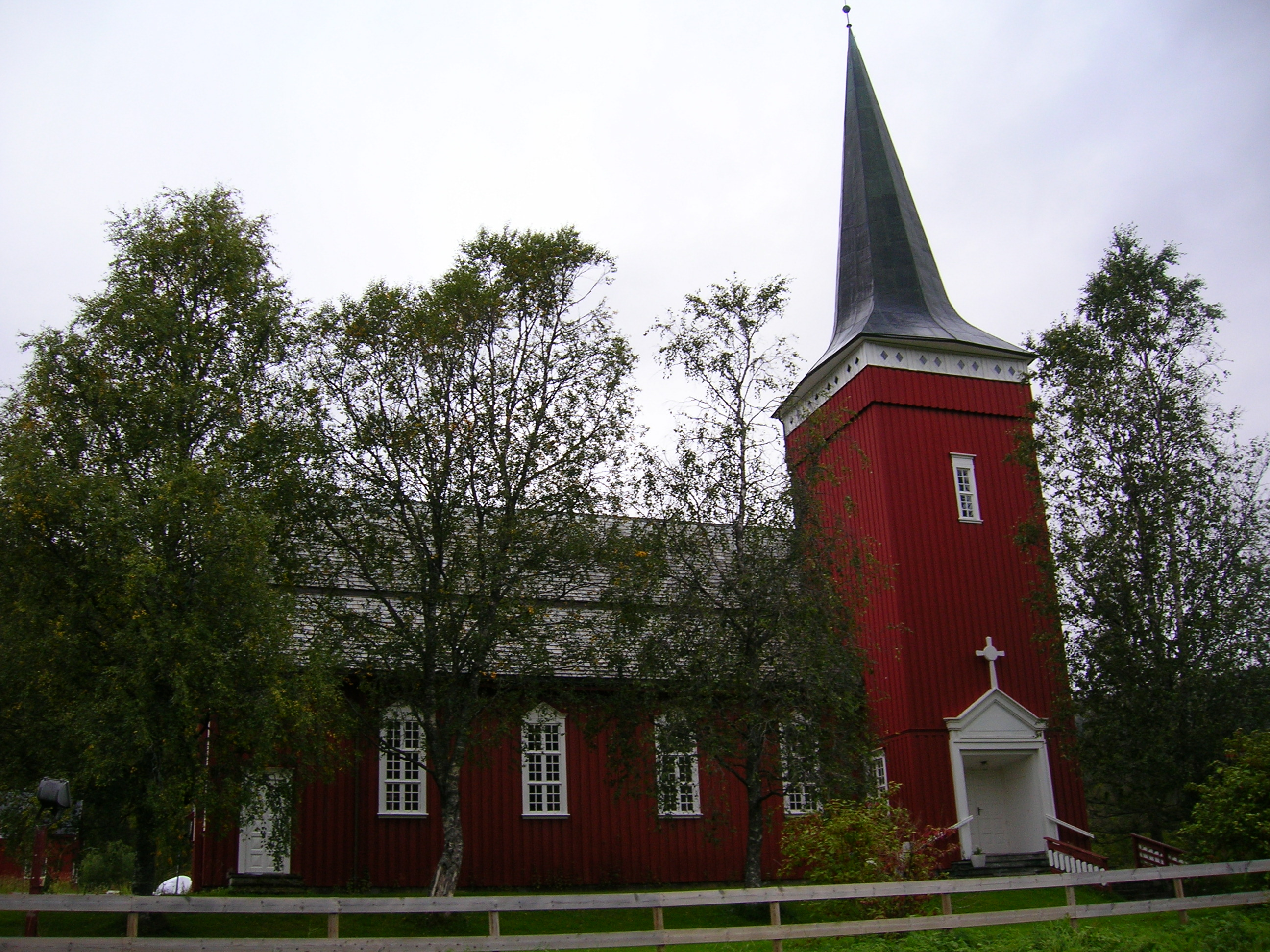
- View of the church
- Elsfjord Church
- 66.1059506°N 13.5452789°E
- Location: Vefsn Municipality, Nordland
- Country: Norway
- Denomination: Church of Norway
- Churchmanship: Evangelical Lutheran

History
- Status: Parish church
- Founded: 1955
- Consecrated: 18 Sept 1955

Architecture
- Functional status: Active
- Architect: Torgeir Alvsaker
- Architectural type: Long church
- Completed: 1955 (71 years ago)

Specifications
- Capacity: 200
- Materials: Wood

Administration
- Diocese: Sør-Hålogaland
- Deanery: Indre Helgeland prosti
- Parish: Elsfjord
- Norwegian Cultural Heritage Site
- Type: Church
- Status: Not protected
- ID: 84088

Elsfjord Church (Norwegian: Elsfjord kirke) is a parish church of the Church of Norway in Vefsn Municipality in Nordland county, Norway. It is located in the village of Elsfjord. It is the church for the Elsfjord parish which is part of the Indre Helgeland prosti (deanery) in the Diocese of Sør-Hålogaland. The red, wooden church was built in a long church style in 1955 using plans drawn up by the architect Torgeir Alvsaker. The church seats about 200 people. It was consecrated on 18 September 1955 and it cost a total of 247,000 kr, quite a bit over the planned budget.

== Media gallery ==
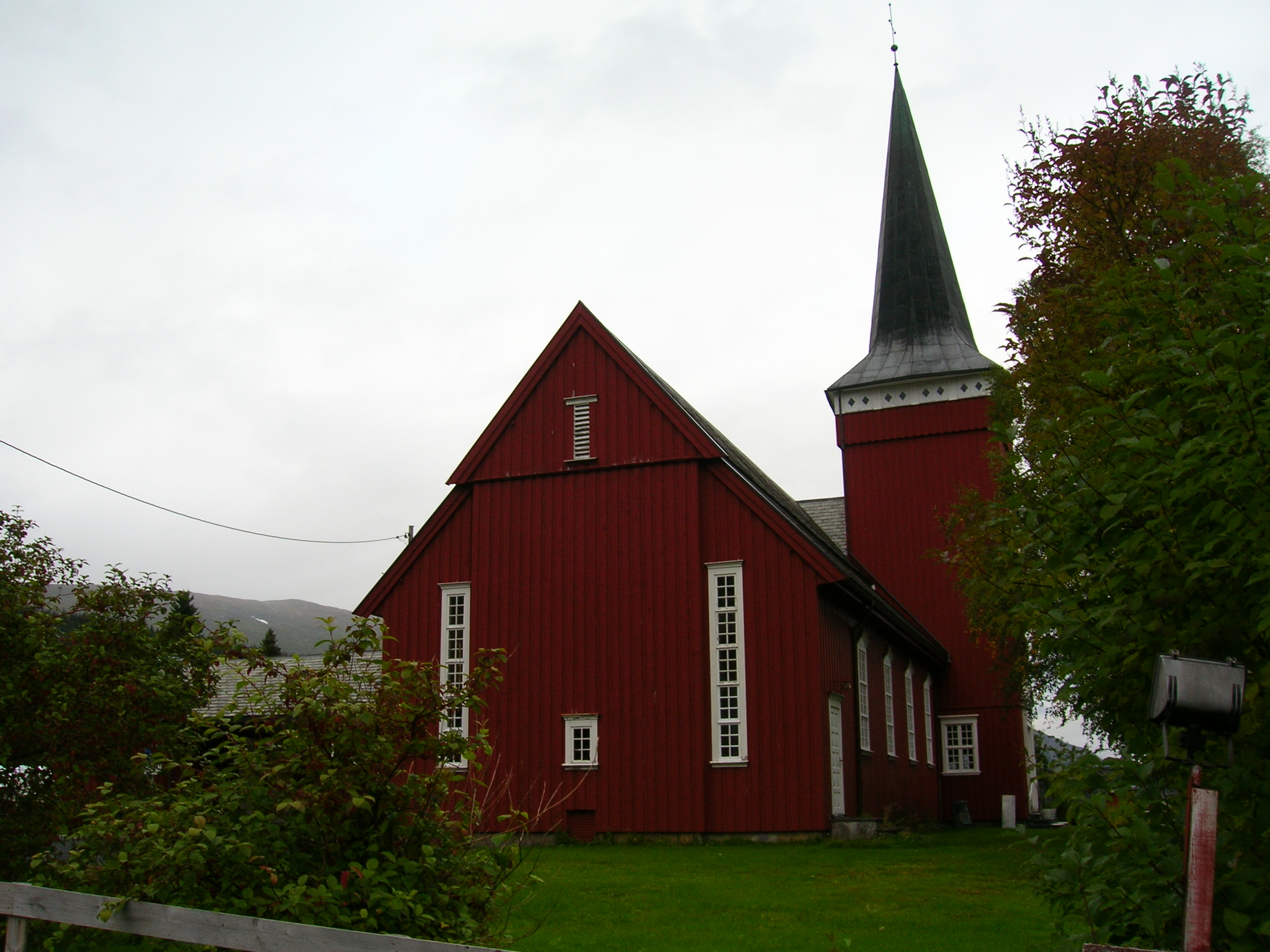
Exterior view

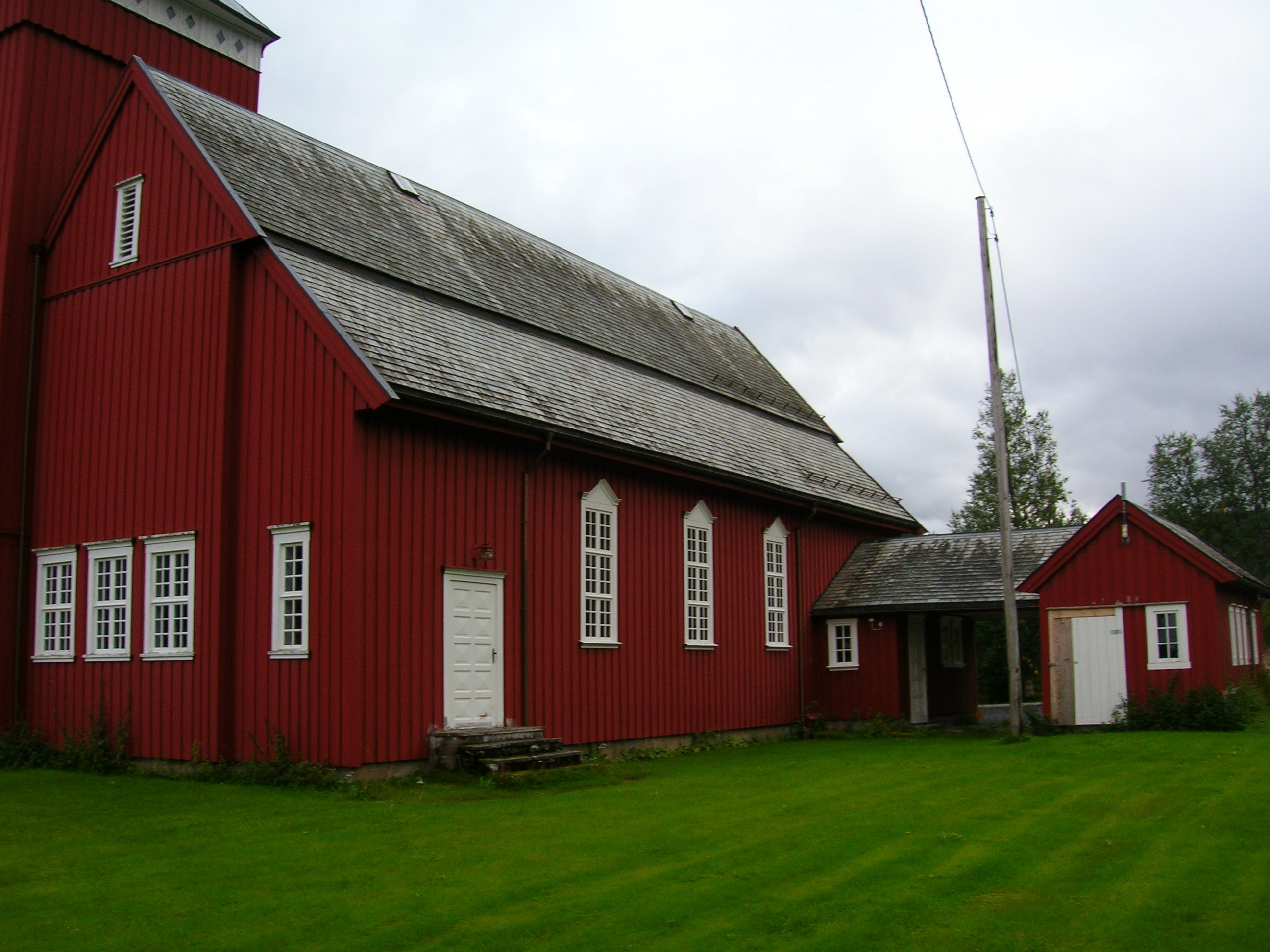
Exterior view

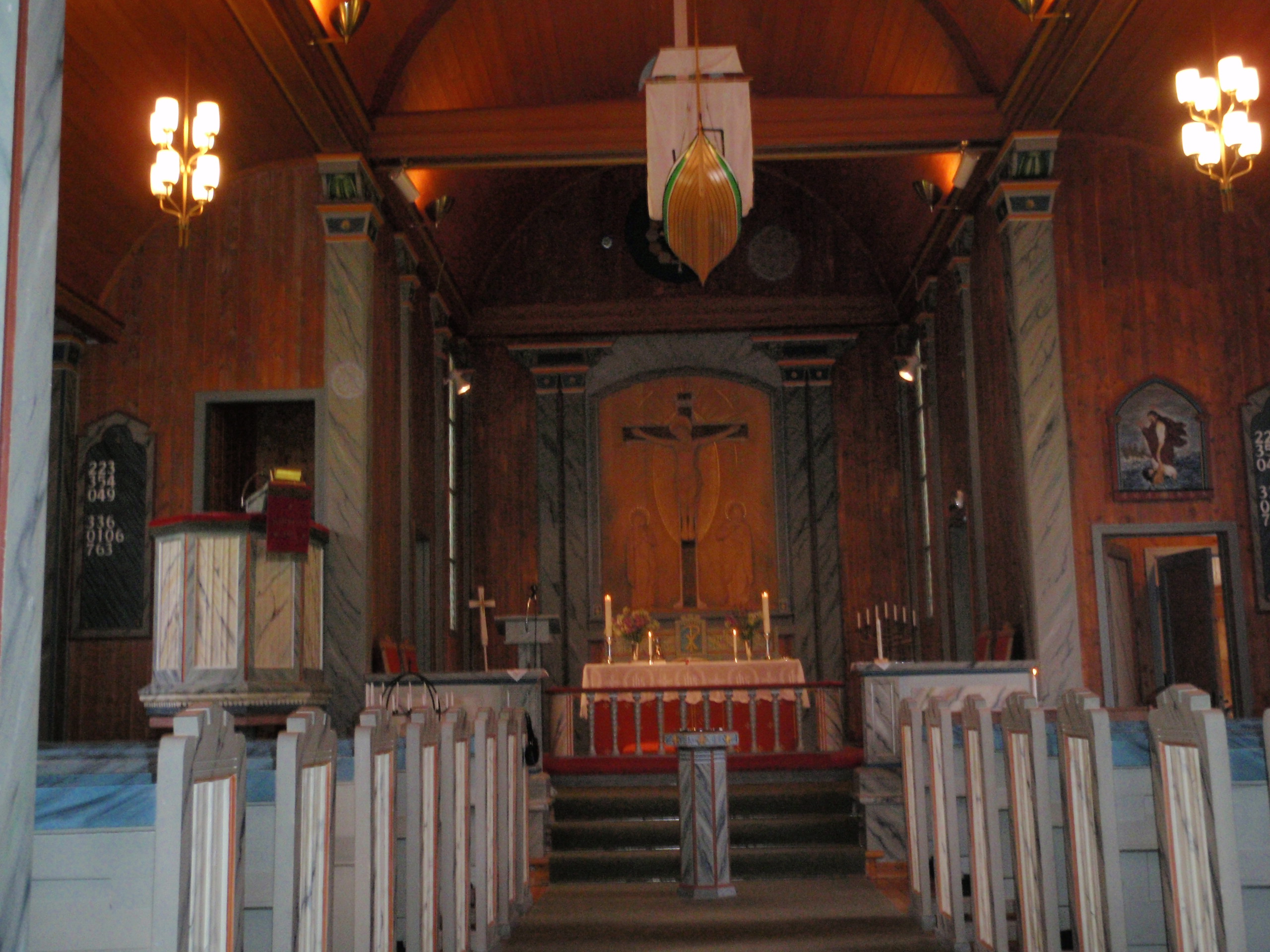
Interior view

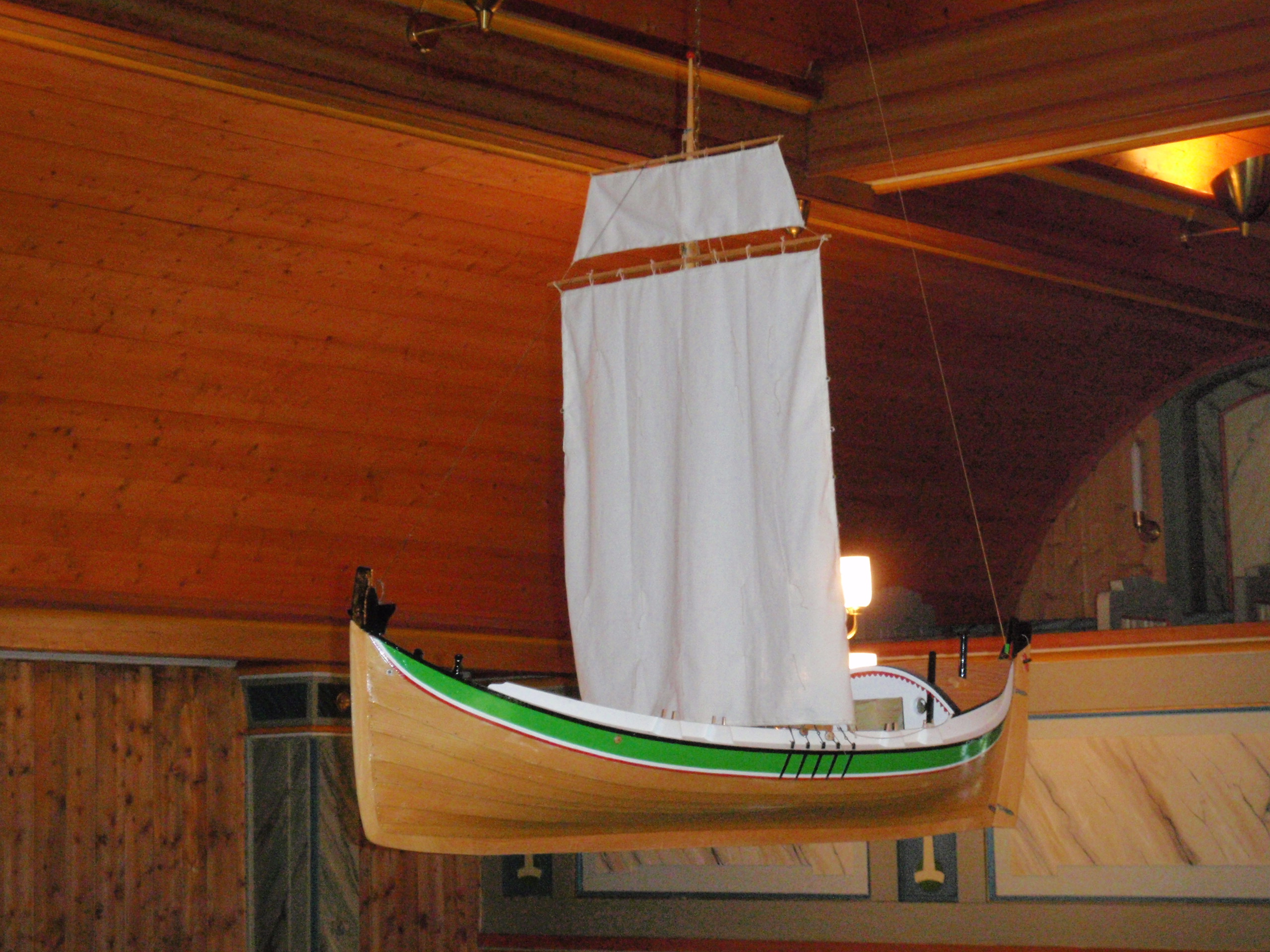
A model of a traditional Nordland boat

== See also ==
- List of churches in Sør-Hålogaland
