= Einar Vaardal-Lunde =

Norwegian architect

- Born: 20 June 1915; Tana, Norway
- Died: 14 September 2003 (aged 88); Bergen, Norway
- Education: Norwegian Institute of Technology
- Occupation: Architect

Einar Vaardal-Lunde (1915–2003) was a Norwegian architect.

Vaardal-Lunde was educated at the Norwegian Institute of Technology, graduating in 1940. After World War II, he participated in the rebuilding efforts and reconstruction in Finnmark until 1948. In 1948, he began his own architectural firm in partnership with Torgeir Alvsaker. In 1970, he opened his own architectural firm called E. Vaardal-Lunde. He designed a number of public buildings (hotels, churches, hospitals, and others), mostly in Western Norway.

== Works ==
- Ostereidet Church
- Vike Church
- Nygård Church
- Strusshamn Church
- Fjell Church
- Store-Kalsøy Chapel
