= Værlandet Chapel =

Church in Vestland, Norway

- Værlandet kapell
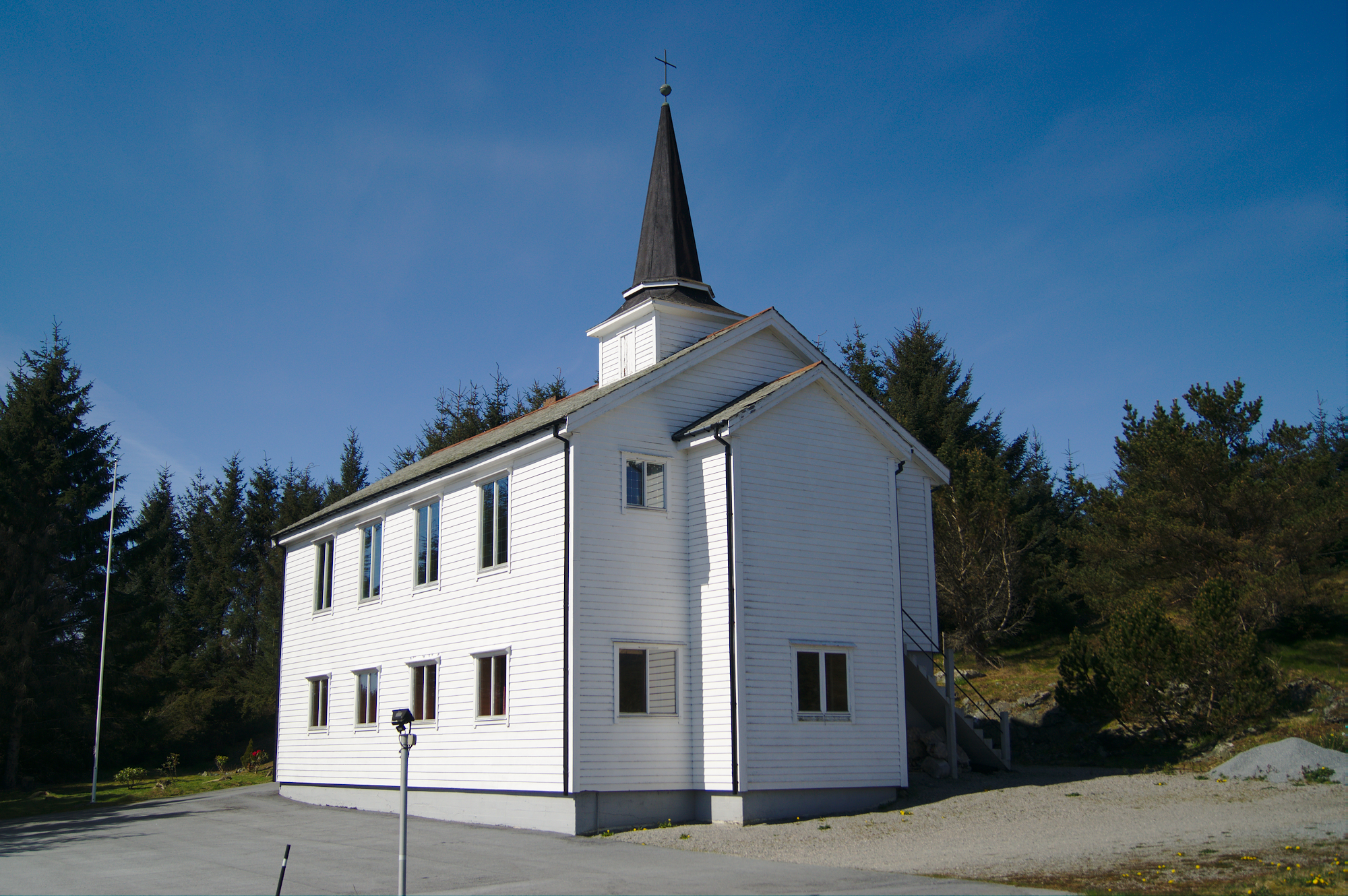
- View of the chapel
- Værlandet Chapel
- 61°18′40″N 4°43′53″E
- Location: Askvoll Municipality, Vestland
- Country: Norway
- Denomination: Church of Norway
- Churchmanship: Evangelical Lutheran

History
- Status: Chapel
- Founded: 1960
- Consecrated: 30 October 1960

Architecture
- Functional status: Active
- Architect: Torgeir Alvsaker
- Architectural type: Long church
- Completed: 1960 (66 years ago)
- Closed: 1 August 2014

Specifications
- Capacity: 170
- Materials: Brick

Administration
- Diocese: Bjørgvin bispedømme
- Deanery: Sunnfjord prosti
- Parish: Askvoll
- Norwegian Cultural Heritage Site
- Type: Church
- Status: Not protected
- ID: 85873

Værlandet Chapel (Norwegian: Værlandet bedehuskapell) is a chapel of the Church of Norway in Askvoll Municipality in Vestland county, Norway. It is located on the island of Værlandet. It is one of three annex chapels in the Askvoll parish which is part of the Sunnfjord prosti (deanery) in the Diocese of Bjørgvin. The white, brick chapel was built in a long church style in 1960 using plans drawn up by the architect Torgeir Alvsaker. The chapel seats about 170 people.

== History ==
Planning for a chapel in Værlandet began in the mid-1930s when some fundraising was carried out and a new cemetery was built. The planning was put on hold for quite some time soon after that when World War II broke out. After the war, work began on the new chapel in 1960. The chapel was consecrated on 30 October 1960 by the Bishop Ragnvald Indrebø. In addition to the main sanctuary, there are bathrooms and a cloakroom on the main floor. The basement houses a kitchen and a large meeting room/dining hall. In 1990, a new coat room and bathroom were added. On 1 August 2014, the chapel was taken out of regular use. This means that regular worship services are no longer held there, however, the church can still be used on special occasions.

== See also ==
- List of churches in Bjørgvin
