= Bakkasund =

Village in Austevoll Municipality, Norway

- Village
- Interactive map of Bakkasund
- Coordinates: 60.13082°N 5.08885°E
- Country: Norway
- Region: Western Norway
- County: Vestland
- District: Midhordland
- Municipality: Austevoll Municipality
- Elevation: 19 m (62 ft)
- Time zone: UTC+01:00 (CET)
  - Summer (DST): UTC+02:00 (CEST)
- Post Code: 5385 Bakkasund

Bakkasund is a village in Austevoll Municipality in Vestland county, Norway. The village is located on the southeastern side of the island of Storakalsøy. The mountain Mjuken lies about 1 kilometre (0.62 mi) north of the village. Storekalsøy Chapel is located in the village, serving the northwestern part of Austevoll Municipality. Prior to the opening of the Bakkasund Bridge (connecting this island to the neighboring Hundvåko island) in 1999, Bakkasund was the ferry port for the island of Storakalsøy, connecting it to several other islands in Austevoll Municipality.
