= Bleikvassli Church =

Church in Nordland, Norway

- Bleikvassli kirke
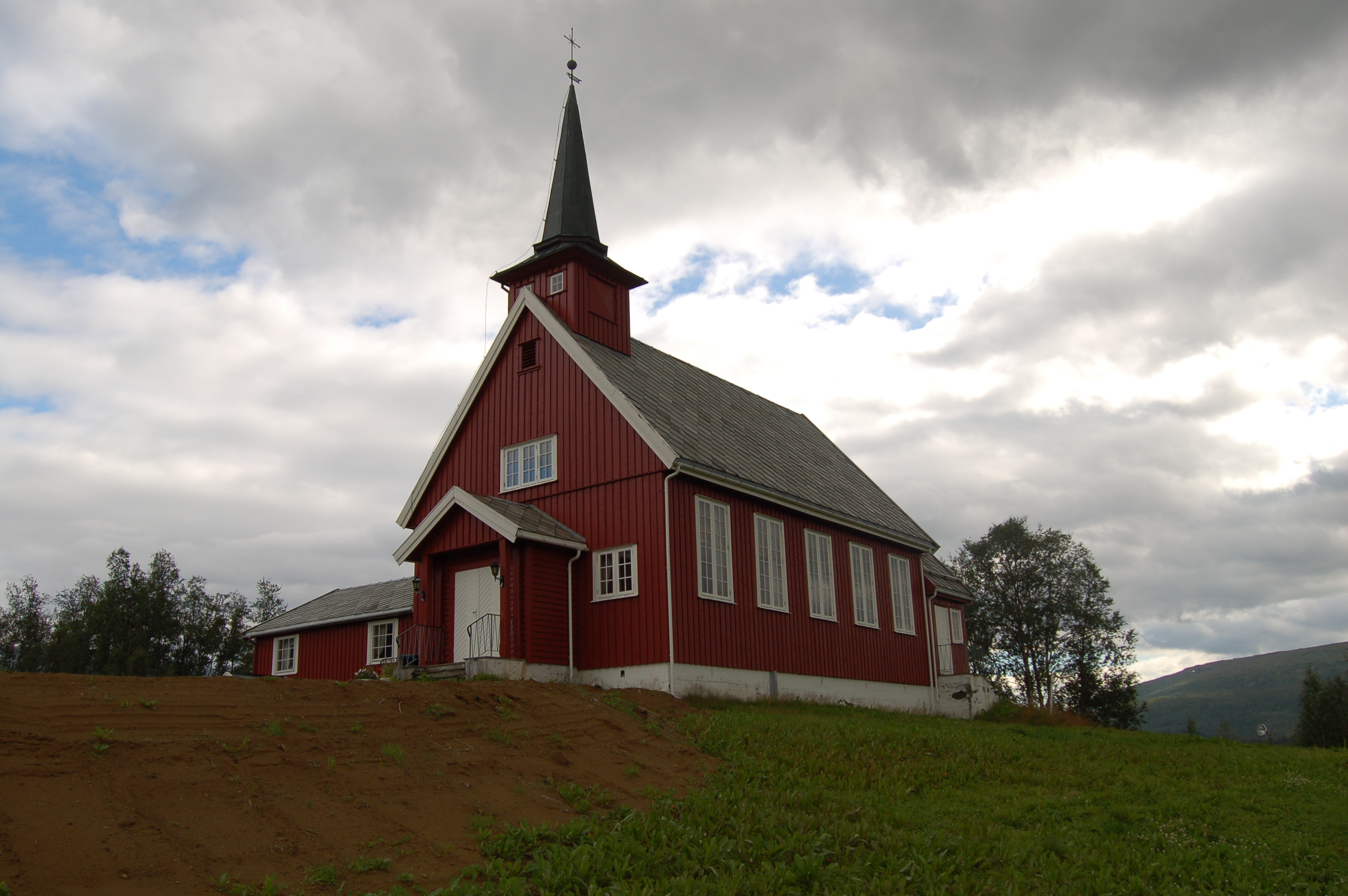
- View of the church
- Bleikvassli Church
- 65.9087785°N 13.8086316°E
- Location: Hemnes Municipality, Nordland
- Country: Norway
- Denomination: Church of Norway
- Churchmanship: Evangelical Lutheran

History
- Status: Parish church
- Founded: 1955
- Consecrated: 1955

Architecture
- Functional status: Active
- Architect: Torgeir Alvsaker
- Architectural type: Long church
- Completed: 1955 (71 years ago)

Specifications
- Capacity: 190
- Materials: Wood

Administration
- Diocese: Sør-Hålogaland
- Deanery: Indre Helgeland prosti
- Parish: Bleikvassli
- Norwegian Cultural Heritage Site
- Type: Church
- Status: Not protected
- ID: 83914

Bleikvassli Church (Norwegian: Bleikvassli kirke) is a parish church of the Church of Norway in Hemnes Municipality in Nordland county, Norway. It is located in the village of Bleikvasslia. It is the church for the Bleikvassli parish which is part of the Indre Helgeland prosti (deanery) in the Diocese of Sør-Hålogaland. The red, wooden church was built in a long church style in 1955 using plans drawn up by the architect Torgeir Alvsaker. The church seats about 190 people.

== See also ==
- List of churches in Sør-Hålogaland
