= Strusshamn Church =

Church in Vestland, Norway

- Strusshamn kirke
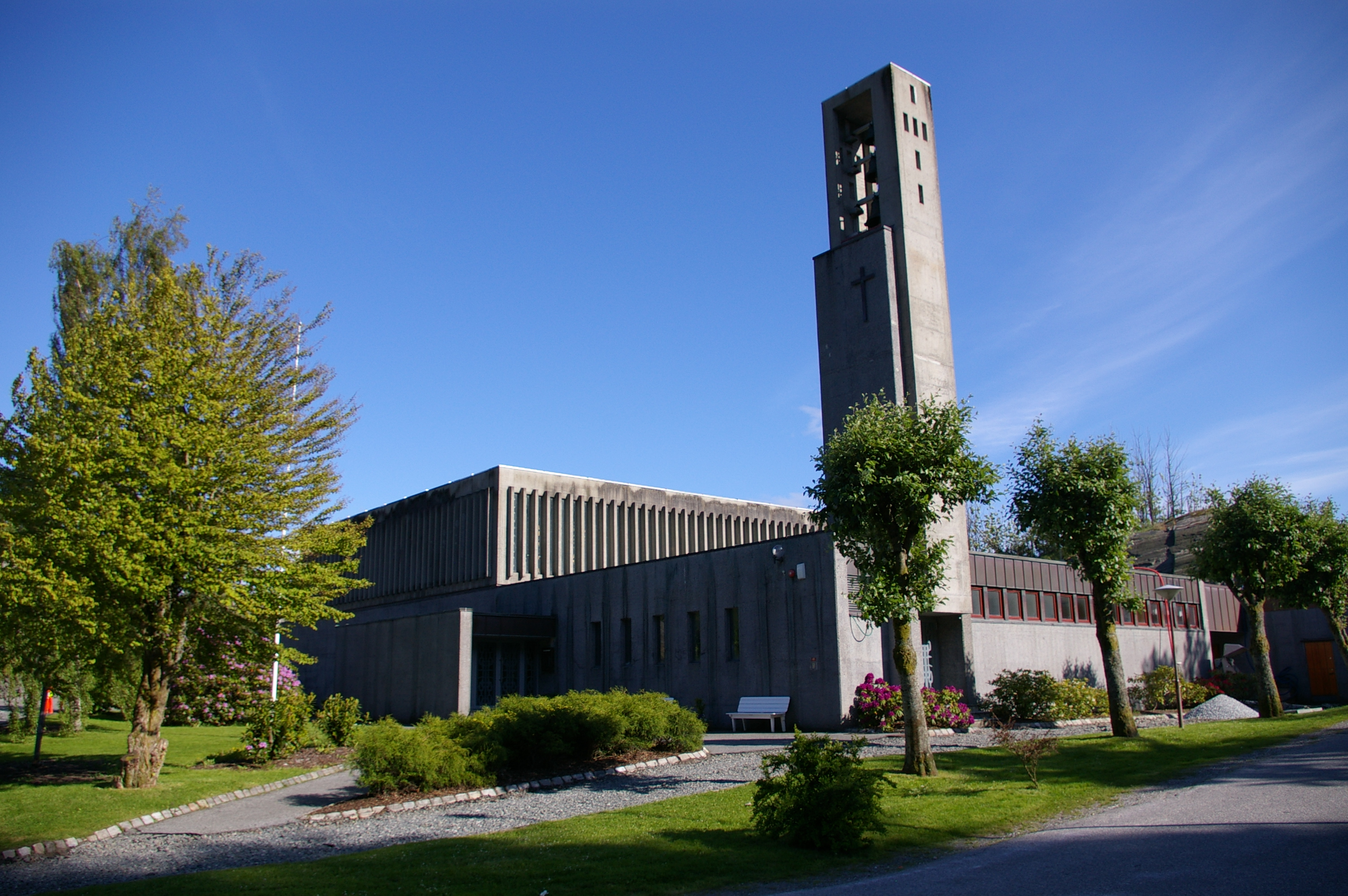
- View of the church
- Strusshamn Church
- 60°24′05″N 5°11′23″E
- Location: Askøy Municipality, Vestland
- Country: Norway
- Denomination: Church of Norway
- Churchmanship: Evangelical Lutheran

History
- Status: Parish church
- Founded: 1741
- Consecrated: 1969

Architecture
- Functional status: Active
- Architect(s): Torgeir Alvsaker and Einar Vaardal-Lunde
- Architectural type: Fan-shaped
- Completed: 1969 (57 years ago)

Specifications
- Capacity: 500
- Materials: Concrete and glass

Administration
- Diocese: Bjørgvin bispedømme
- Deanery: Vesthordland prosti
- Parish: Strusshamn
- Norwegian Cultural Heritage Site
- Type: Church
- Status: Not protected
- ID: 84982

Strusshamn Church (Norwegian: Strusshamn kirke) is a parish church of the Church of Norway in Askøy Municipality in Vestland county, Norway. It is located in the village of Strusshamn. It is the church for the Strusshamn parish which is part of the Vesthordland prosti (deanery) in the Diocese of Bjørgvin. The large concrete and glass church was built in a fan-shaped design in 1969 using plans drawn up by the architects Torgeir Alvsaker and Einar Vaardal-Lunde. The church seats about 500 people.

== History ==
=== First church ===
In 1741, the areas of Askøy and [[Laksevåg]] were separated from the main Bergen Cathedral parish and they became a parish of their own. It was decided that the old Ask Church was too small, and not centrally located so the old church was torn down in 1741. Soon after, a new church was built in the village of Strusshamn, near the foot of "Church Mountain" (Nynorsk: Kyrkjefjellet), about 300 metres (980 ft) north of the present site of the church. This became the new Strusshamn Church which was the main church for Askøy and Laksevåg. The new church was a small timber-framed building with 238 seats and 63 standing places. The church measured 18.5 metres (61 ft) long, 9.1 metres (30 ft) wide, and 4.7 metres (15 ft) tall.

In 1814, this church served as an election church (Norwegian: valgkirke). Together with more than 300 other parish churches across Norway, it was a polling station for elections to the 1814 Norwegian Constituent Assembly which wrote the Constitution of Norway. This was Norway's first national elections. Each church parish was a constituency that elected people called "electors" who later met together in each county to elect the representatives for the assembly that was to meet at Eidsvoll Manor later that year.

During the night of 8 September 1861, a fire started in the flour mill next door to the church, and both buildings burned down.

=== Second church ===
Work immediately started to build a new church. It was decided to build the replacement church about 300 metres (980 ft) south of the old church site, on a small headland in the harbour. The new church was built by architect Georg Andreas Bull (the brother of the more famous Ole Bull) and the lead builder was Askild Aase. This was a wooden cruciform church with a total of 727 seats. The new church had a nave measuring 15.5 by 14 metres (51 ft × 46 ft) and a chancel measuring 7 metres (23 ft) wide on the east end of the building along with a small sacristy. A church porch with a tower was on the west end of the nave. Overall, the entire church was 29 metres (95 ft) long and 20 metres (66 ft) wide across the transept. The new church was finished in 1864 and it was consecrated by Bishop Peder Hersleb Graah Birkeland on 30 September 1864. After the fire at the old church, some items were recovered from the old church and moved to the new church. This included two brass chandeliers, two apostle figures, and a mass vestment. The altarpiece, painted by Johan Ludvig Losting, was also rescued from the old church. The church was significantly remodeled in 1920 when it was wired for electricity. The last renovation was done in 1964 to celebrate its centennial anniversary. Then on the night of 29-30 January 1966, there was a fire and this church burned to the ground also. Only a few things were saved including two candlesticks and a baptismal bowl.

=== Third church ===
The present church was built shortly after the 1966 fire by the architects Torgeir Alvsaker and Einar Vaardal-Lunde. This church was built out of concrete and glass and it is able to seat about 500 people. This church was consecrated by Bishop Per Juvkam on 11 May 1969. The church was greatly expanded in 2009 by adding a large interior atrium and two church halls. The expansion nearly doubled the area of the building.

== Media gallery ==
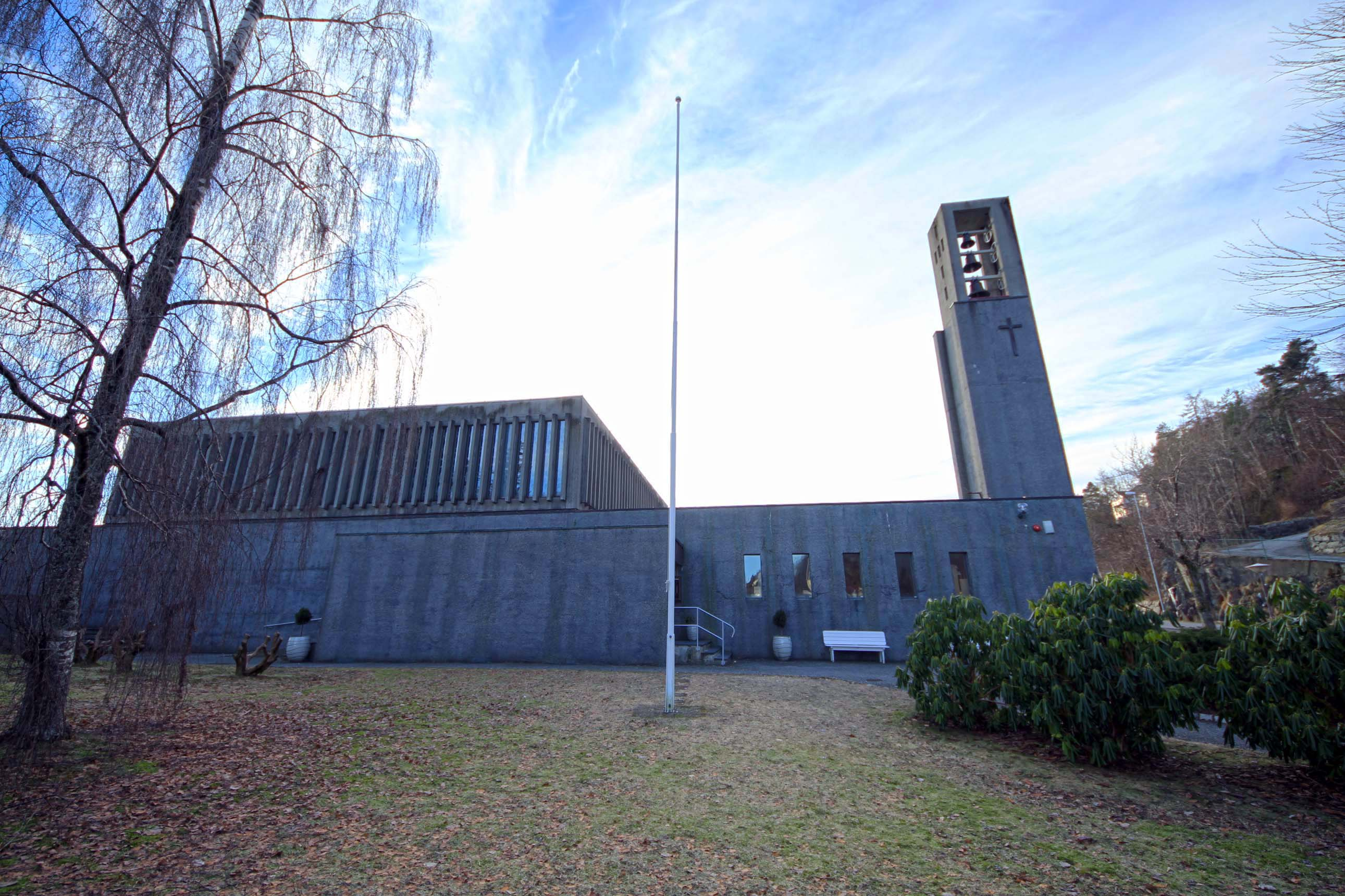
Present church exterior (2011)

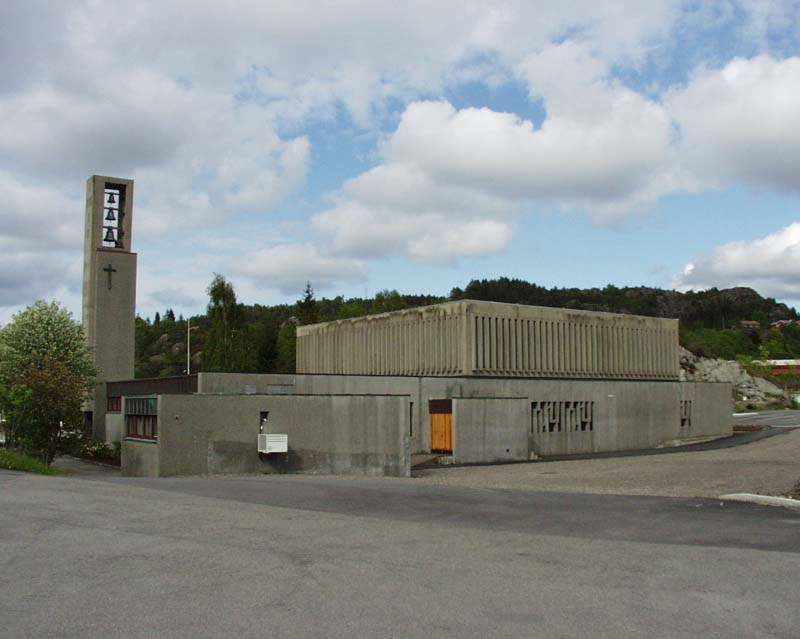
Exterior view (2006)

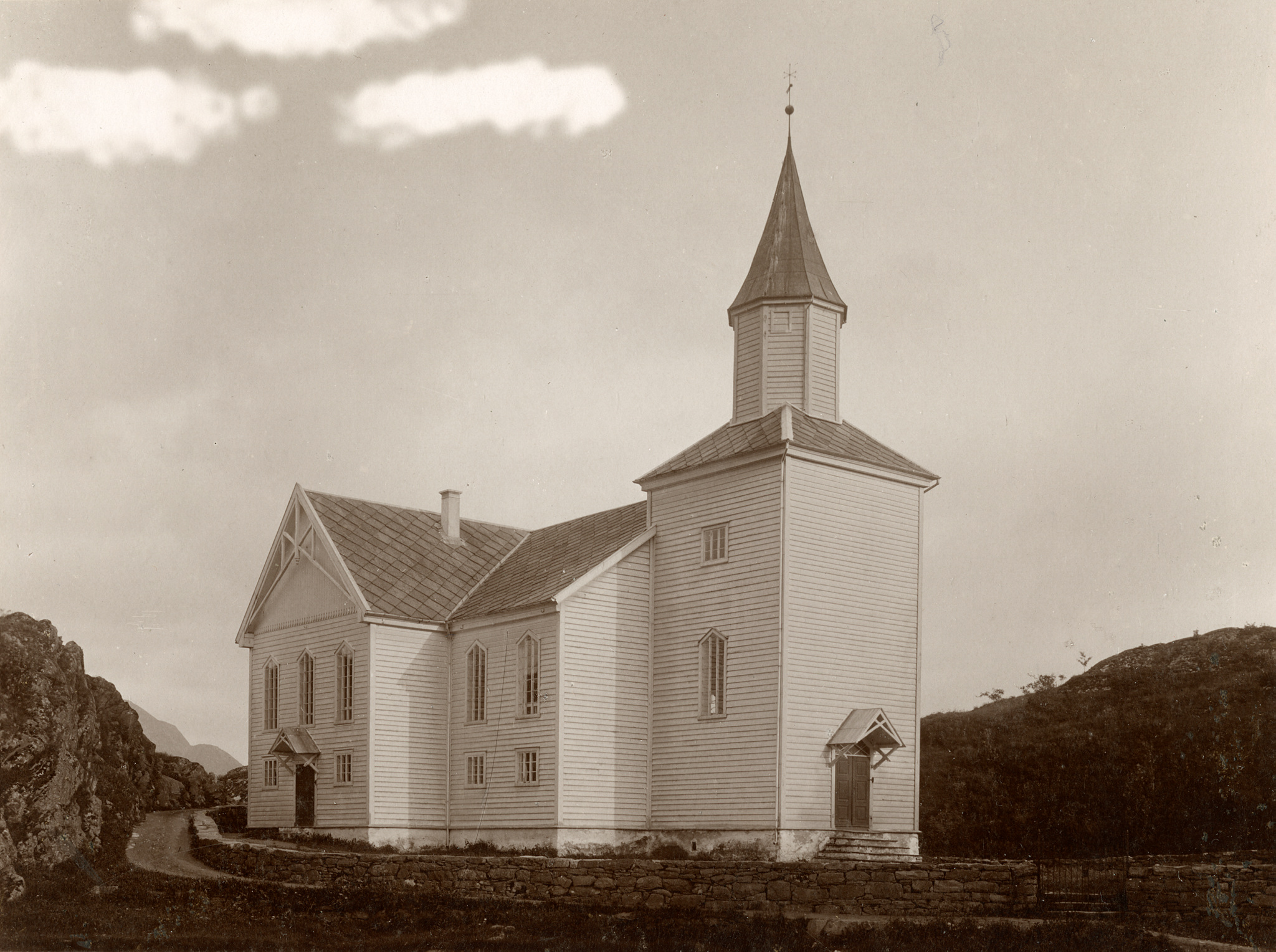
Exterior view of the 2nd church (c. 1930)

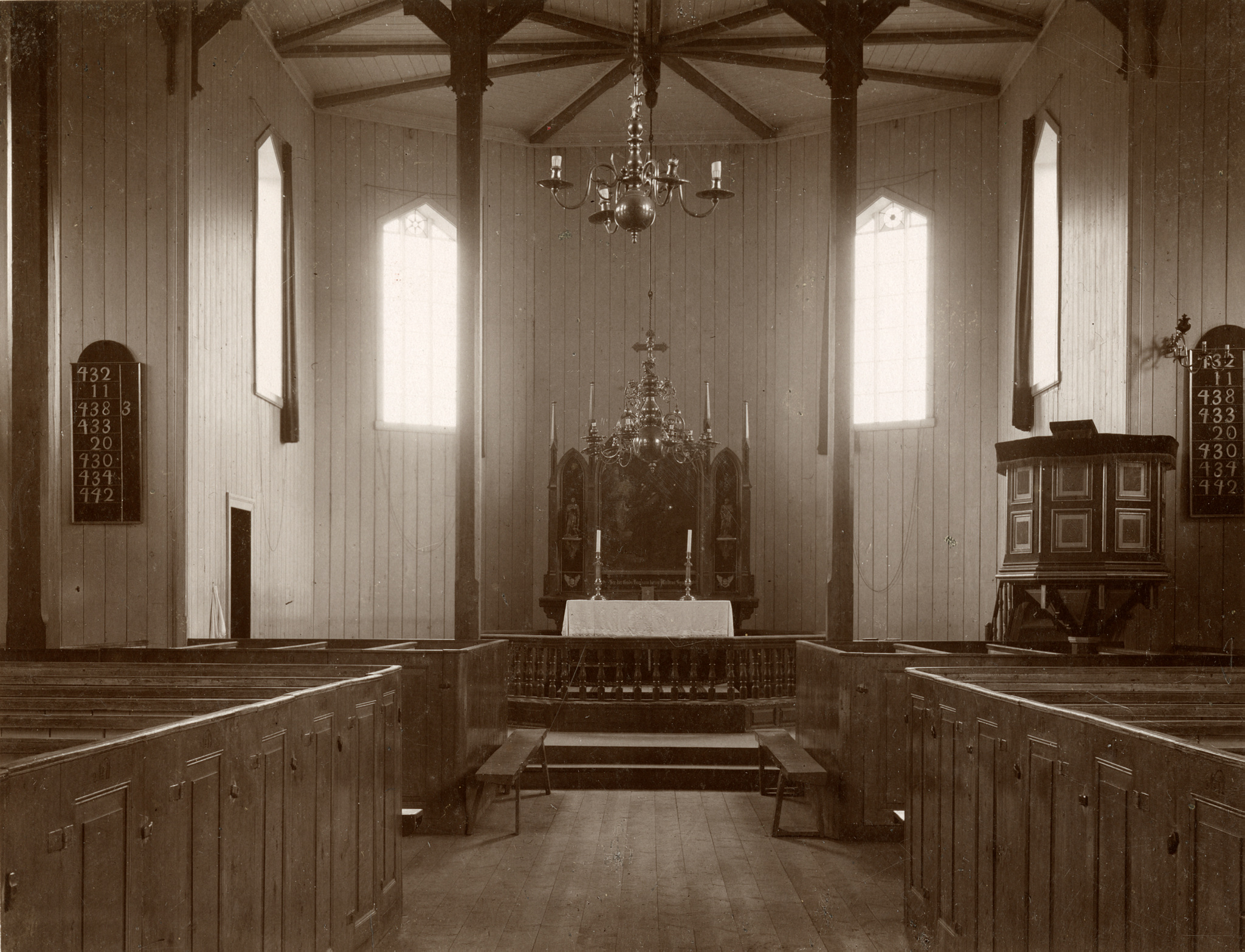
Interior view of the 2nd church (c. 1930)

== See also ==
- List of churches in Bjørgvin
