= Stolmen Church =

Church in Vestland, Norway

- Stolmen kyrkje
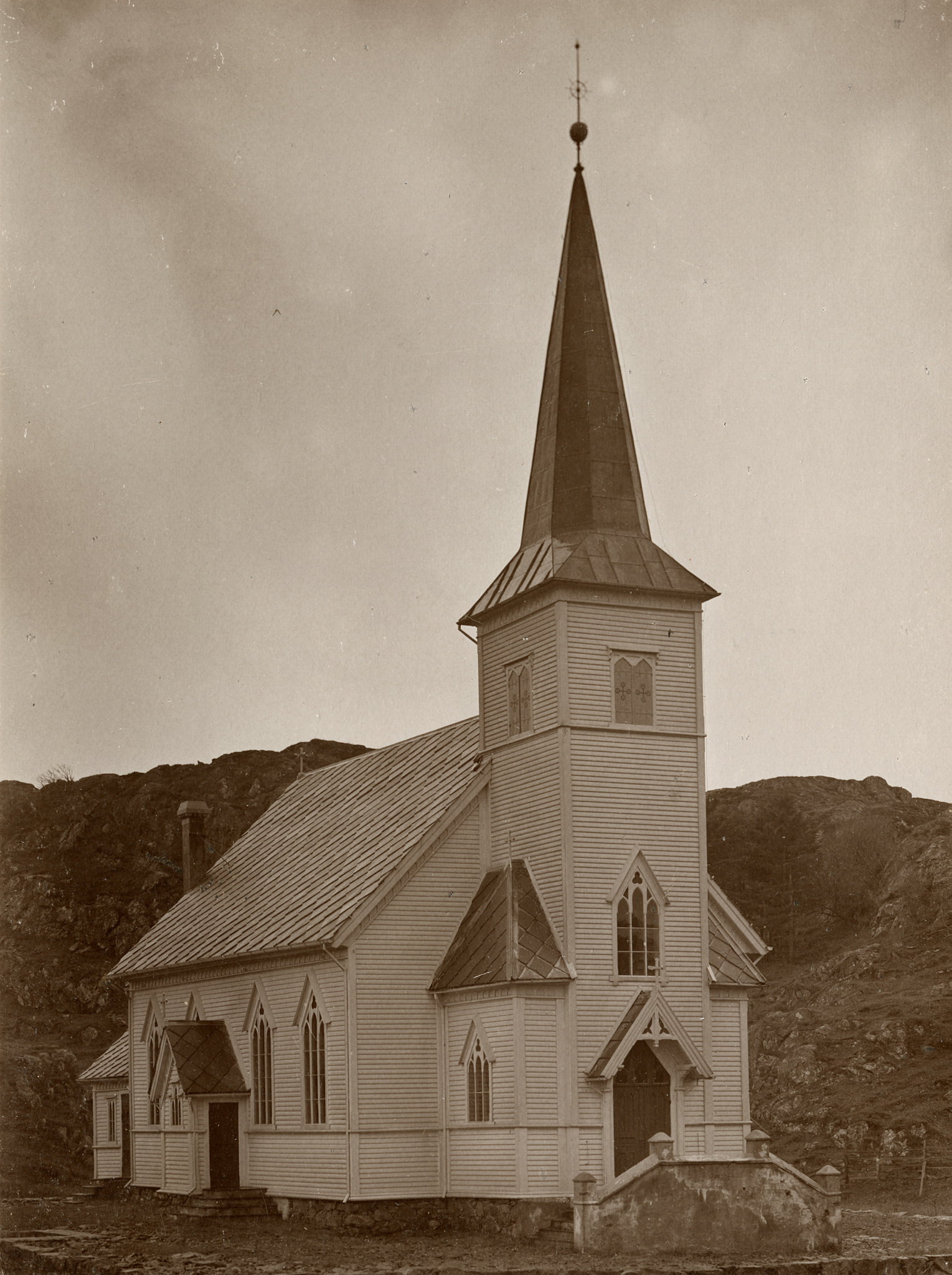
- View of the church
- Stolmen Church location (the old location on Møkster is also marked)
- 60°00′41″N 5°04′53″E
- Location: Austevoll Municipality, Vestland
- Country: Norway
- Denomination: Church of Norway
- Previous denomination: Catholic Church
- Churchmanship: Evangelical Lutheran

History
- Former name: Møkster kyrkje
- Status: Parish church
- Founded: 13th century
- Consecrated: 29 June 1892

Architecture
- Functional status: Active
- Architect: Hans Henrich Jess
- Architectural type: Long church
- Completed: 1891 (135 years ago)

Specifications
- Capacity: 320
- Materials: Wood

Administration
- Diocese: Bjørgvin bispedømme
- Deanery: Fana prosti
- Parish: Austevoll
- Norwegian Cultural Heritage Site
- Type: Church
- Status: Not listed
- ID: 85084

Stolmen Church (Norwegian: Stolmen kyrkje; historic name: Møkster kirke) is a parish church of the Church of Norway in Austevoll Municipality in Vestland county, Norway. It is located in the village of Kvalvåg on the island of Stolmen, although historically it was located on the small island of Møkster, hence the name. It is one of the five churches for the Austevoll parish which is part of the Fana prosti (deanery) in the Diocese of Bjørgvin. The white, wooden church was built in a long church style in 1892 using plans drawn up by the architect Hans Heinrich Jess. The church seats about 320 people.

== History ==
The earliest existing historical records of the church date back to the year 1306, but the church was not new that year. The first Møkster Church was a wooden stave church that was located on the island of Møkster in the central part of the Austevoll archipelago. That church was likely built during the 13th century. In 1686, the old stave church was demolished and a new timber-framed long church was built on the same site. It had a rectangular 10.1-by-7.6-metre (33 ft × 25 ft) nave and a narrower, straight-ended 6.3-by-6.3-metre (21 ft × 21 ft) square chancel. There was also a 2.5-by-3.8-metre (8 ft 2 in × 12 ft 6 in) church porch on the west end of the nave. The church building was owned by the King until 1724 when it was sold to Bent Uldrich for 70 rigsdaler. In 1860, the parish raised money and bought back the church for 5,755 speciedaler.

In the 1880s, it was decided to move the church to the nearby island of Stolmen to the south where it would be more accessible to the population of the parish. In addition to this, the new Storekalsøy Chapel was built in the north part of the archipelago. The new Møkster Church was built in 1892 by builder Mons Skare from Alversund Municipality and the architect Hans Jess from Bergen. The new church was consecrated on 29 June 1892. After the new church was completed, the old church was torn down. The old cemetery on Møkster island is still located on the old church site (in the 1980s, a small chapel was built on the site alongside the cemetery). Four stained glass windows from the 1686 church were saved and used in the present church on Stolmen.

In 2020, the Diocese of Bjørgvin approved a name change for the church. Historically, the church was known as Møkster Church since it originally was located on that island, but in 1892, the church was moved to the island of Stolmen. The church continued to be known as Møkster Church since it was the church for the Møkster parish. Many years later, the parishes in Austevoll municipality were merged into one parish known as Austevoll parish. Since the name Møkster was no longer the name of the parish or the location of the church, some began pushing for a name change. On 30 September 2020, the diocese approved renaming the church Stolmen Church (Nynorsk: Stolmen kyrkje).

== See also ==
- List of churches in Bjørgvin
