= Mjuken =

Mountain in Vestland, Norway

Mjuken Nuken

Highest point
- Elevation: 57 m (187 ft)
- Prominence: 57 m (187 ft)
- Isolation: 4 km (2.5 mi)
- Coordinates: 60.13776°N 5.07481°E

Geography
- Location: Vestland, Norway

Mjuken or Nuken is a hill on the island of Storakalsøy in Austevoll Municipality in Vestland county, Norway. The 57-metre (187 ft) tall hill sits in a rocky and mountainous area of the island and this particular peak is the highest point on the island. The village of Bakkasund lies south of the hill.

== See also ==
- List of mountains of Norway
