= Ostereidet Church =

Church in Vestland, Norway

- Ostereidet kyrkje
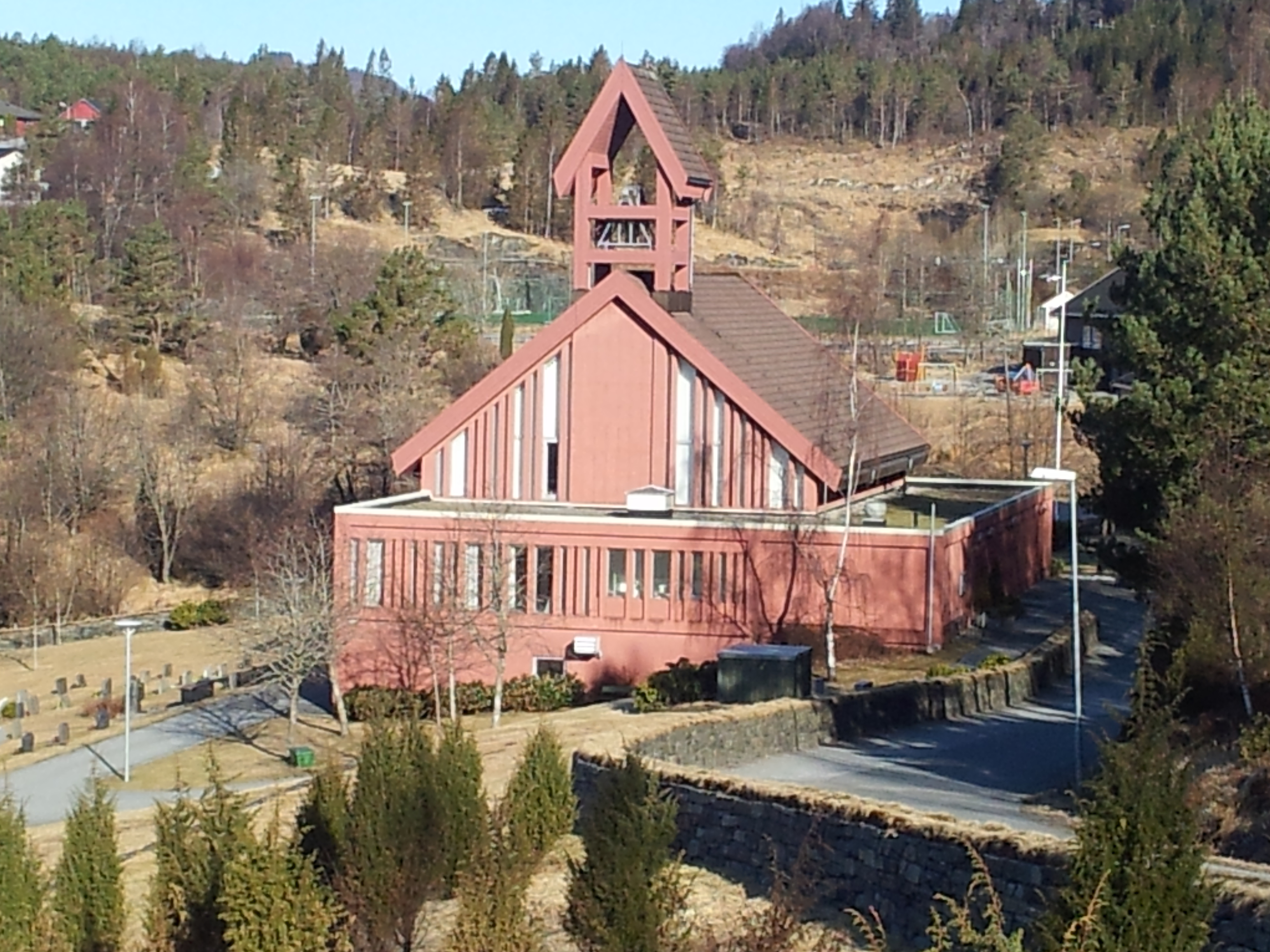
- View of the church
- Ostereidet Church
- 60°37′35″N 5°29′14″E
- Location: Alver Municipality, Vestland
- Country: Norway
- Denomination: Church of Norway
- Churchmanship: Evangelical Lutheran

History
- Status: Parish church
- Founded: 1988
- Consecrated: 18 December 1988

Architecture
- Functional status: Active
- Architect: Bengt Suleng
- Architectural type: Long church
- Completed: 1988 (38 years ago)

Specifications
- Capacity: 350
- Materials: Brick

Administration
- Diocese: Bjørgvin bispedømme
- Deanery: Nordhordland prosti
- Parish: Osterfjorden

Ostereidet Church (Norwegian: Ostereidet kyrkje) is a parish church of the Church of Norway in Alver Municipality in Vestland county, Norway. It is located in the village of Ostereidet. It is one of two churches for the Osterfjorden parish which is part of the Nordhordland prosti (deanery) in the Diocese of Bjørgvin. The red, brick church was built in a long church design in 1988 using plans drawn up by the architect Bengt Suleng who worked for the Einar Vaardal-Lunde architectural firm. The church seats about 350 people. The church was consecrated on 18 December 1988.

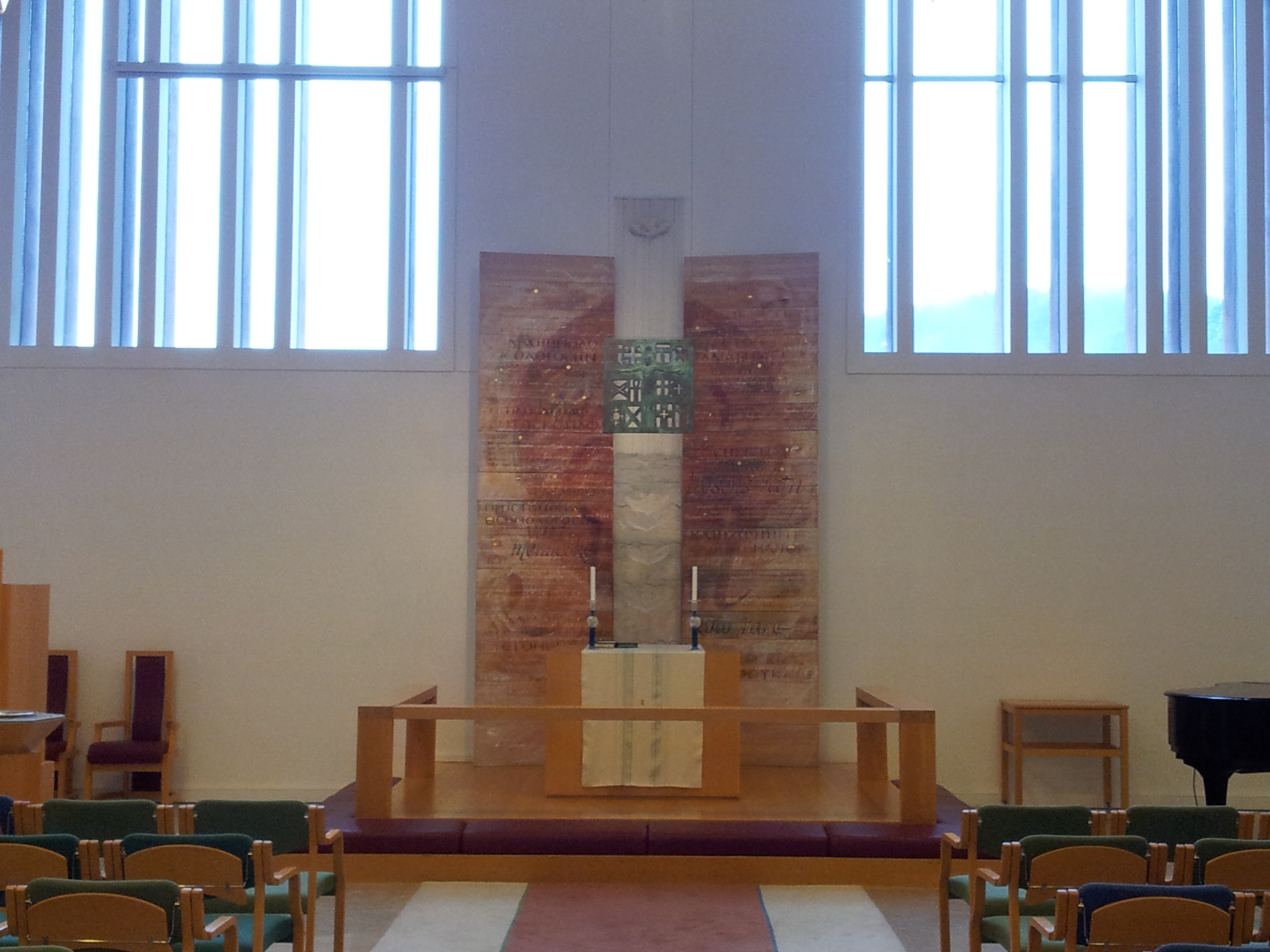
Altar table

== See also ==
- List of churches in Bjørgvin
