= Storakalsøy =

Island in Vestland, Norway

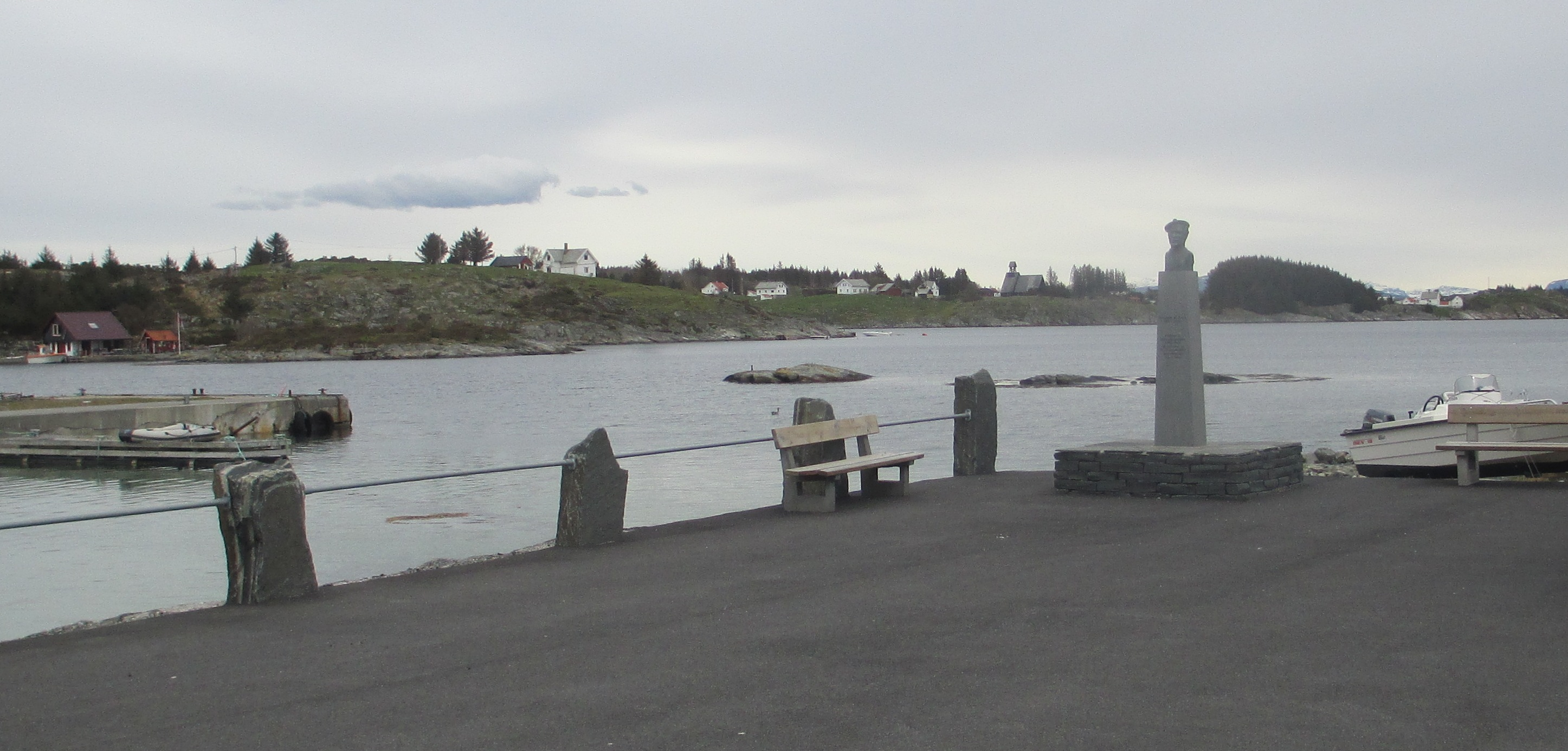
- View of Stora Kalsøy
- Interactive map of Storakalsøy

Geography
- Location: Vestland, Norway
- Coordinates: 60.1320°N 5.0653°E
- Archipelago: Austevoll
- Area: 6 km^{2} (2.3 sq mi)
- Length: 2.8 km (1.74 mi)
- Width: 3.2 km (1.99 mi)
- Highest elevation: 57 m (187 ft)
- Highest point: Mjuken

Administration
- Norway
- County: Vestland
- Municipality: Austevoll Municipality

Demographics
- Population: 167 (2007)
- Pop. density: 27/km^{2} (70/sq mi)

Storakalsøy is an island in Austevoll Municipality in Vestland county, Norway. The 6-square-kilometre (2.3 sq mi) island lies northwest of the larger island of Hundvåko and just east of the Marstein Lighthouse. The northern part of the island is very rocky and mountainous. The highest point is the 57-metre (187 ft) tall mountain Mjuken. The smaller islands of Nautøya and Spissøya lies just east of Storakalsøy. The smaller islands of Horgo, Møkster, and Litlakalsøy lie to the south of Storakalsøy.

Virtually all the residents live along the southern and eastern coastline of the island. The main population centre of Storakalsøy is the village of Bakkasund where the Store-Kalsøy Chapel is located. The island had 167 inhabitants in 2001.

== See also ==
- List of islands of Norway
