= Vike Church (Vestland) =

Church in Vestland, Norway

- Vike kyrkje
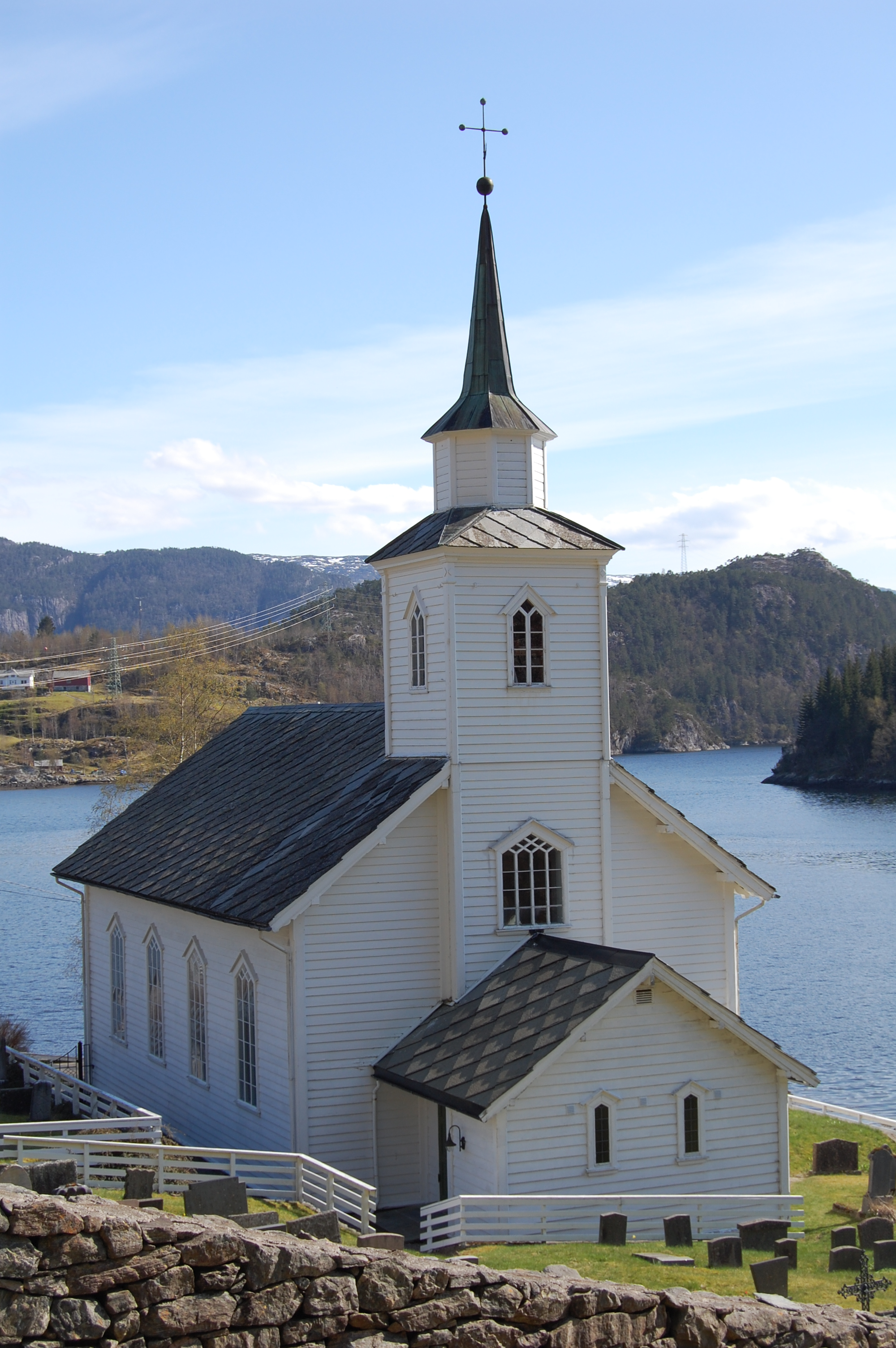
- View of the church
- Vike Church
- 60°41′55″N 5°35′07″E
- Location: Alver Municipality, Vestland
- Country: Norway
- Denomination: Church of Norway
- Churchmanship: Evangelical Lutheran

History
- Former name: Vike kapell
- Status: Parish church
- Founded: 1891
- Consecrated: 2 December 1891

Architecture
- Functional status: Active
- Architect: Johannes Øvsthus
- Architectural type: Rectangular
- Completed: 1891 (135 years ago)

Specifications
- Capacity: 200
- Materials: Wood

Administration
- Diocese: Bjørgvin bispedømme
- Deanery: Nordhordland prosti
- Parish: Osterfjorden
- Norwegian Cultural Heritage Site
- Type: Church
- Status: Not protected
- ID: 85836

Vike Church (Norwegian: Vike kyrkje) is a parish church of the Church of Norway in Alver Municipality in Vestland county, Norway. It is located in the village of Vikanes, along the Romarheimsfjorden. It is one of two churches in the Osterfjorden parish which is part of the Nordhordland prosti (deanery) in the Diocese of Bjørgvin. The white, wooden church was built in a rectangular design in 1891 using plans drawn up by the architect Johannes Øvsthus. The church seats about 200 people.

== History ==
In 1875, a cemetery was built in Vikanes. Soon after, people began asking for a chapel to be built by the cemetery. Around 1890, plans were made to build a chapel at the site. The parish hired Johannes Øvsthus to design the building and Askild S. Heldal was hired as the lead builder. The church was completed and consecrated in 1891. In 1951, the church received electricity for light and heat. It was renovated in 1967 under the direction of architect Claus Lindstrøm. Then in 1991, under the direction of architect Einar Vaardal-Lunde, the church was renovated again, this time the church porch was rebuilt as well.

== Media gallery ==
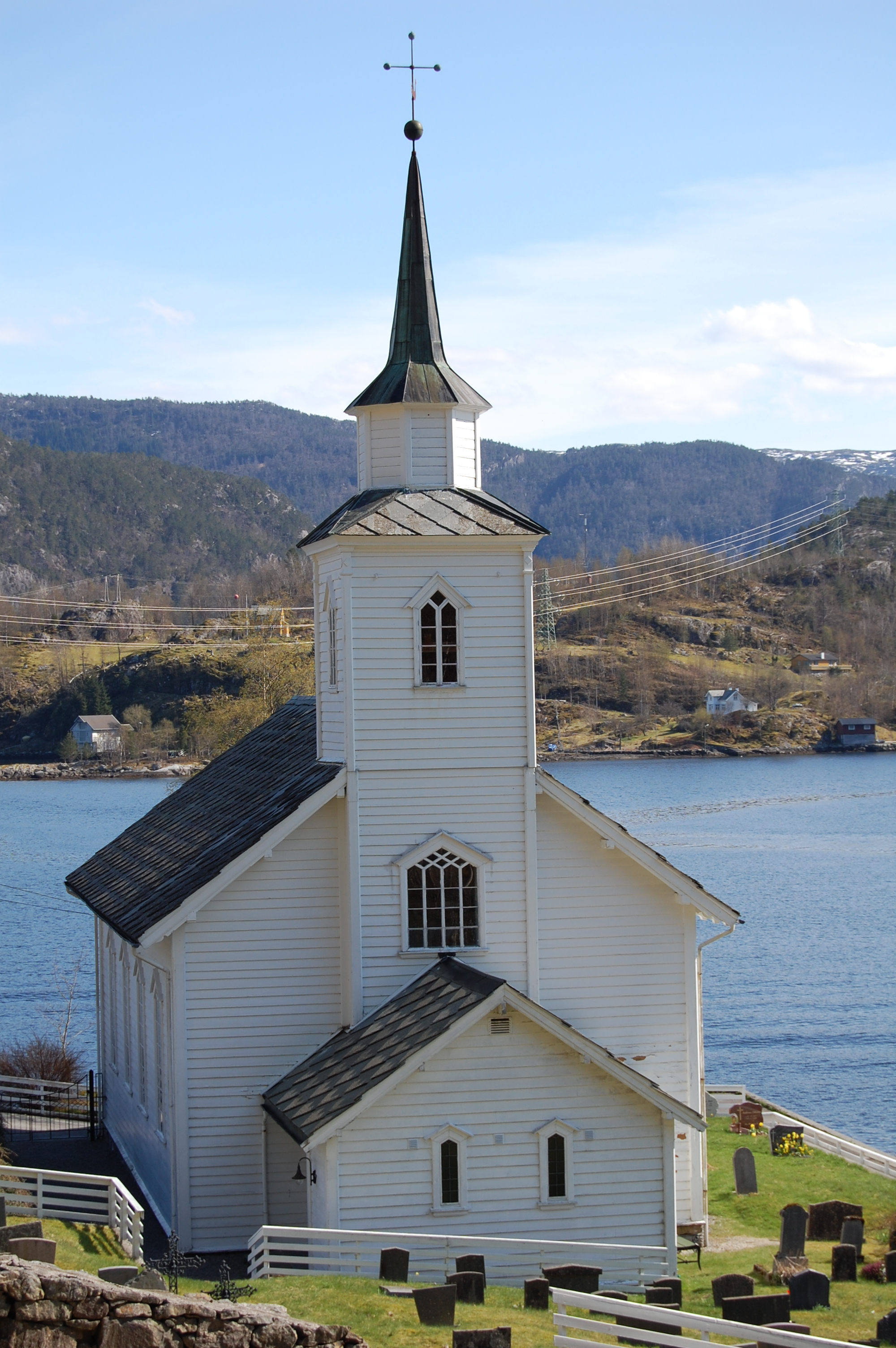

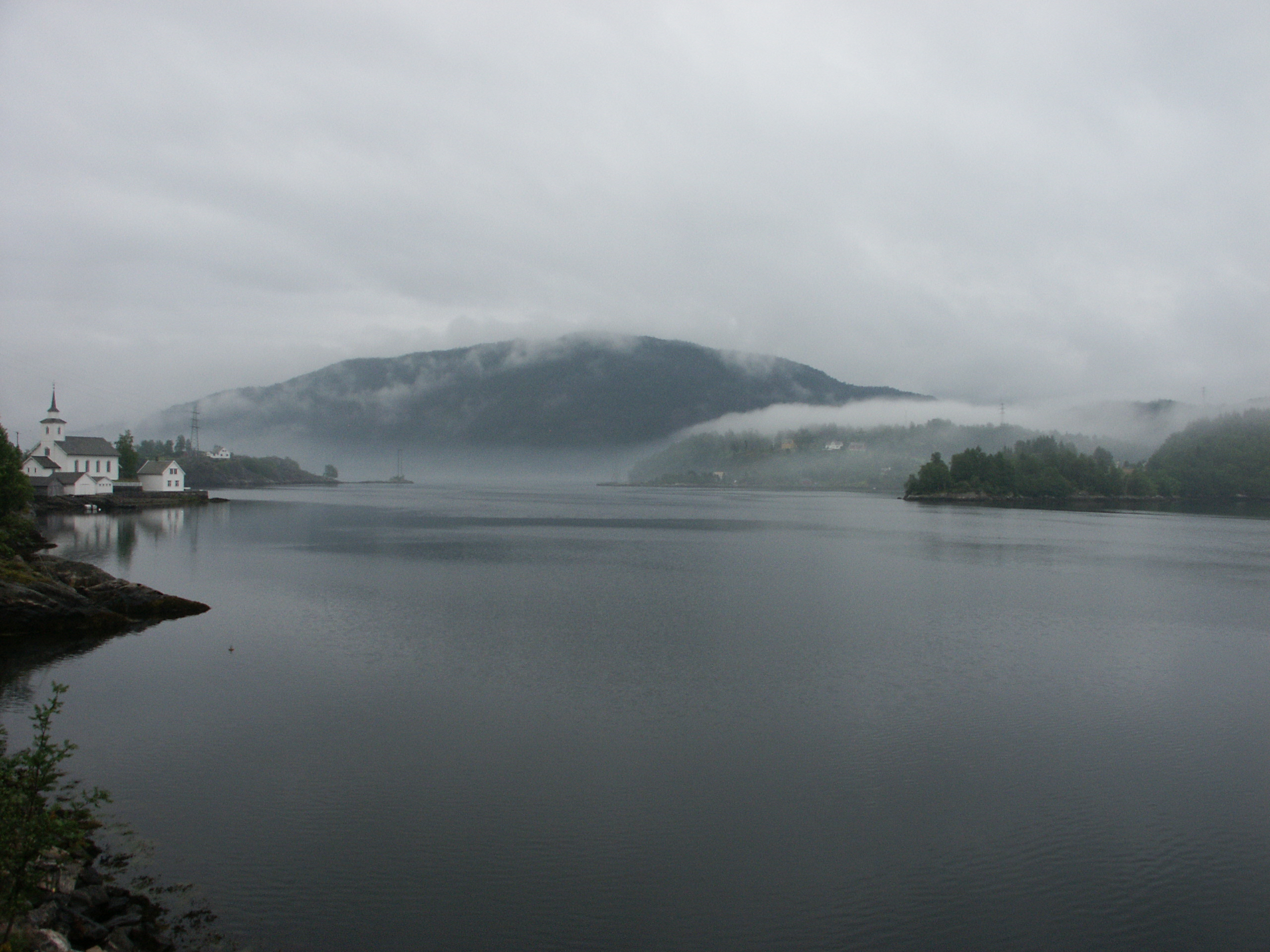

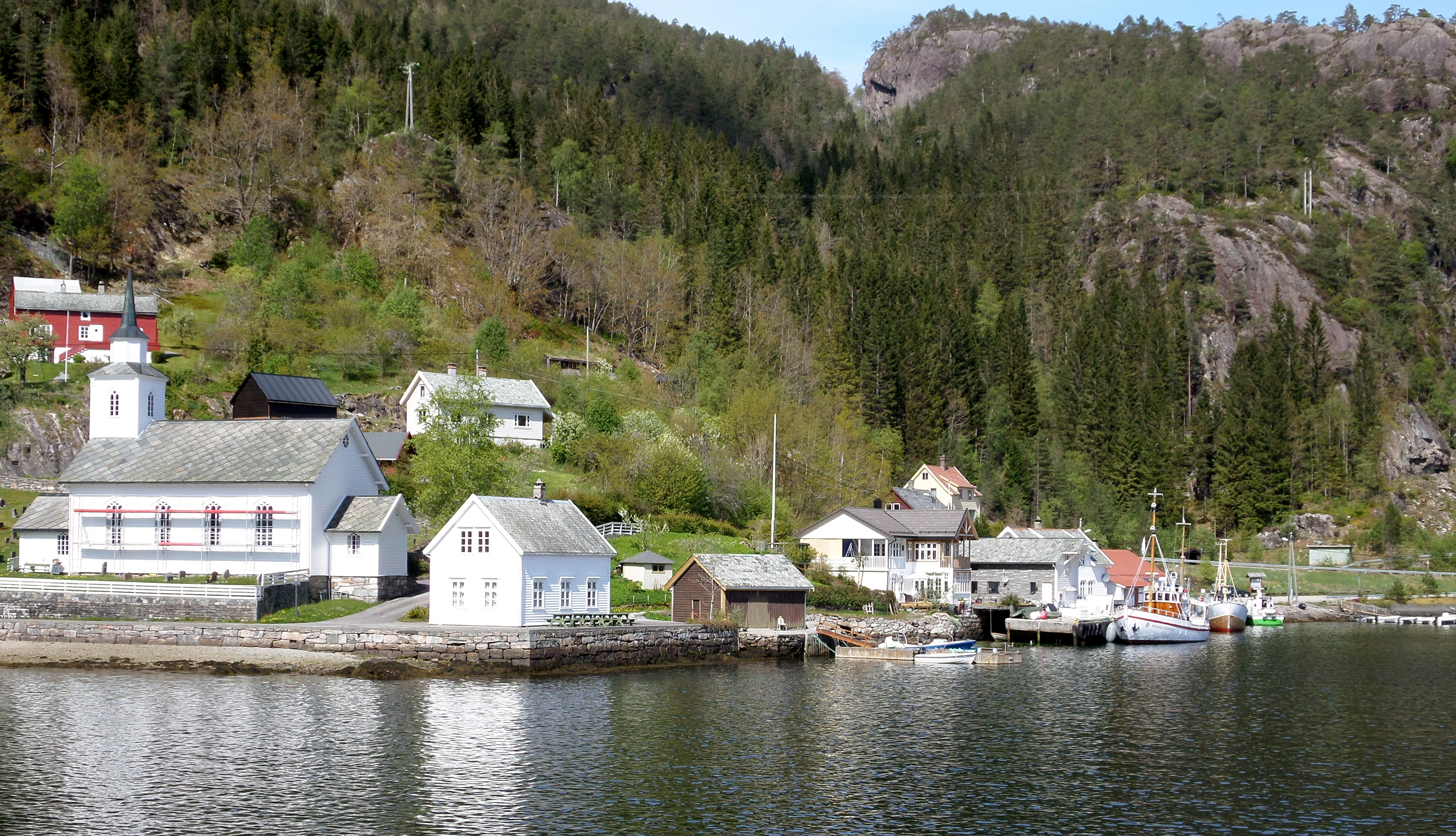

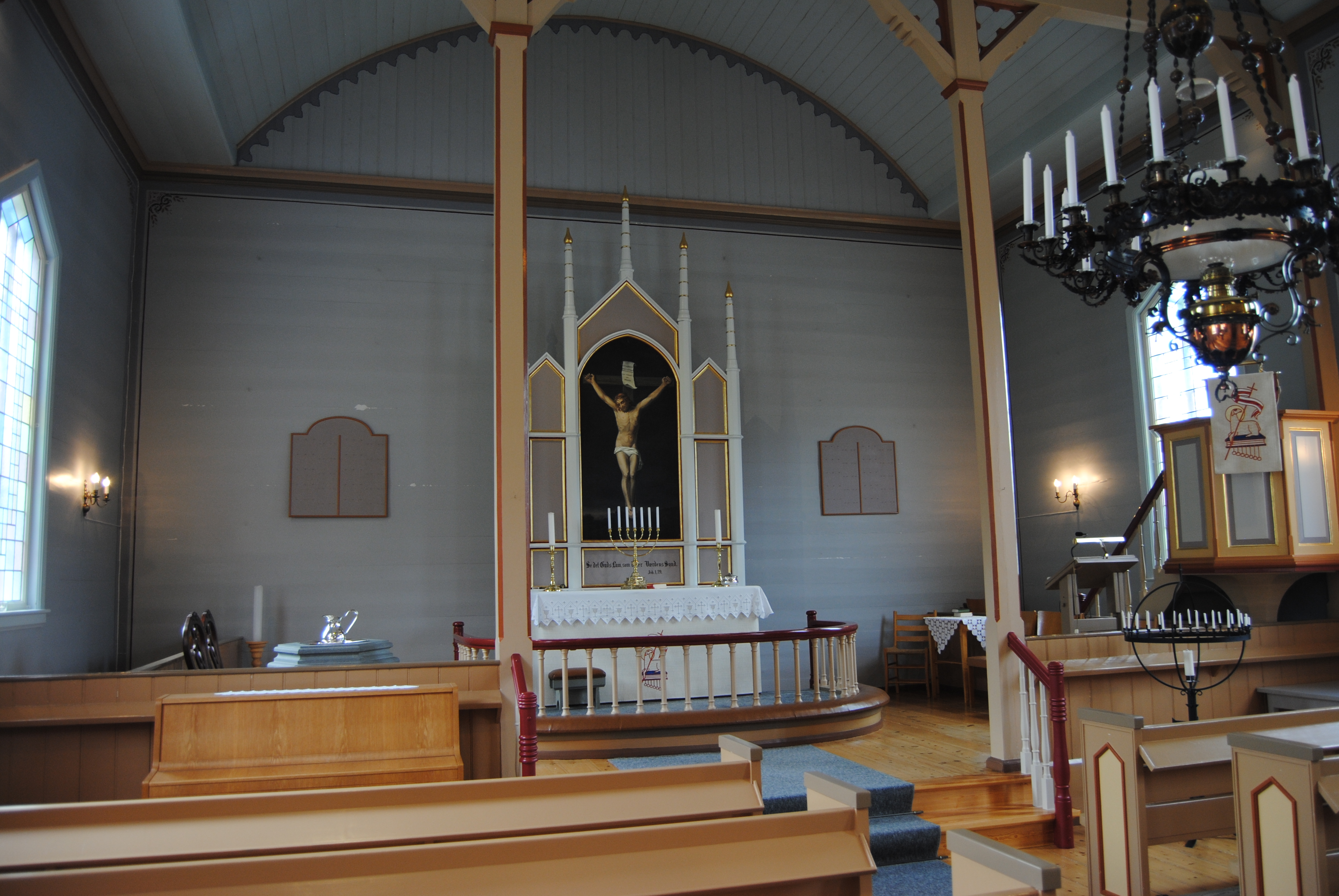

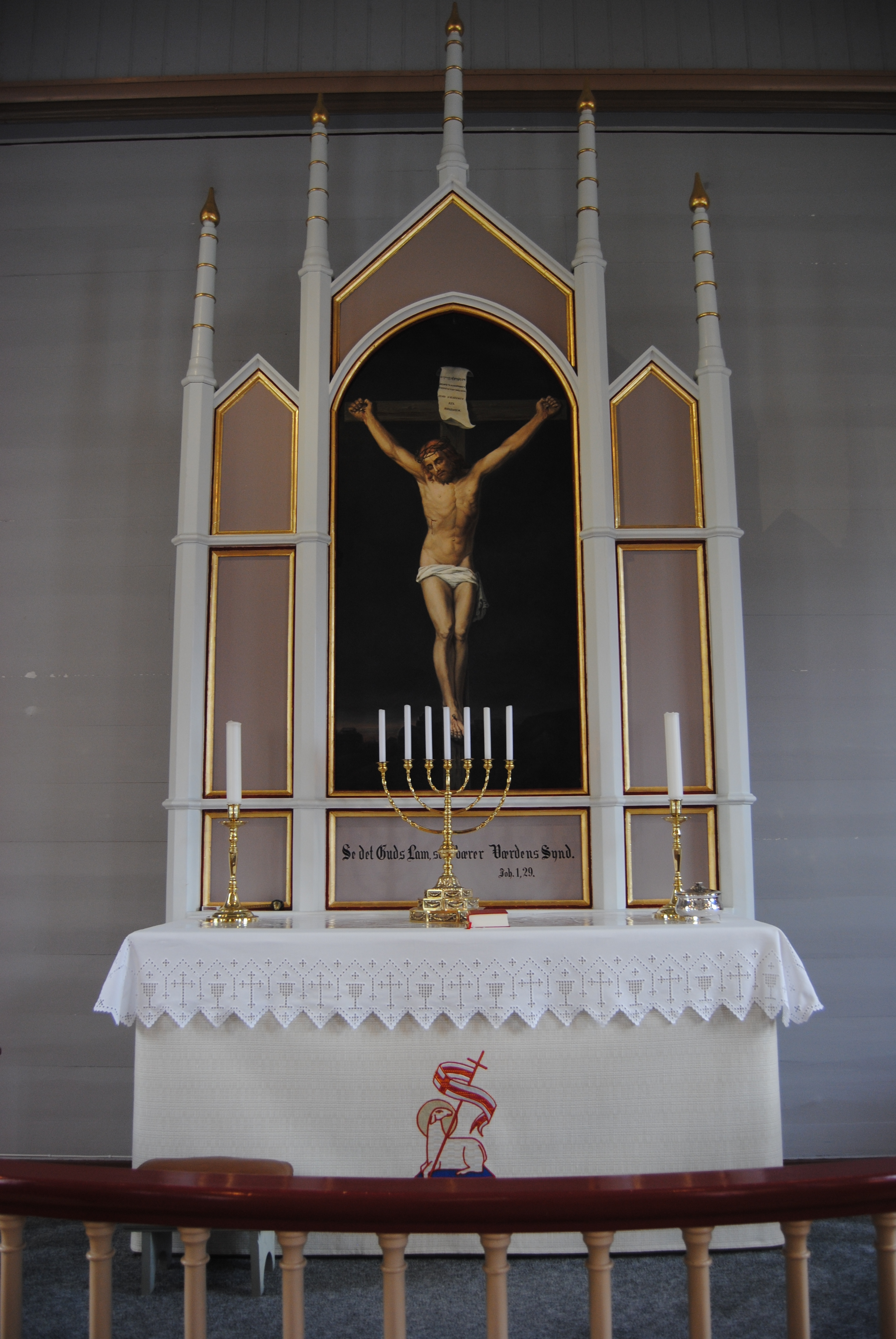

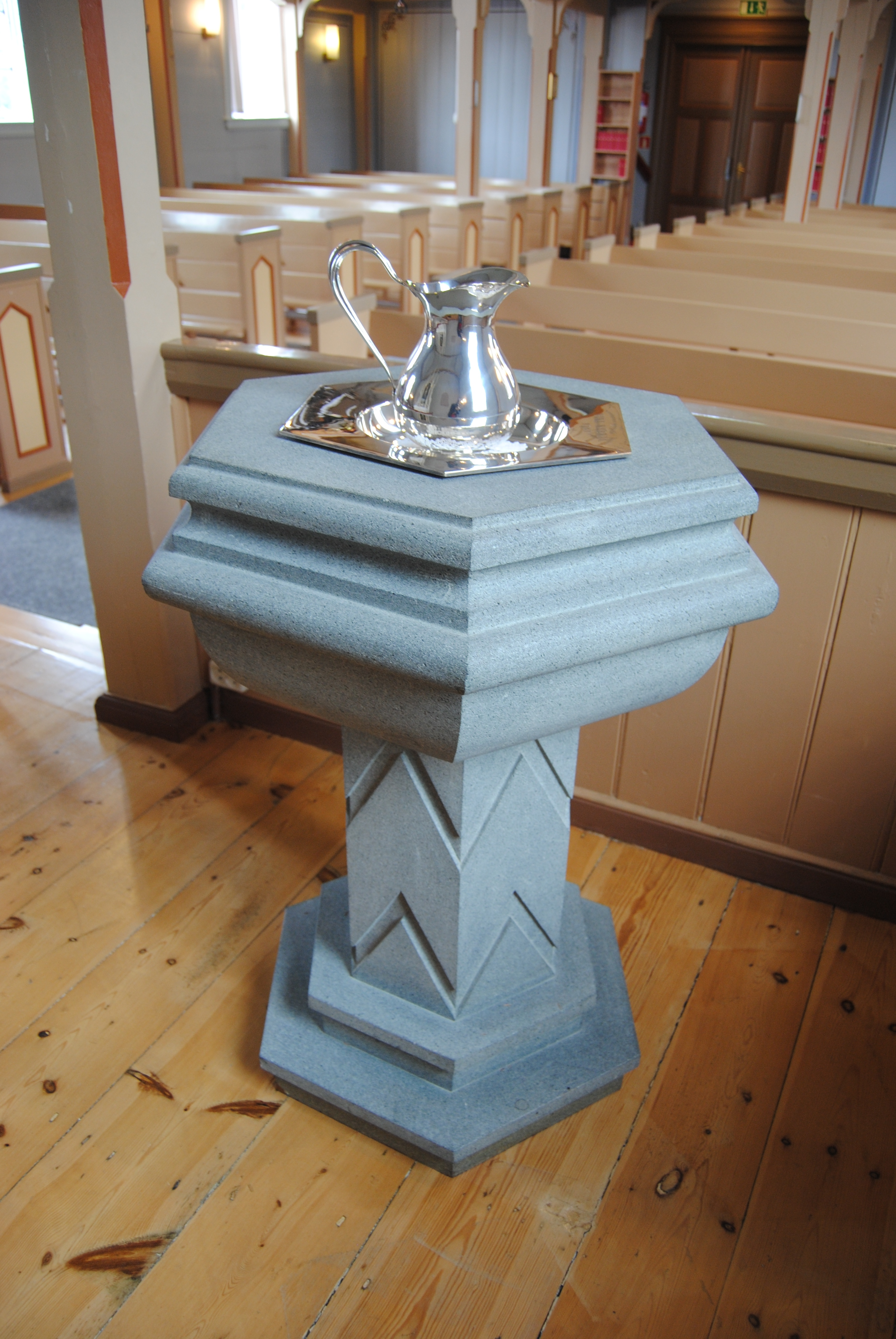

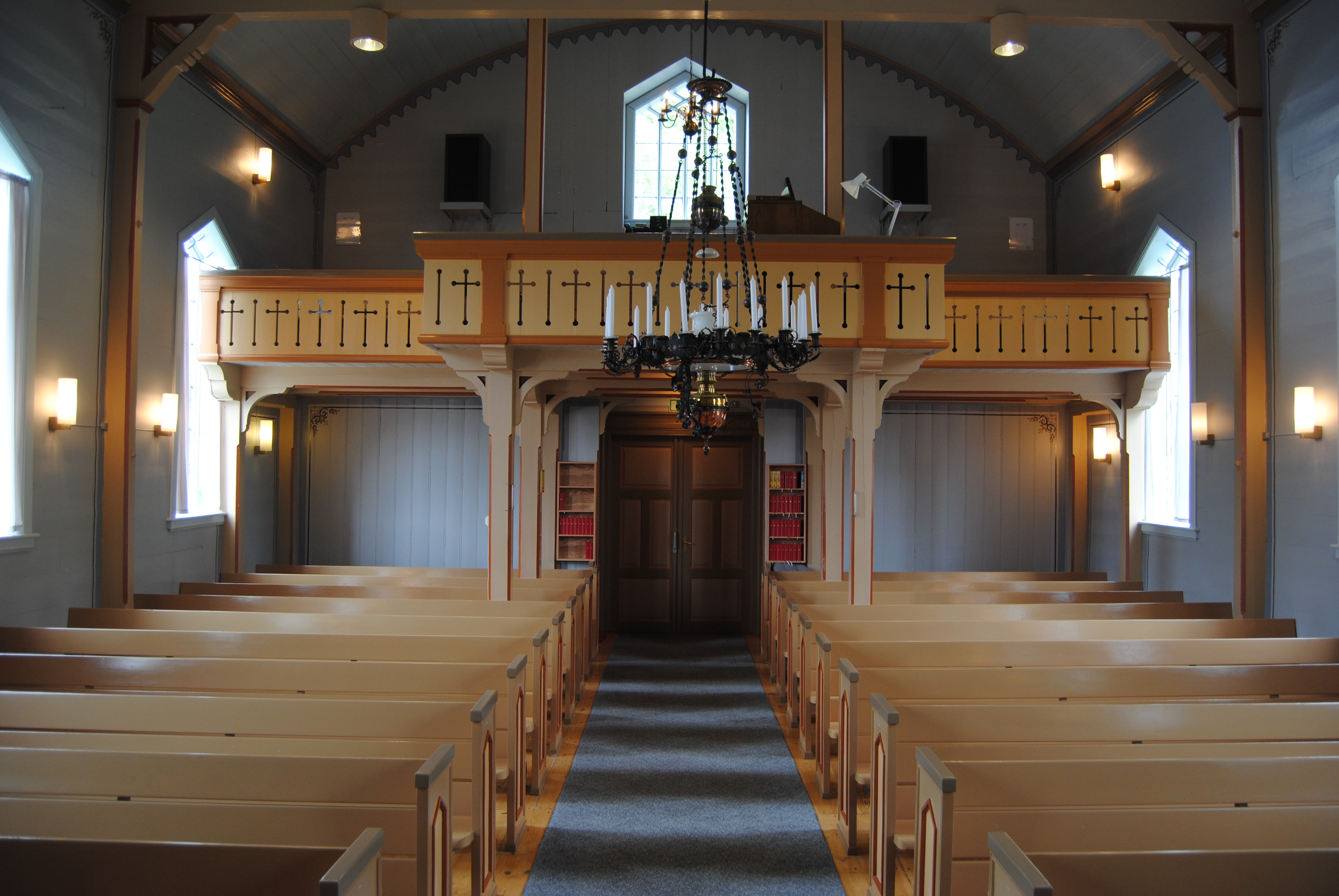

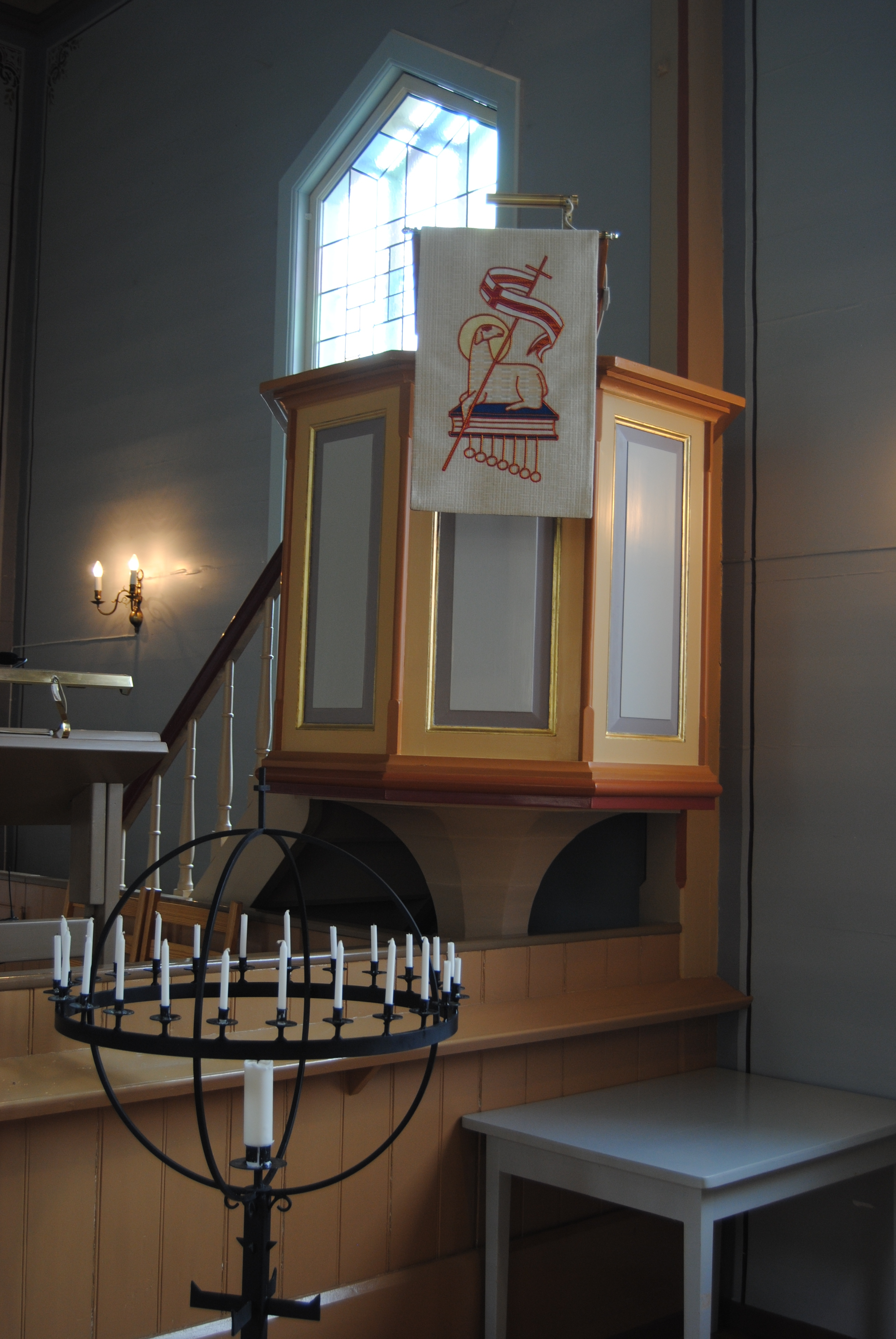

== See also ==
- List of churches in Bjørgvin
