= Storekalsøy Chapel =

Church in Vestland, Norway

- Storekalsøy kapell
- Storekalsøy Chapel
- 60°07′38″N 5°04′45″E
- Location: Austevoll Municipality, Vestland
- Country: Norway
- Denomination: Church of Norway
- Churchmanship: Evangelical Lutheran

History
- Status: Parish church
- Founded: 1892
- Consecrated: 19 Dec 1976
- Events: Fire: 18 Sept 1974

Architecture
- Functional status: Active
- Architect: Einar Vaardal-Lunde
- Architectural type: Long church
- Completed: 1975 (51 years ago)

Specifications
- Capacity: 250
- Materials: Wood

Administration
- Diocese: Bjørgvin bispedømme
- Deanery: Fana prosti
- Parish: Austevoll
- Norwegian Cultural Heritage Site
- Type: Church
- Status: Not listed
- ID: 85580

Storekalsøy Chapel (Norwegian: Storekalsøy kapell or Store-Kalsøy kapell) is a parish church of the Church of Norway in Austevoll Municipality in Vestland county, Norway. It is located in the village of Bakkasund on the island of Storekalsøy in the northwestern part of the municipality. It is one of the five churches for the Austevoll parish which is part of the Fana prosti (deanery) in the Diocese of Bjørgvin. The brown, wooden church was built in a long church design in 1975 using plans drawn up by the architect Einar Vaardal-Lunde from Bergen. The church seats about 250 people.

== History ==
The people of Storekalsøy island petitioned for a chapel on the island in the 1880s. In 1889, the parish decided to move the centrally located Møkster Church to a new site further south and that a new annex chapel would be built on Storekalsøy in the north. The new chapel was designed by Hans Heinrich Jess from the nearby city of Bergen. The new building had a long church design, based on the plans for the nearby Austevoll Church. The church was built in 1892 and it was consecrated on 30 June 1892. That chapel burned down on 18 September 1974. A new chapel was immediately commissioned and it was completed in 1975 on a site a little east of the old chapel. The new, brown, wooden church was designed by Einar Vaardal-Lunde and it was consecrated on 19 December 1976. The church seats about 250 people.

== See also ==
- List of churches in Bjørgvin
