= Fjell Church =

Church in Vestland, Norway

- Fjell kyrkje
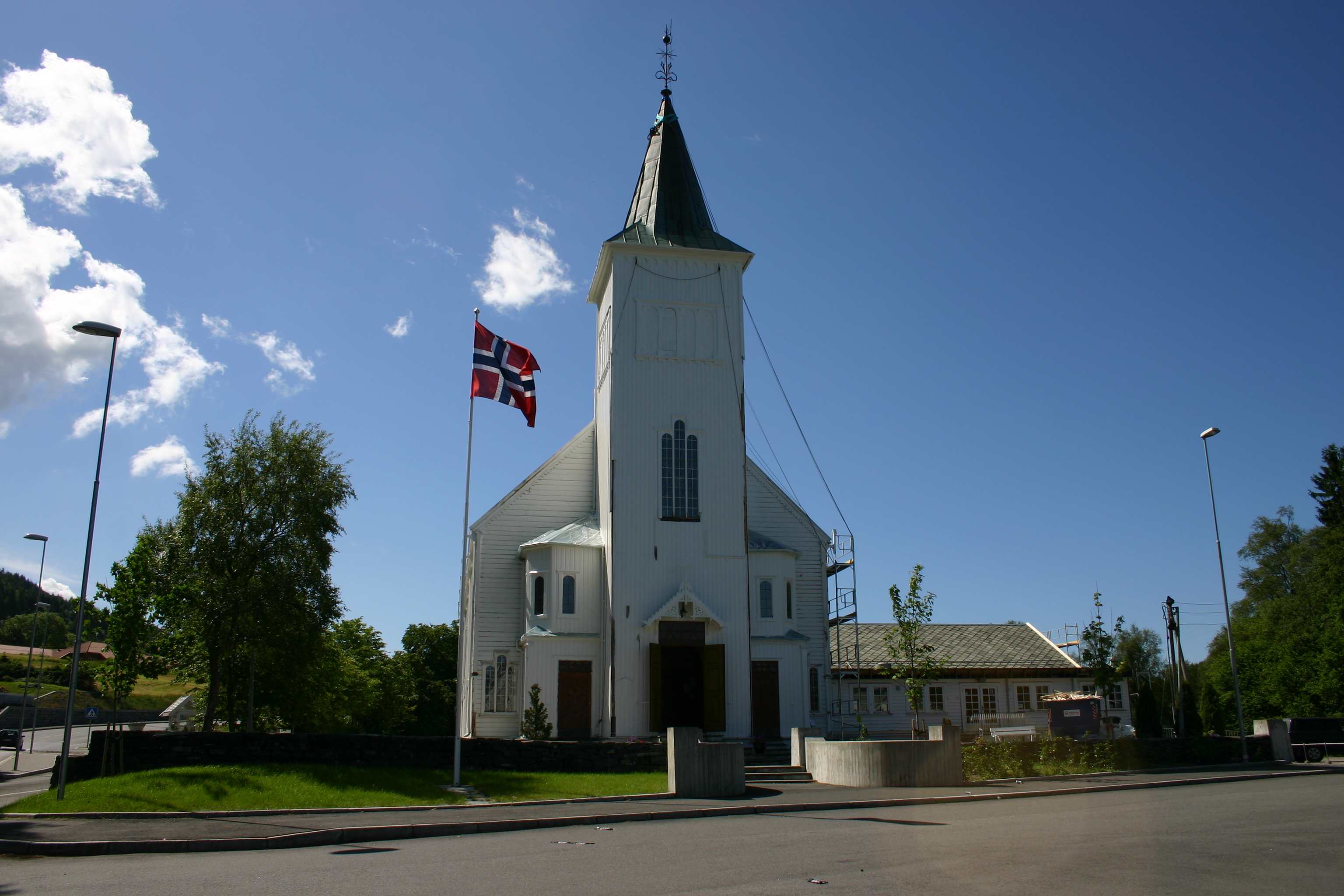
- View of the church
- Fjell Church
- 60°19′51″N 5°04′33″E
- Location: Øygarden Municipality, Vestland
- Country: Norway
- Denomination: Church of Norway
- Previous denomination: Catholic Church
- Churchmanship: Evangelical Lutheran

History
- Status: Parish church
- Founded: 13th century
- Consecrated: 28 August 1874

Architecture
- Functional status: Active
- Architect: C.F. von der Lippe
- Architectural type: Long church
- Completed: 1874 (152 years ago)

Specifications
- Capacity: 700
- Materials: Wood

Administration
- Diocese: Bjørgvin bispedømme
- Deanery: Vesthordland prosti
- Parish: Fjell
- Norwegian Cultural Heritage Site
- Type: Church
- Status: Listed
- ID: 84147

Fjell Church (Norwegian: Fjell kyrkje) is a parish church of the Church of Norway in Øygarden Municipality in Vestland county, Norway. It is located in the village of Fjell on the island of Sotra. It is one of the three churches for the Fjell parish which is part of the Vesthordland prosti (deanery) in the Diocese of Bjørgvin. The white, wooden church was built in a long church design in 1874 using plans drawn up by the architect Conrad Fredrik von der Lippe. The church seats about 700 people.

== History ==
The earliest existing historical records of the church date back to the year 1330, but the church was not new that year. The first church at Fjell was a wooden stave church that was likely built during the 13th century. That church stood about 40 metres (130 ft) south of the present church site. Sometime during the 1600s, but before 1686, the old medieval church was torn down. A new timber-framed long church was built on the same site to replace it. In 1725, the church was sold into private ownership. The new owner was Abraham Wessel from Bergen. In 1795, the old nave was torn down and a new nave was rebuilt on the same site. (An alternate theory mentioned in one source is that the church was only renovated in the 1600s, and that the stave church was torn down and replaced in 1795.)

Ownership of the church changed hands several times over the years and in 1869, the church was sold back to the parish by the Krohn family. Shortly thereafter, in 1871, the parish decided that the present church was too small and it needed to replace that church. In 1874, a new church was built about 40 metres (130 ft) to the north of the old church. The new church was designed by the architect Conrad Fredrik von der Lippe and Ole Syslak from Lindaas Municipality was hired as the lead builder for the project. The new church was consecrated on 28 August 1874. About one year after the new church was completed, the old church was torn down and that area was turned into a cemetery. In 1971–1972, a large wing was built to the west of the nave which houses a parish hall. This addition was designed by Torgeir Alvsaker and Einar Vaardal-Lunde.

== Media gallery ==
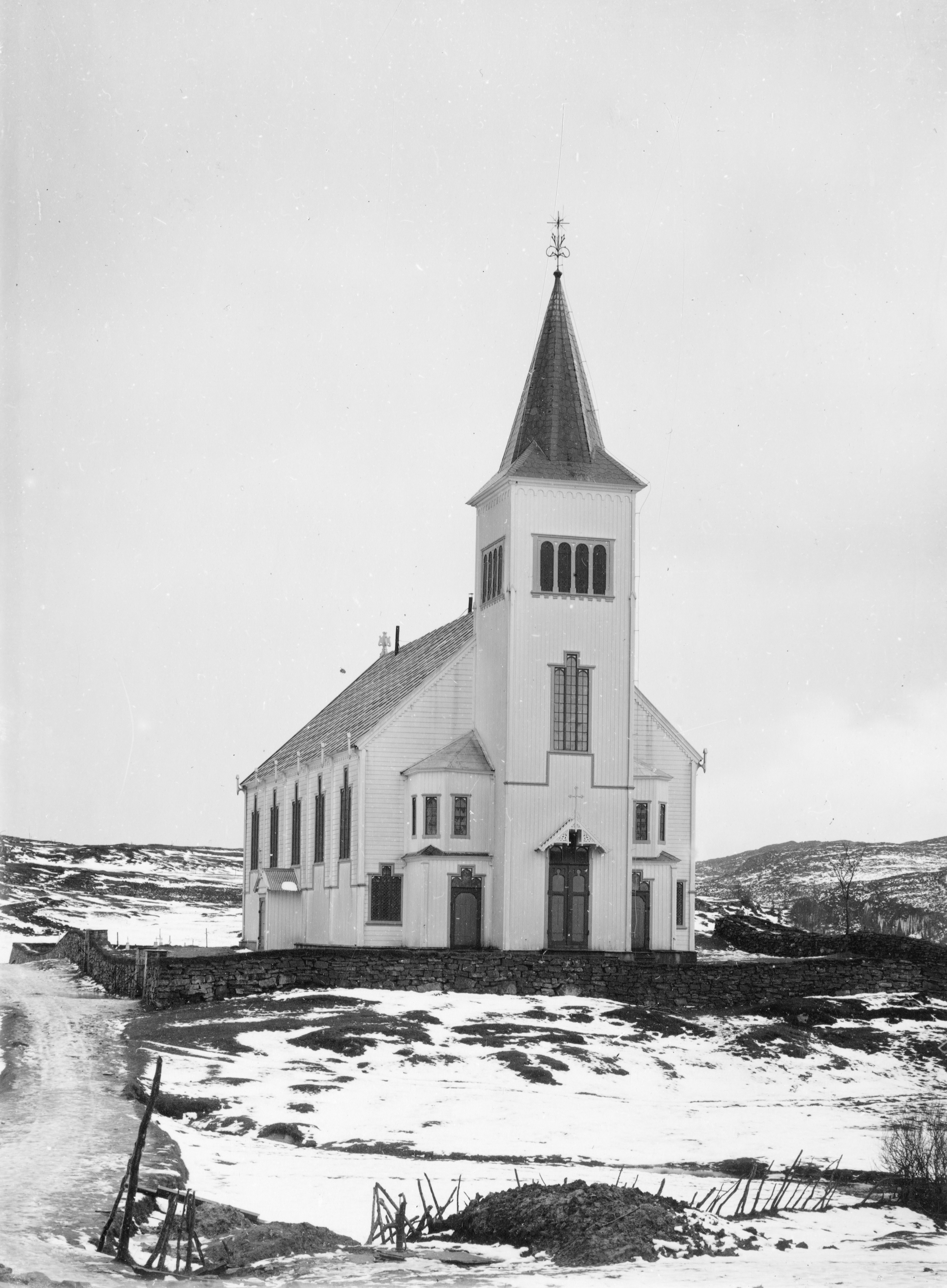
Exterior of the church

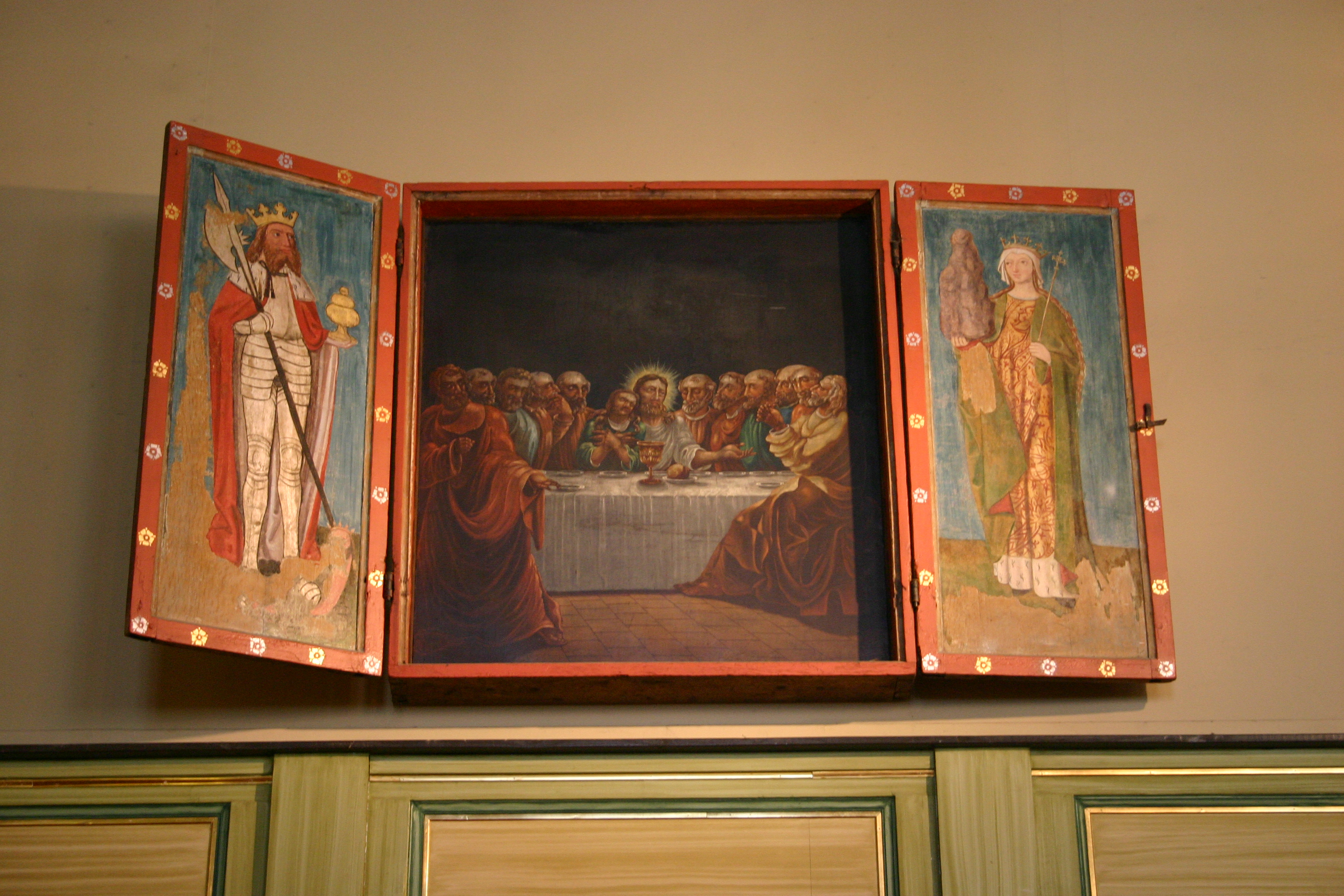
Altarpiece

== See also ==
- List of churches in Bjørgvin
