= Nygård Church =

Church in Vestland, Norway

- Nygård kirke
- Nygård Church
- 60°23′14″N 5°16′28″E
- Location: Bergen, Vestland
- Country: Norway
- Denomination: Church of Norway
- Churchmanship: Evangelical Lutheran

History
- Status: Parish church
- Founded: 1972
- Consecrated: 8 Oct 1972

Architecture
- Functional status: Active
- Architect: Einar Vaardal-Lunde
- Architectural type: Fan-shaped
- Groundbreaking: 29 Nov 1970
- Completed: 1972 (54 years ago)

Specifications
- Capacity: 520
- Materials: Brick

Administration
- Diocese: Bjørgvin bispedømme
- Deanery: Bergen domprosti
- Parish: Nygård
- Norwegian Cultural Heritage Site
- Type: Church
- Status: Listed by municipality
- ID: 85181

Nygård Church (Norwegian: Nygård kirke) is a parish church of the Church of Norway in Bergen Municipality in Vestland county, Norway. It is located in the Gravdal neighborhood in the city of Bergen. It is the church for the Nygård parish which is part of the Bergen domprosti (arch-deanery) in the Diocese of Bjørgvin. The white, brick church was built in a fan-shaped design in 1972 using plans drawn up by the architect Arvid Jacobson from the firm of Einar Vaardal-Lunde. The church seats about 520 people.

== History ==
A new cemetery at Nygård in the Gravdal neighborhood in Bergen was inaugurated in December 1876. Immediately after World War II, planning for a church at the cemetery site began. The parish hired Einar Vaardal-Lunde in 1954 to design the new church. However, the economy put an end to these plans for some time. People continued to push for a new church in Nygård, so in 1962, approval was given for the new church. In 1967, the neighboring plot of land next to the cemetery was purchased. The designs for the church made by the Vaardal-Lunde company from the 1950s were used. The foundation stone was laid on 29 November 1970 and the church was consecrated on 8 October 1972. On 1 January 1973, Nygård became a separate parish.

== See also ==
- List of churches in Bjørgvin
