= Torgeir Alvsaker =

Norwegian architect

- Born: 9 February 1875; Kinsarvik Municipality, Norway
- Died: 27 November 1971 (aged 96); Bergen, Norway
- Occupation: Architect

Torgeir Alvsaker (1875—1971) was a Norwegian architect.

Alvsaker was born 9 February 1875 on the Alvsaker farm in Kinsarvik Municipality, Norway. He attended the Bergen Technical School and graduated in 1898. He then became an assistant to architect Adolph Fischer in Bergen and then for the architect Holger Sinding-Larsen in Oslo. From 1905 until 1916 he also worked as an architect in the United States. In 1916, he returned to Bergen where he set up his own architecture company. From 1948 to 1969, Alvsaker worked in partnership with architect Einar Vaardal-Lunde, also based in Bergen. He died on 27 November 1971 in Bergen, Norway.

In addition to designing houses in residential areas mostly in and around Bergen, he also designed several farm buildings, hospitals, old people's homes, schools, hotels, museums, and churches, working mainly in Western Norway.

== Works ==
- Strusshamn Church (1969)
- Brandasund Chapel (1960)
- Værlandet Chapel (1960)
- Tveit Church (1957)
- Bleikvassli Church (1955)
- Elsfjord Church (1955)
- Solfonn Hotell, Odda (1953)
- Haukås School, Bergen (1940)
- Sagvåg School, Stord (1940)
- Ullensvang Hotel, Hardanger (1938)
- Førde Church (1938)
- Reksteren Church (1937)
- Vikebygd Church (1937)
- Vikinghallen, Bergen (1935)
- Berjaflot Chapel (1934)
- Ingebrigt Vik Museum, Kvam (1934)
- Solhov Folk high school, Lyngen (1924)
- Tyssedal School (1919)
