= Fjell skole =

School in Drammen, Norway

Coordinates: 59°43′12″N 10°13′24″E

Fjell Skole is a school located in Fjell, Drammen, Norway. 77% of the students are from a minority background. The school also runs classes for immigrants to the Drammen area.

In 2008, the school was awarded the Humanistprisen from the Human-Etisk Forbund for "its work in anti-racism, friendship between nationalities, and its mind-changing work". In 2003, it was awarded the Benjamin Prize for its work against racism.

Preceded by Bernt Hagtvet	Winner of the Humanistprisen; 2008	Succeeded by Dag Olav Hessen
