= Fjell (village) =

Village in Øygarden Municipality, Norway

- Village
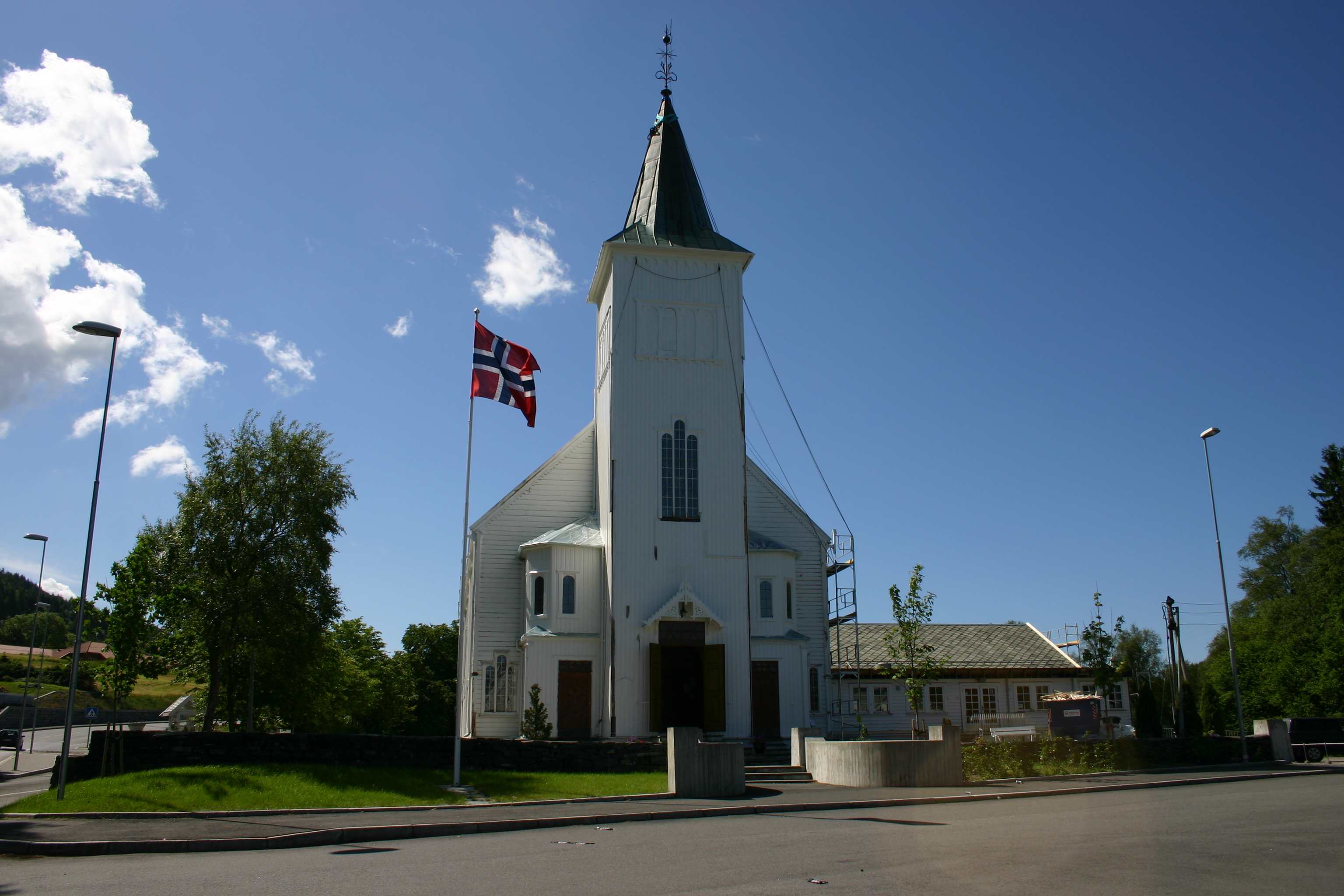
- View of the village church, Fjell Church
- Interactive map of Fjell
- Coordinates: 60.33039°N 5.07635°E
- Country: Norway
- Region: Western Norway
- County: Vestland
- District: Midhordland
- Municipality: Øygarden Municipality

Area
  - Total: 0.37 km^{2} (0.14 sq mi)
- Elevation: 21 m (69 ft)

Population (2025)
  - Total: 609
  - Density: 1,646/km^{2} (4,260/sq mi)
- Time zone: UTC+01:00 (CET)
  - Summer (DST): UTC+02:00 (CEST)
- Post Code: 5357 Fjell

Fjell is a village in Øygarden Municipality in Vestland county, Norway. It is located in the central part of the island of Sotra, about 3 kilometres (1.9 mi) southwest of the neighboring village of Kolltveit. The village is the site of Fjell Church.

The 0.37-square-kilometre (91-acre) village has a population (2025) of 609 and a population density of 1,646 inhabitants per square kilometre (4,260/sq mi).
