= Masfjorden =

Masfjorden or Masfjord may refer to:

== Places ==
- Masfjorden Municipality, a municipality in Vestland county, Norway
- Masfjorden (fjord), a fjord within Masfjorden Municipality in Vestland county, Norway
- Masfjorden Church, an alternate name for Sandnes Church, a church in Masfjorden Municipality in Vestland county, Norway

== Other ==
- Masfjord FL, an association football team based in Masfjorden Municipality in Vestland county, Norway
