= Hosteland =

Village in Masfjorden Municipality, Norway

- Village
- Interactive map of Hosteland
- Coordinates: 60.83524°N 5.25831°E
- Country: Norway
- Region: Western Norway
- County: Vestland
- District: Nordhordland
- Municipality: Masfjorden Municipality
- Elevation: 35 m (115 ft)
- Time zone: UTC+01:00 (CET)
  - Summer (DST): UTC+02:00 (CEST)
- Post Code: 5986 Hosteland

Hosteland is a village in Masfjorden Municipality in Vestland county, Norway. The coastal village is located on a small bay off the main Fensfjorden. It is located about 5 kilometres (3.1 mi) north of the village of Masfjordnes, about 15 kilometres (9.3 mi) southwest of the village of Solheim, and about 10 kilometres (6.2 mi) southeast of the village of Halsvika (in neighboring Gulen Municipality).

The Frøyset Church is located about 5 kilometres (3.1 mi) to the northwest of the village of Hosteland. The road heading north from Hosteland leads to the village of Brekke in Gulen Municipality, about 25 kilometres (16 mi) away.
