= Solheim Church (Masfjorden) =

Church in Vestland, Norway

- Solheim kyrkje
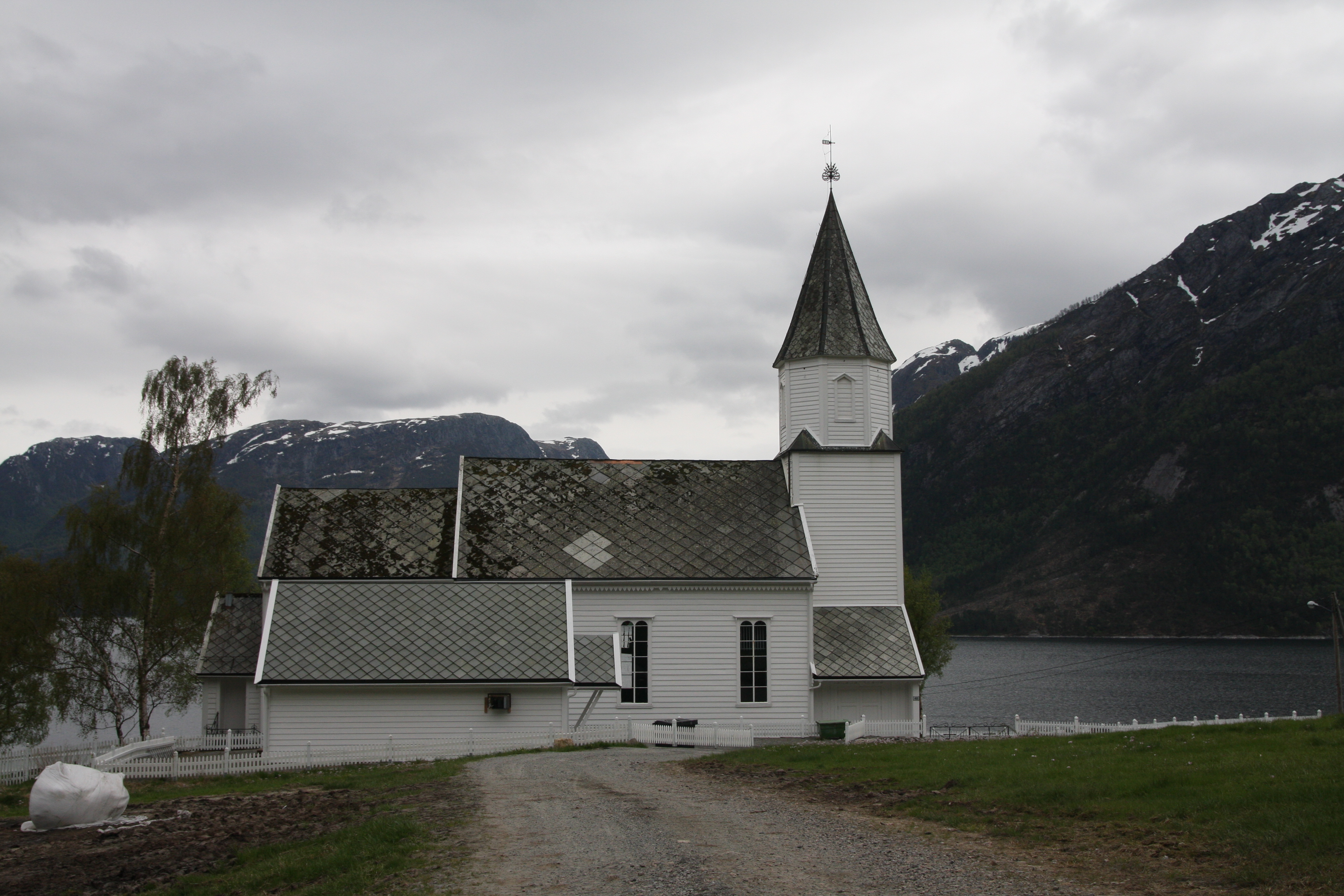
- View of the church
- Solheim Church
- 60°53′17″N 5°27′53″E
- Location: Masfjorden, Vestland
- Country: Norway
- Denomination: Church of Norway
- Churchmanship: Evangelical Lutheran

History
- Status: Parish church
- Founded: 1882
- Consecrated: 24 March 1882

Architecture
- Functional status: Active
- Architect: Ole Syslak
- Architectural type: Long church
- Completed: 1882 (144 years ago)

Specifications
- Capacity: 200
- Materials: Wood

Administration
- Diocese: Bjørgvin bispedømme
- Deanery: Nordhordland prosti
- Parish: Masfjorden
- Norwegian Cultural Heritage Site
- Type: Church
- Status: Not protected
- ID: 85513

Solheim Church (Norwegian: Solheim kyrkje) is a parish church of the Church of Norway in Masfjorden Municipality in Vestland county, Norway. It is located in the village of Solheim, along the shore of the Masfjorden. It is the church for the Masfjorden parish which is part of the Nordhordland prosti (deanery) in the Diocese of Bjørgvin. The white, wooden church was built in a long church design in 1882 using plans drawn up by the architect Ole Syslak. The church seats about 200 people and it serves the eastern part of the municipality.

== History ==
The people of the eastern part of Masfjorden Municipality had long desired a church of their own due to the long journey to their parish church, Sandnes Church. The new church was designed by Ole Syslak who also led the construction. The parish also credits Jacob Wilhelm Nordan as helping with the design. Nordan was an architect and the church ministry's consultant in construction matters. Presumably Nordan corrected parts of Syslak's drawings. The church was consecrated on 24 March 1882 by the Bishop Waldemar Hvoslef. In 1957, electric lights were installed in the church and then in 1960, electric heating was installed. In 1965, Erlend Tryti designed an addition that was built to the east. The small extensions on each side of the church porch and tower were designed by Ole Halvorsen and built around 1970. The church was refurbished for the 125th anniversary in 2007.

== See also ==
- List of churches in Bjørgvin
