= Askeland, Lindås =

Village in Alver Municipality, Norway

Askeland
- Village
- Interactive map of Askeland
- Coordinates: 60.66015°N 5.43017°E
- Country: Norway
- Region: Western Norway
- County: Vestland
- District: Nordhordland
- Municipality: Alver Municipality
- Elevation: 70 m (230 ft)
- Time zone: UTC+01:00 (CET)
  - Summer (DST): UTC+02:00 (CEST)
- Post Code: 5993 Ostereidet

Askeland is a village in Alver Municipality in Vestland county, Norway. The village is located about 5 kilometres (3.1 mi) north of the village of Ostereidet. It sits on a small peninsula along the Hindnesfjorden, a branch off the main Austfjorden. The village was located in Lindås Municipality before 2020 when the new Alver Municipality was established.
