= Solheim, Masfjorden =

Village in Masfjorden Municipality, Norway

Solheim
- Village
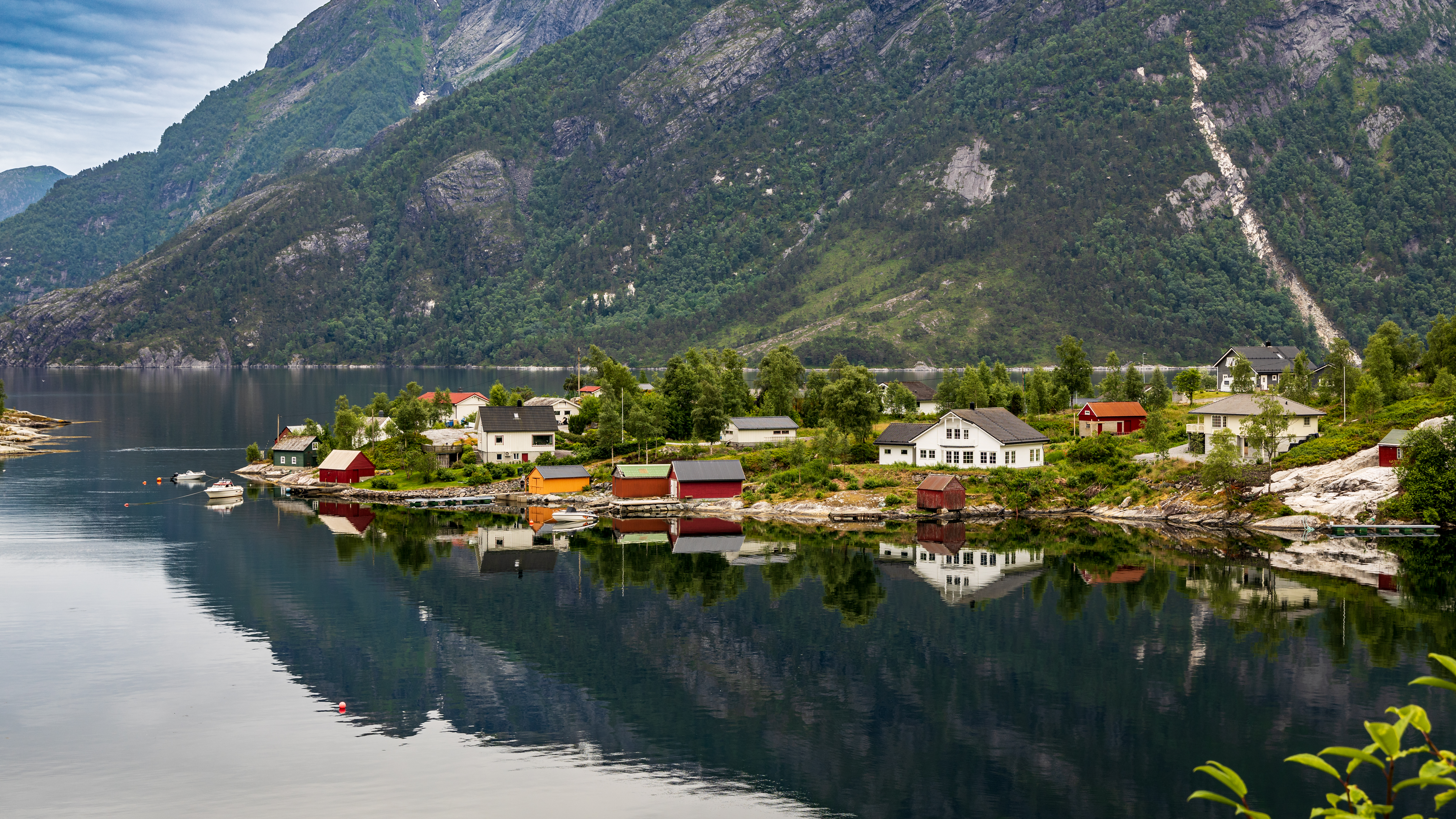
- View of the village
- Interactive map of Solheim
- Coordinates: 60.88807°N 5.47165°E
- Country: Norway
- Region: Western Norway
- County: Vestland
- District: Nordhordland
- Municipality: Masfjorden Municipality
- Elevation: 11 m (36 ft)
- Time zone: UTC+01:00 (CET)
  - Summer (DST): UTC+02:00 (CEST)
- Post Code: 5983 Haugsvær

Solheim is a village in Masfjorden Municipality in Vestland county, Norway. The village is located on the Masfjorden, at the entrance to the Haugsværfjorden. The village lies about 5 kilometres (3.1 mi) southwest of the village of Haugsvær, about 6 kilometres (3.7 mi) northwest of the village of Matre, and about 15 kilometres (9.3 mi) northeast of the village of Hosteland.

Solheim Church is located in the village. The European route E39 highway can be accessed about 5 kilometres (3.1 mi) north of the village of Solheim.

== Media gallery ==
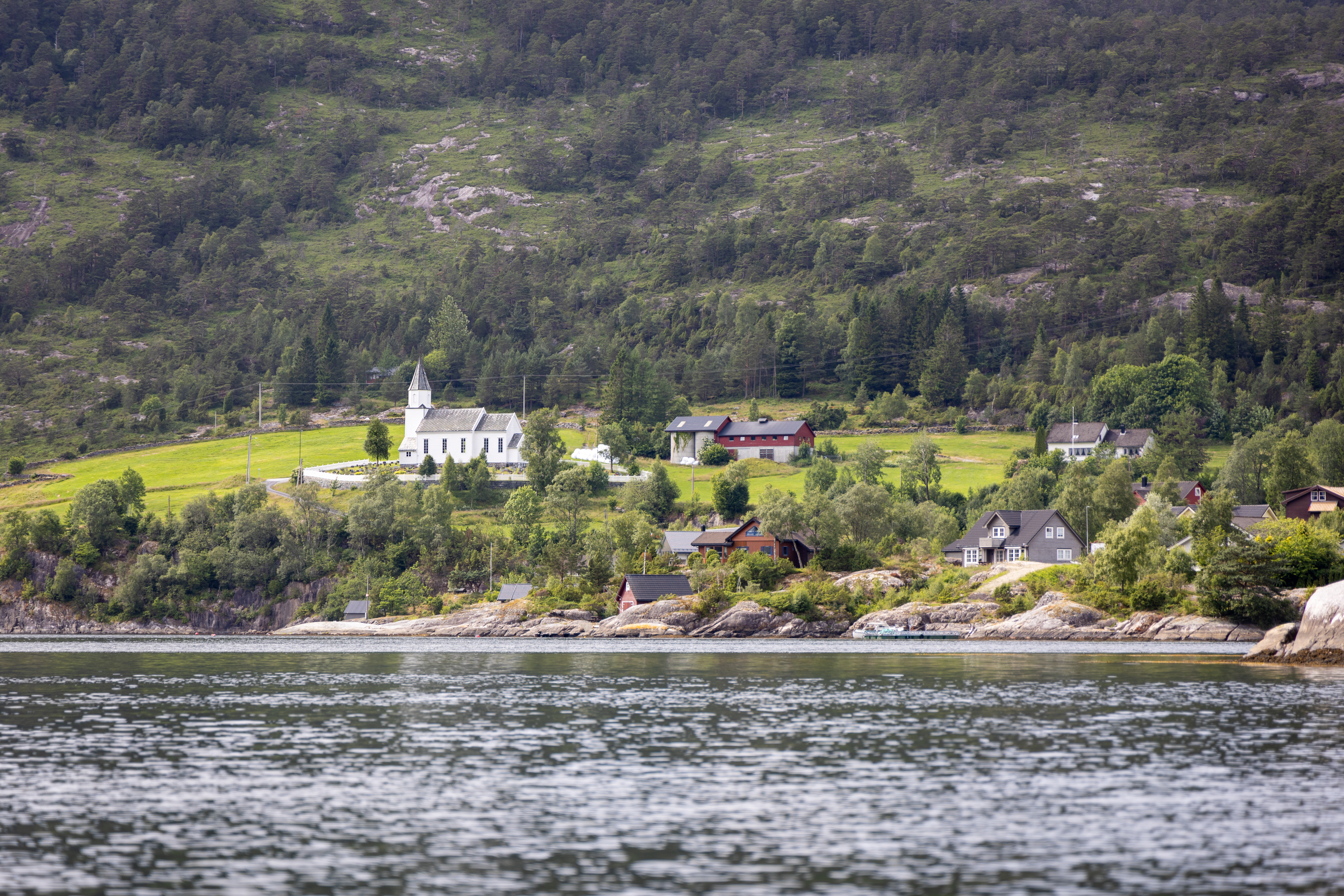

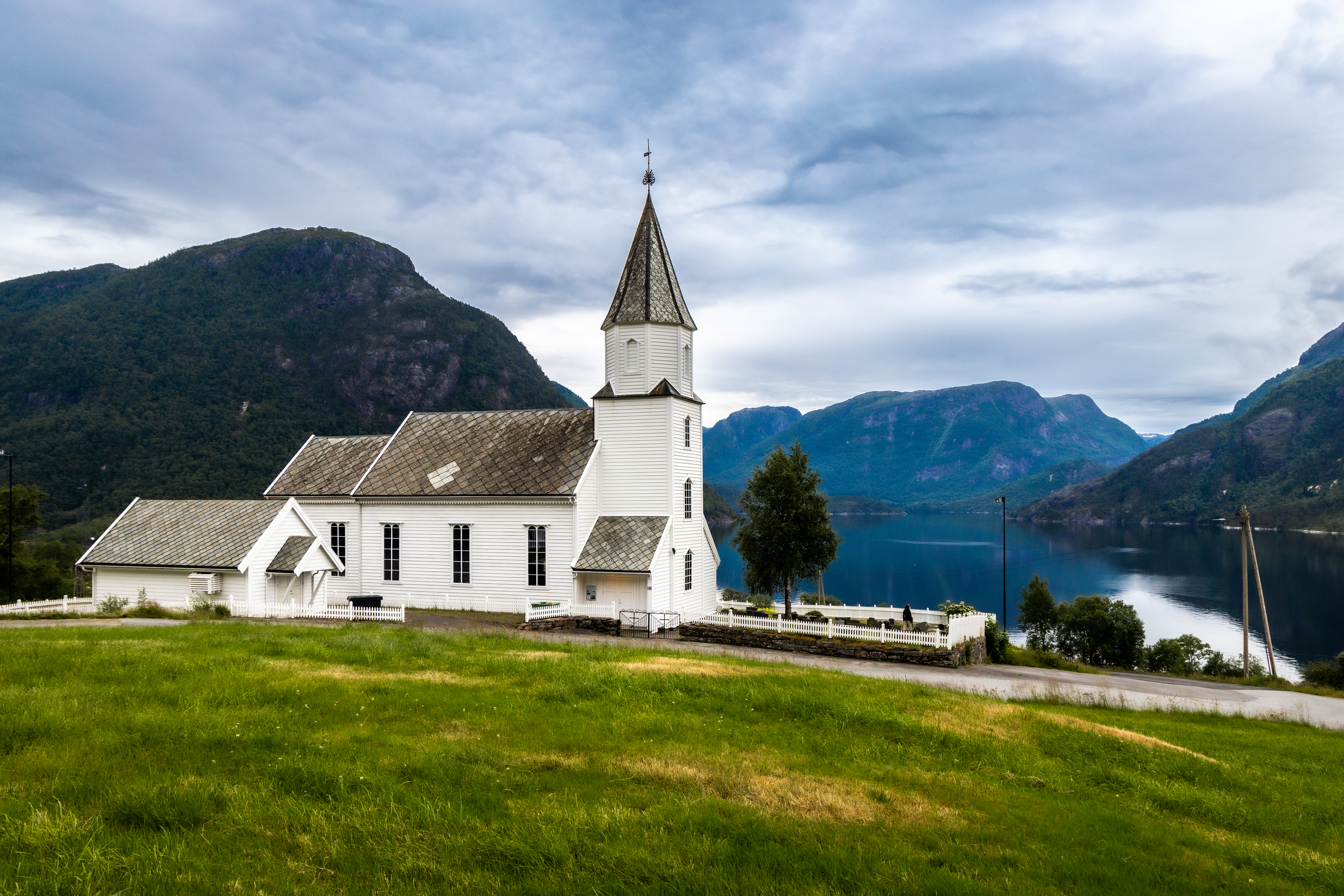

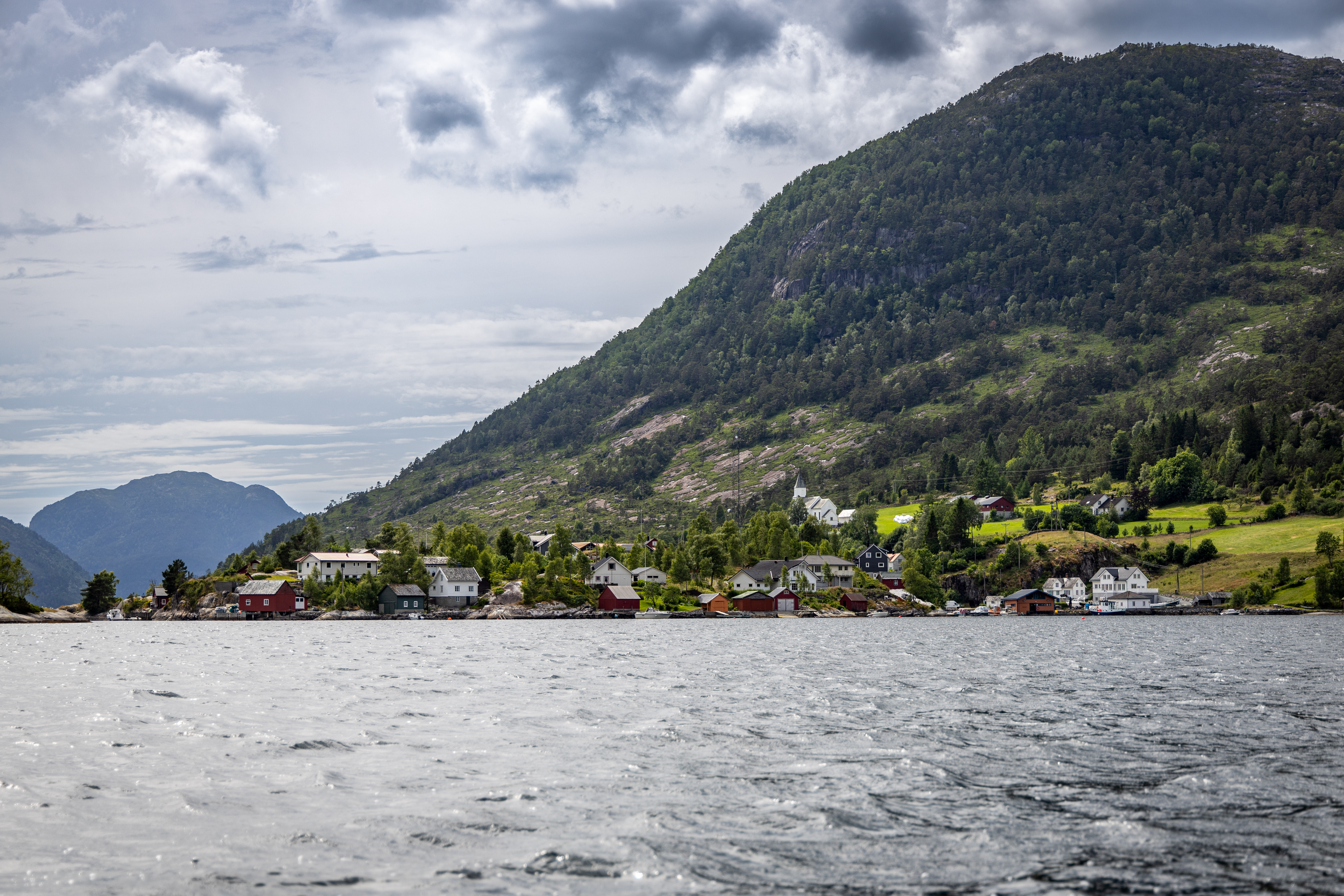

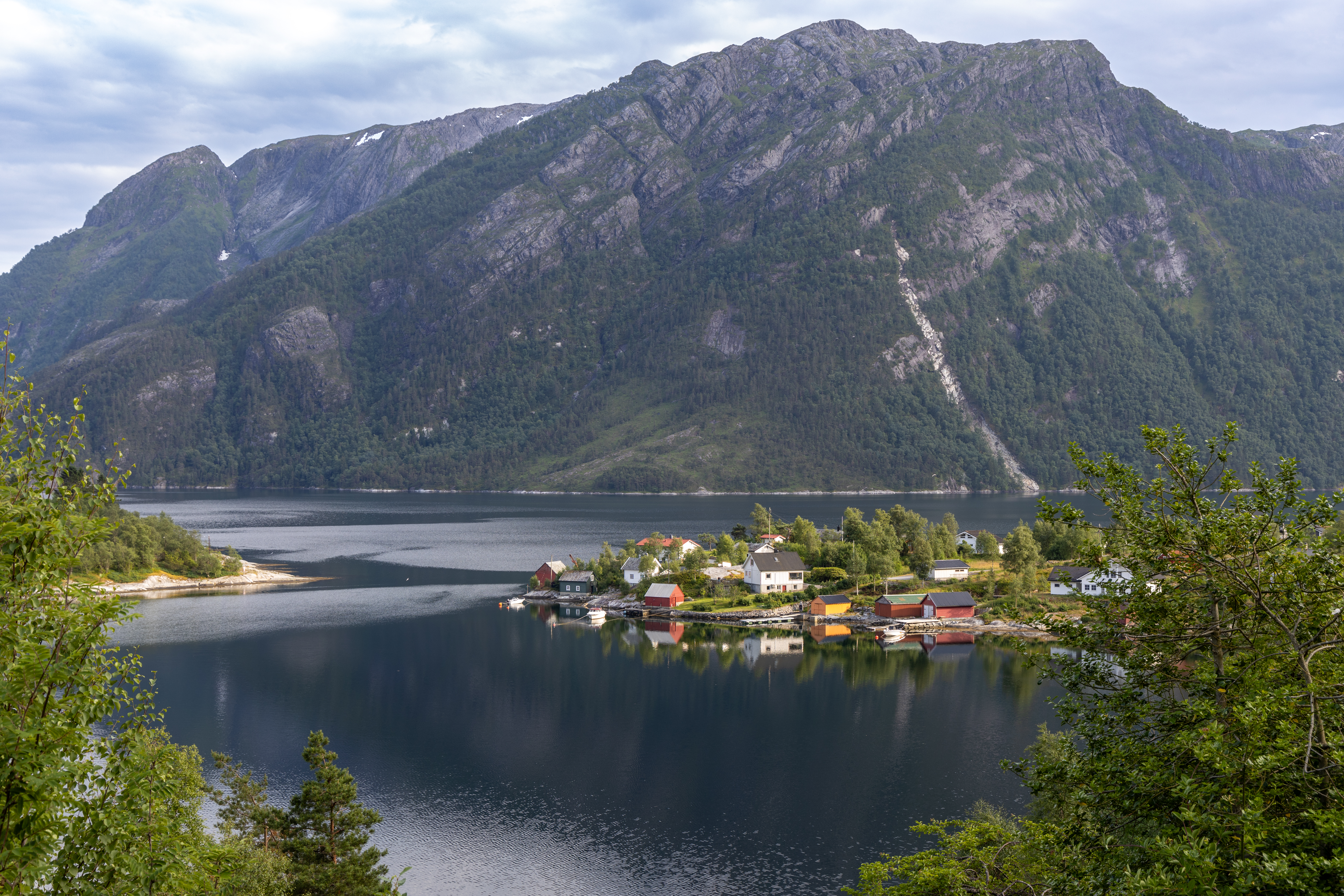
