= Matre Hydroelectric Power Station =

Hydroelectric plant in Masfjorden, Vestland, Norway

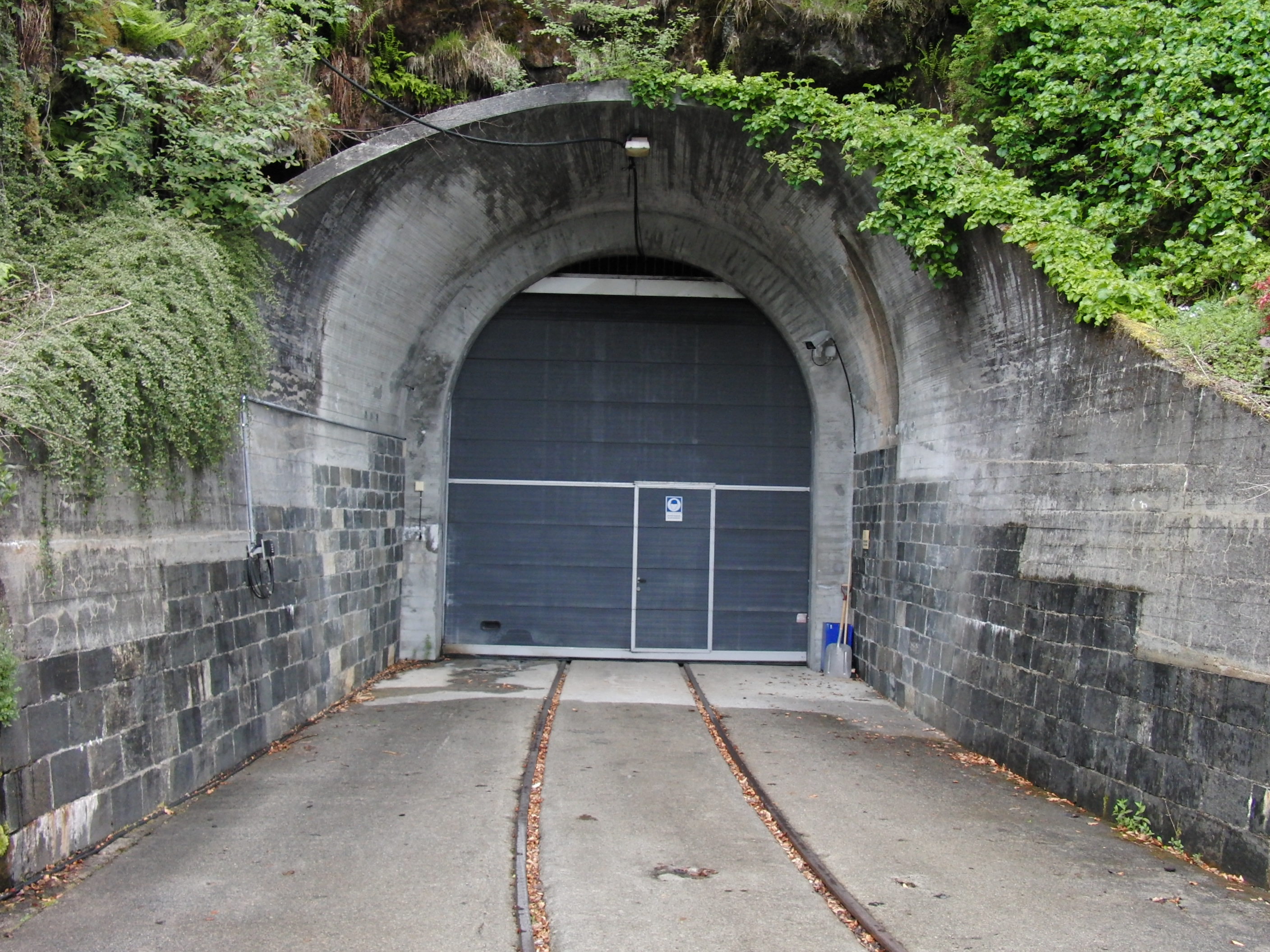
- Official name: Matre kraftverk
- Country: Norway
- Location: Matre, Masfjorden Municipality
- Coordinates: 60°52′25″N 5°35′28″E
- Status: Operational
- Commission date: 1959; 67 years ago
- Owner: Eviny Fornybar
- Operator: Eviny Fornybar

Tidal power station
- Tidal range: 463 m (1,519 ft); 464 m (1,522 ft)

Power generation
- Nameplate capacity: 246 MW
- Capacity factor: 60.5%
- Annual net output: 1,302 GW·h

The Matre Power Station is a hydroelectric power station located in the village of Matre in Masfjorden Municipality in Vestland county, Norway. Two facilities operate at a combined installed capacity of 246 megawatts (330,000 hp), with an average annual production of 1,302 gigawatt-hours (4,690 TJ).
