= Ludvig Hope =

Ludvig Hope (17 January 1871, Masfjorden – 26 October 1954) was a Norwegian lay preacher, writer, teacher and organizer. He was a popular preacher from the late 1890s, and could gather up to 5,000 listeners at his meetings. He was a central leader for the organization Kinamisjonen (later Norsk Luthersk Misjonssamband). His demand for a "free" communion, outside the churches, was met with opposition, but was finally settled by law in 1913. During World War II he was imprisoned for 15 months at the Grini concentration camp, after having signed a protest letter together with other church leaders.
