= Haugsvær =

Village in Masfjorden Municipality, Norway

- Village
- Interactive map of Haugsvær
- Coordinates: 60.90688°N 5.52343°E
- Country: Norway
- Region: Western Norway
- County: Vestland
- District: Nordhordland
- Municipality: Masfjorden Municipality
- Elevation: 43 m (141 ft)
- Time zone: UTC+01:00 (CET)
  - Summer (DST): UTC+02:00 (CEST)
- Post Code: 5983 Haugsvær

Haugsvær is a village in Masfjorden Municipality in Vestland county, Norway. The village is located near the head of the Haugsværfjorden, an inner branch of the Masfjorden. It is located about 5 kilometres (3.1 mi) north of the village of Matre, about 5 kilometres (3.1 mi) northeast of the village of Solheim, and about 10 kilometres (6.2 mi) south of the village of Instefjord (in the neighboring Gulen Municipality). The European route E39 highway runs north–south through the village.
