= Ostereidet =

Village in Alver Municipality, Norway

- Village
- Interactive map of Ostereidet
- Coordinates: 60.62328°N 5.47852°E
- Country: Norway
- Region: Western Norway
- County: Vestland
- District: Nordhordland
- Municipality: Alver Municipality
- Elevation: 22 m (72 ft)
- Time zone: UTC+01:00 (CET)
  - Summer (DST): UTC+02:00 (CEST)
- Post Code: 5993 Ostereidet

Ostereidet is a village in Alver Municipality in Vestland county, Norway. The village is located along the Osterfjorden in eastern Alver. The European route E39 highway runs through the village. Ostereidet is one of the larger settlements in eastern Alver, and it is the site of Ostereidet Church. The village of Askeland lies about 5 kilometres (3.1 mi) to the north, near the Austfjorden.
