= Hans Bergersen Wergeland =

Norwegian politician

Hans Bergersen Wergeland (23 July 1861 – 8 July 1931) was a Norwegian politician.

He was born in the northern part of Lindaas Municipality (in 1879, that area became part of Masfjorden Municipality). He worked as a farmer from 1885. He was mayor of Masfjorden Municipality from 1901-1916. He also chaired the boards of the local savings bank and the local shipping company.

He was elected to the Norwegian Parliament in 1907, for the Coalition Party, and in 1910 for the Conservative Party. He represented the constituency Nordhordland.
