= Frøyset Church =

Church in Vestland, Norway

- Frøyset kyrkje
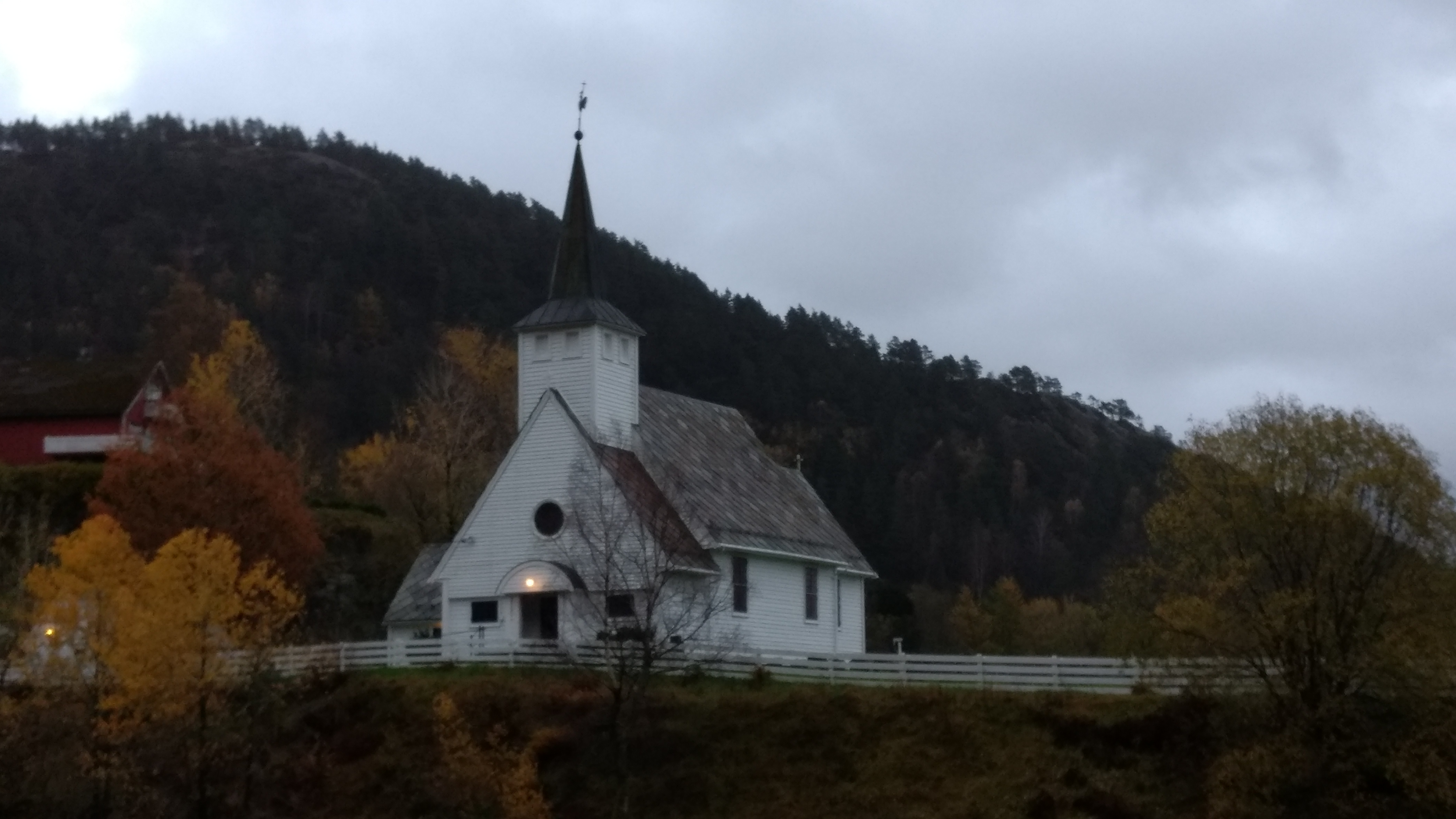
- View of the church
- Frøyset Church
- 60°51′49″N 5°12′36″E
- Location: Masfjorden, Vestland
- Country: Norway
- Denomination: Church of Norway
- Previous denomination: Catholic Church
- Churchmanship: Evangelical Lutheran

History
- Status: Parish church
- Founded: 1937
- Consecrated: 1937

Architecture
- Functional status: Active
- Architect: Thorolf Hals Frølich
- Architectural type: Long church
- Completed: 1937 (89 years ago)

Specifications
- Capacity: 180
- Materials: Wood

Administration
- Diocese: Bjørgvin bispedømme
- Deanery: Nordhordland prosti
- Parish: Masfjorden
- Norwegian Cultural Heritage Site
- Type: Church
- Status: Not protected
- ID: 84210

Frøyset Church (Norwegian: Frøyset kyrkje) is a parish church of the Church of Norway in Masfjorden Municipality in Vestland county, Norway. It is located in the village of Frøyset. It sits at the mouth of the small Frøysetelva river, along the shore of the Frøysetfjorden. It is one of the three churches in the Masfjorden parish which is part of the Nordhordland prosti (deanery) in the Diocese of Bjørgvin. The white, wooden church was built in a long church design in 1937 using plans drawn up by the architect Thorolf Hals Frølich. The church seats about 180 people and it serves the northwestern part of the municipality.

== History ==
As early as 1919, the people of northwestern Masfjorden began asking for their own church. In 1928, the parish council approved the plan to build a new chapel at Frøyset and this was also approved by the Ministry of Church Affairs in 1929. After this, there was much time spent planning and debating the location and design of the new church. In 1935, the land was purchased and permission was granted to begin construction. The church was consecrated in 1937 by the Bishop Andreas Fleischer. In 1959, electric heating and lighting were installed. In 1969–1970, the church was expanded with the addition of a kitchen and parish hall off the north side of the church. It also included a new sacristy and coat room. The new addition was designed by Kåre Frølich.

== Media gallery ==
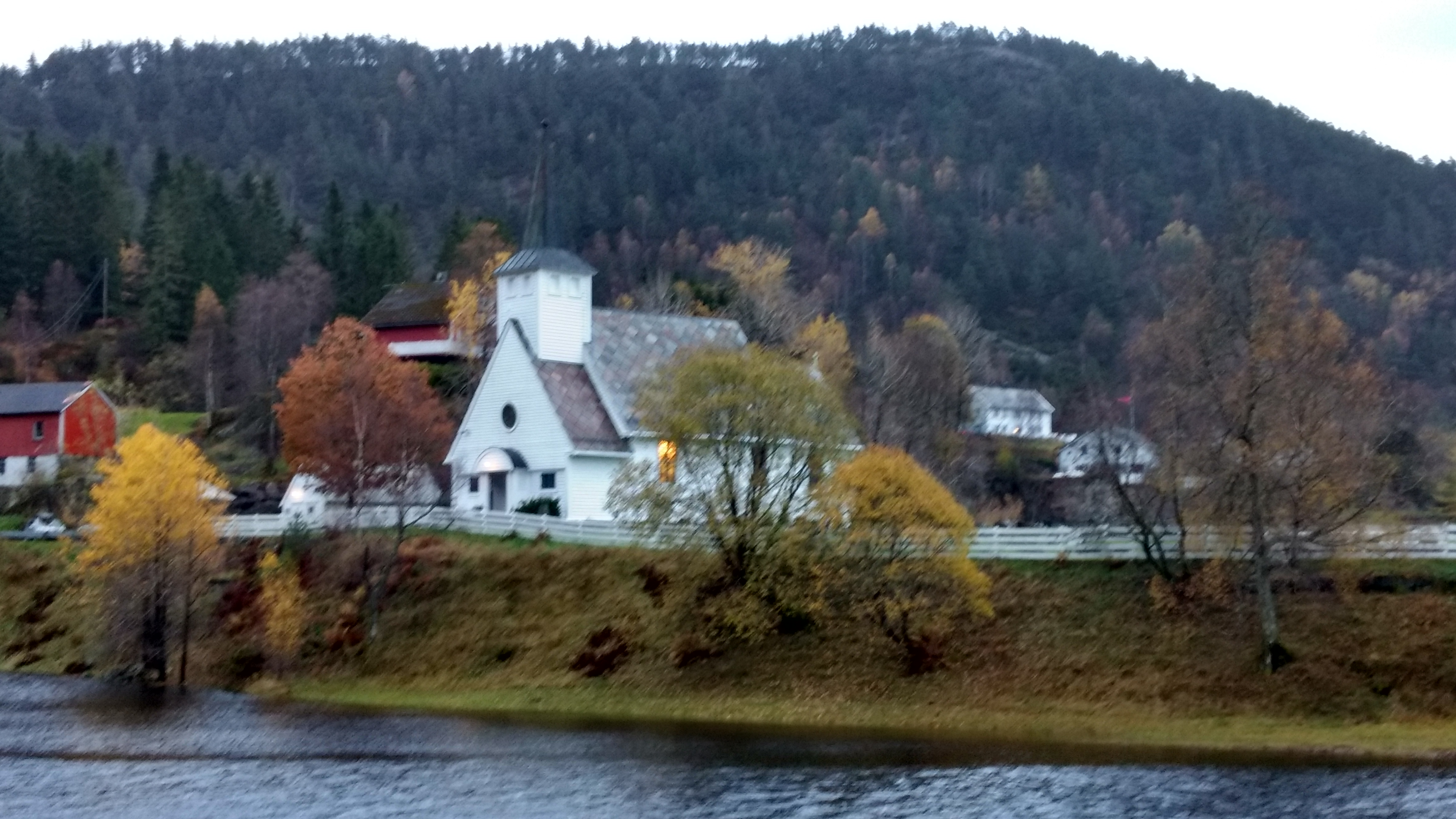

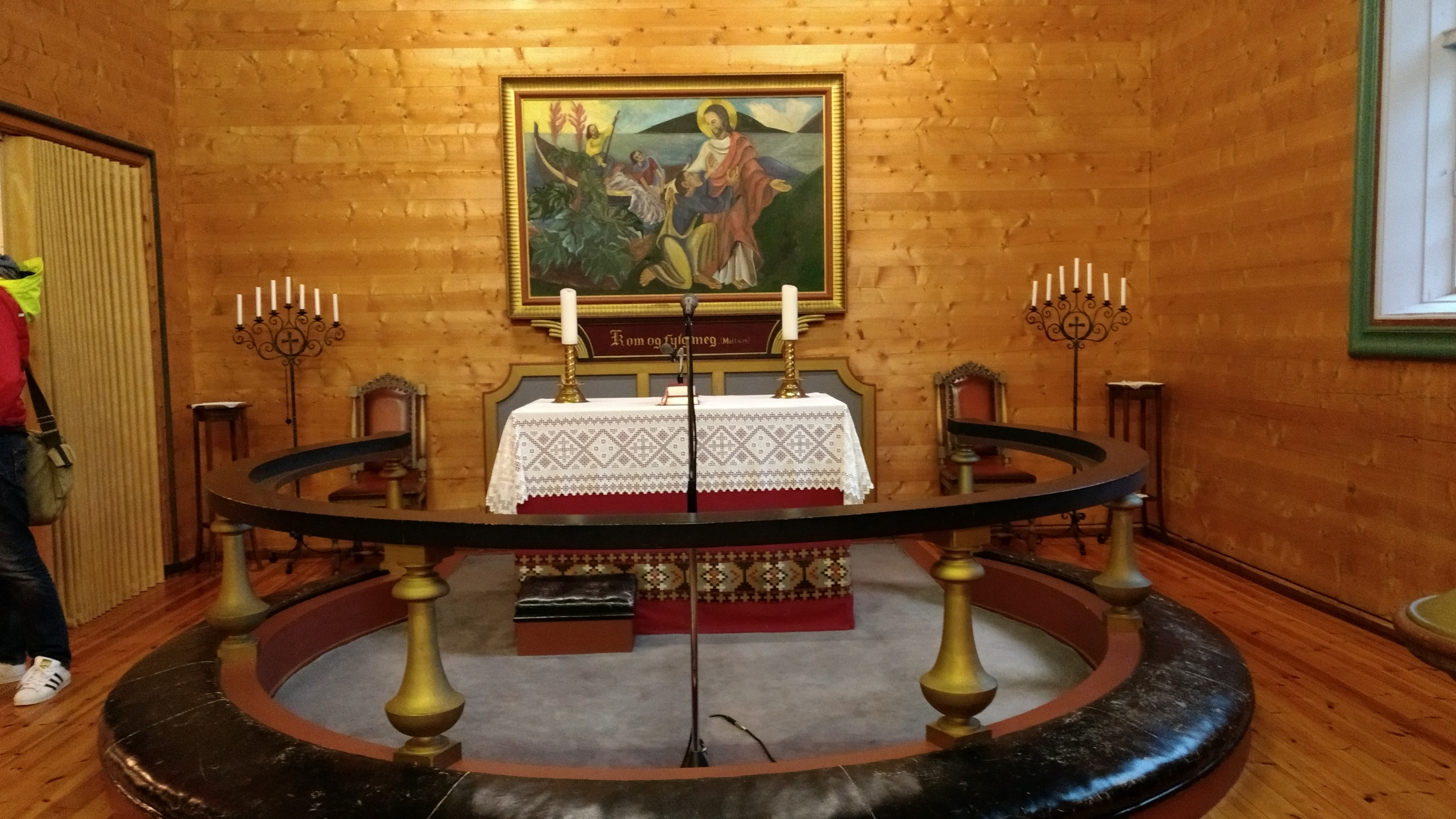

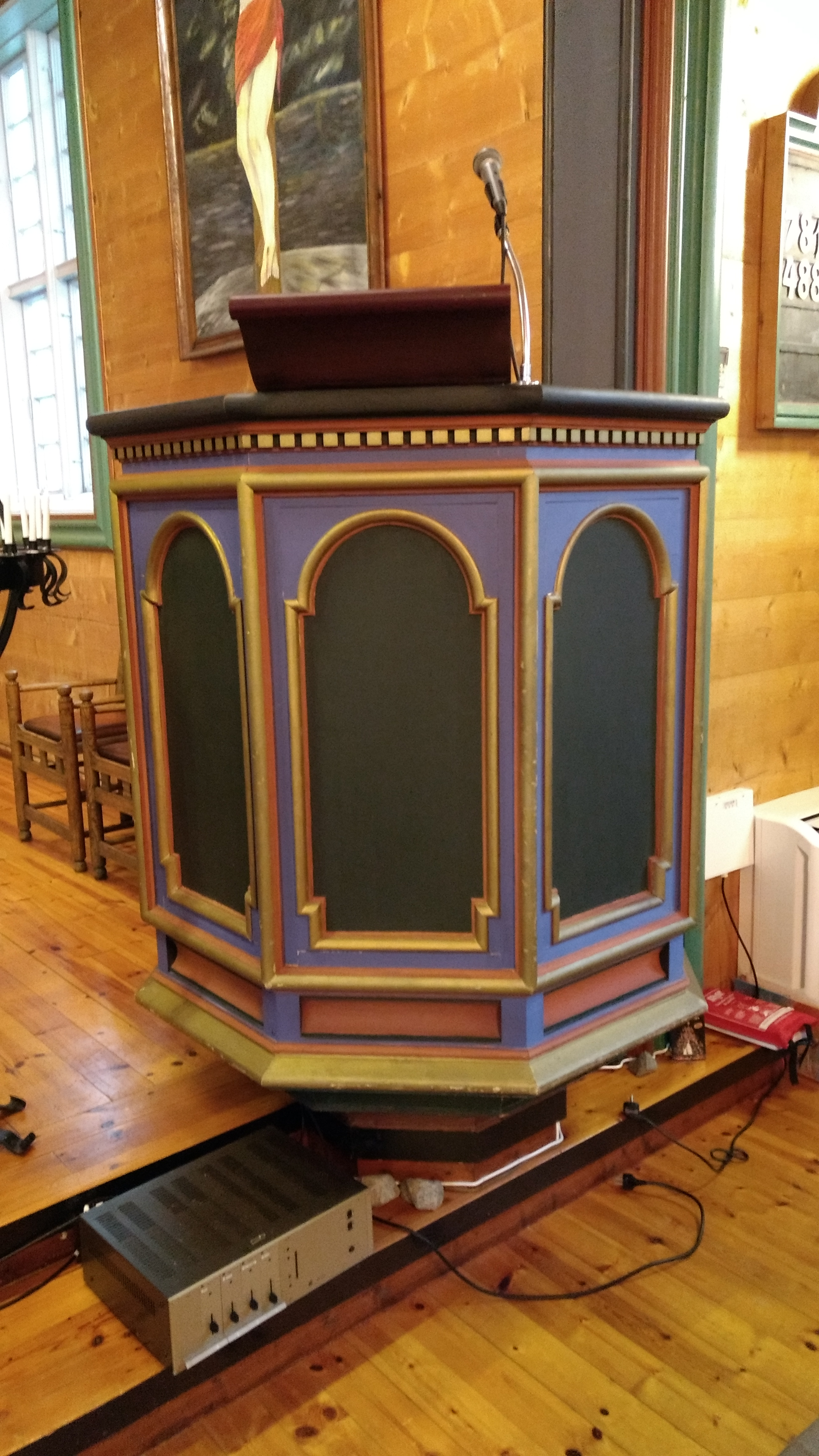

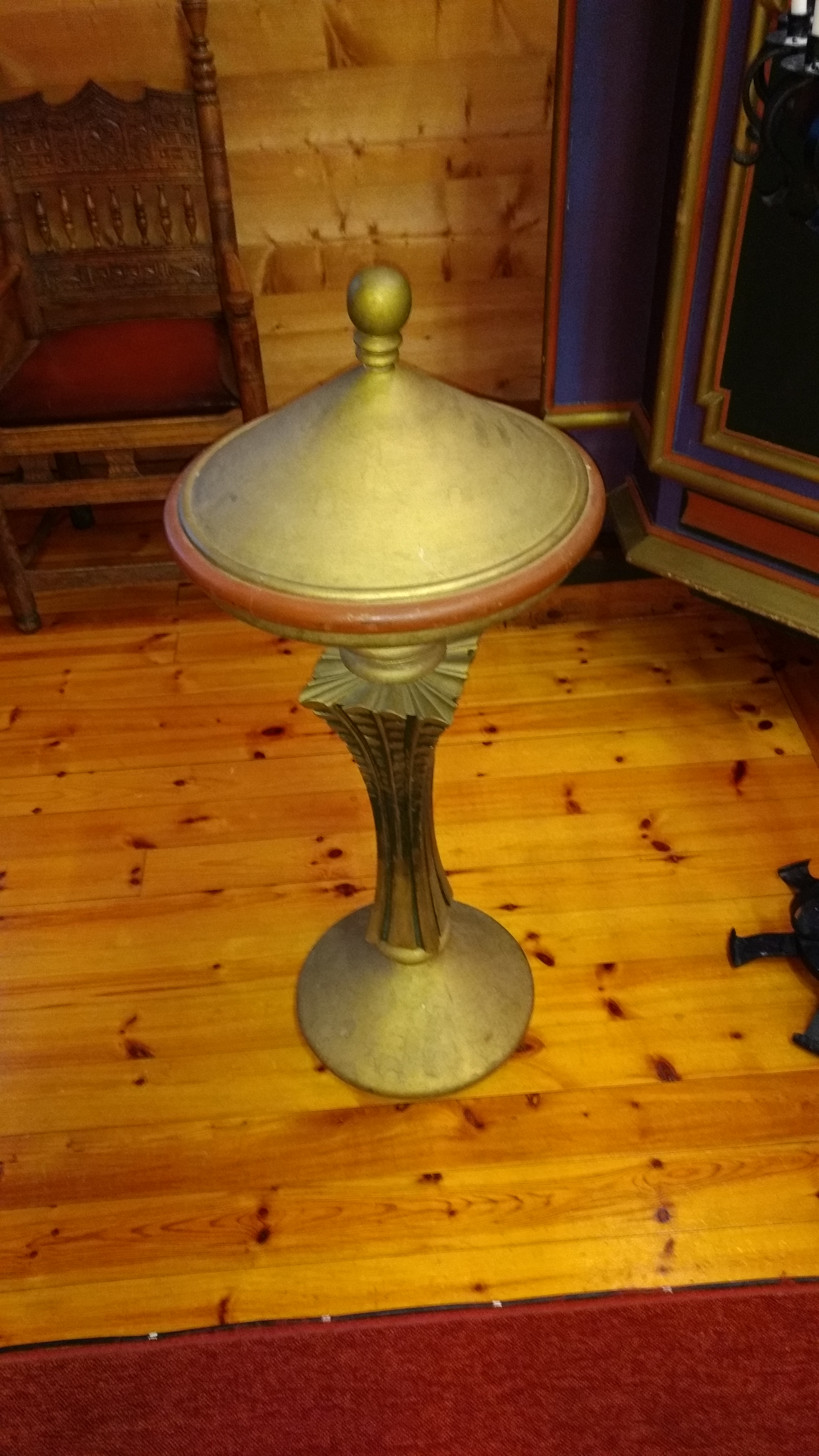

== See also ==
- List of churches in Bjørgvin
