= Matre =

Village in Masfjorden Municipality, Norway

- Village
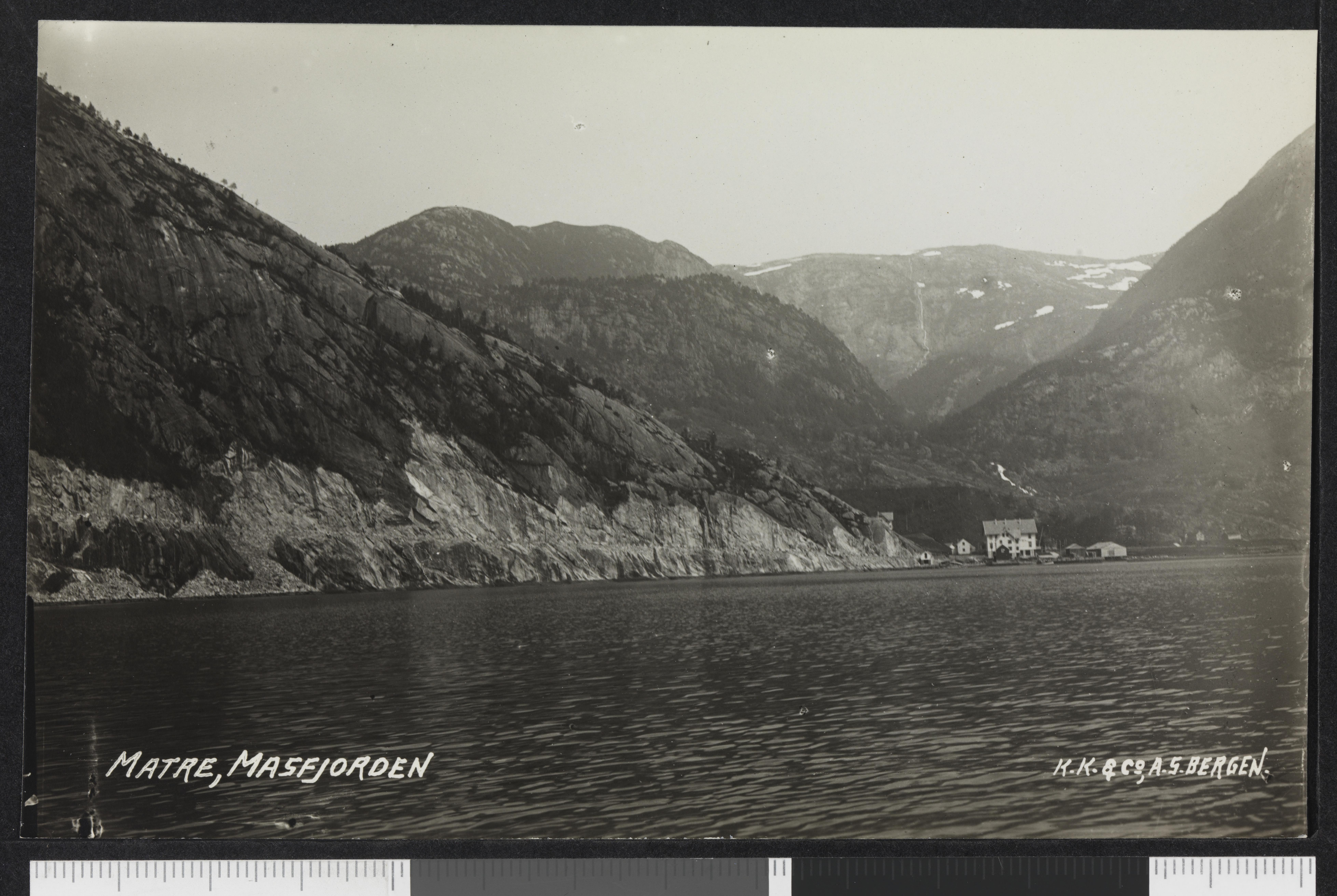
- Historic view of the village, seen from the fjord
- Interactive map of Matre
- Coordinates: 60.87417°N 5.57914°E
- Country: Norway
- Region: Western Norway
- County: Vestland
- District: Nordhordland
- Municipality: Masfjorden Municipality
- Elevation: 2 m (6.6 ft)
- Time zone: UTC+01:00 (CET)
  - Summer (DST): UTC+02:00 (CEST)
- Post Code: 5984 Matredal

Matre is a village in Masfjorden Municipality in Vestland county, Norway. The village is located at the head of the Matresfjorden, the inner part of the Masfjorden. It is located about 5 kilometres (3.1 mi) south of the village of Haugsvær, about 25 kilometres (16 mi) southwest of the village of Bjordal (in neighboring Vik Municipality), and about 16 kilometres (9.9 mi) north of the village of Romarheim (in neighboring Alver Municipality).

The European route E39 highway passes north–south through the village of Matre. The Norwegian Institute of Marine Research has an office in Matre. The Matre Hydroelectric Power Station is located in this village as well.
