= Austfjorden (Vestland) =

Fjord in Vestland, Norway

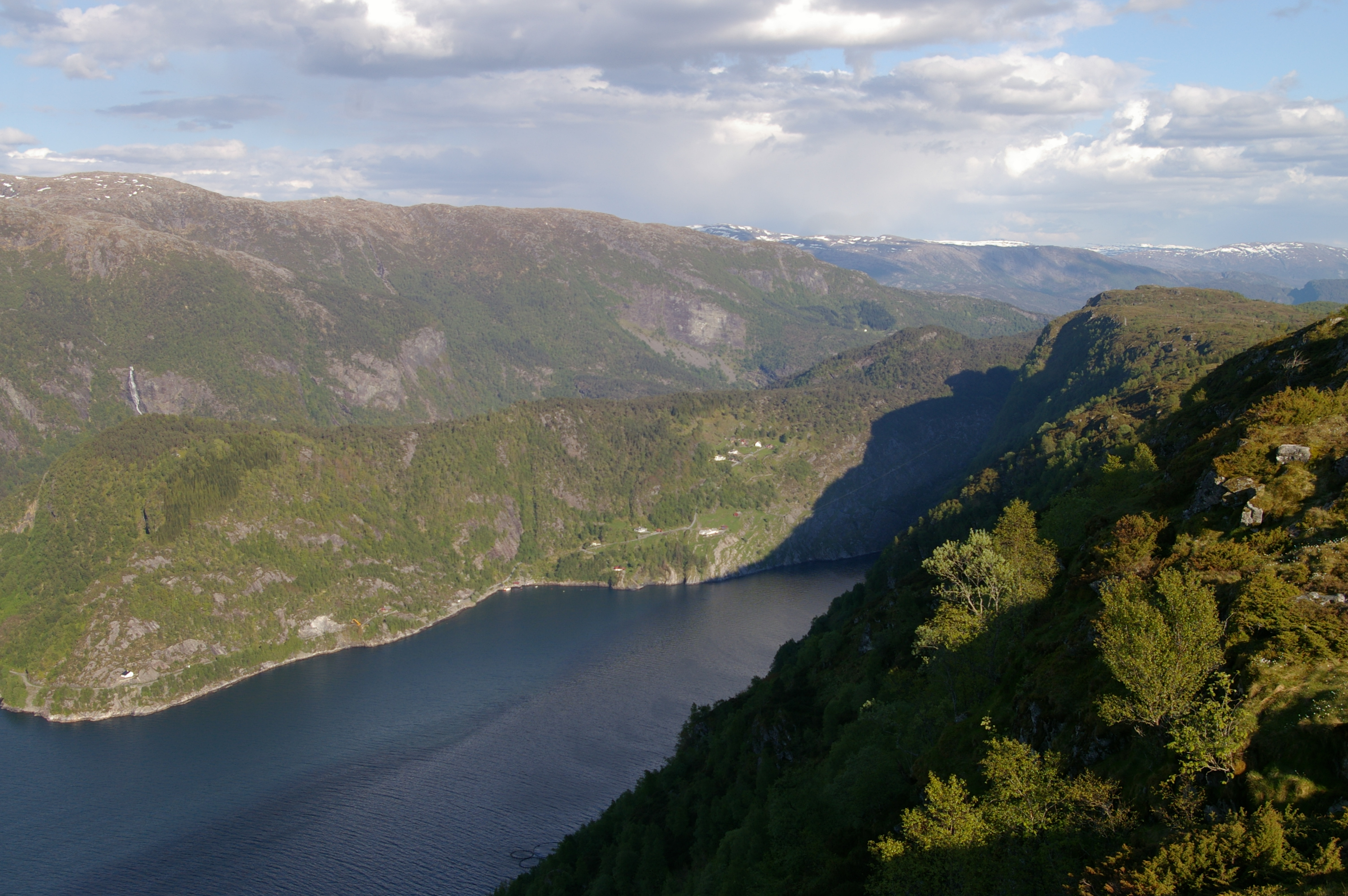
- View of the Austfjorden, seen from Djupdalseggane, Alver
- Interactive map of Austfjorden
- Location: Vestland county, Norway
- Coordinates: 60.73144°N 5.33805°E
- Type: Fjord
- Primary inflows: Masfjorden
- Primary outflows: Fensfjorden
- Basin countries: Norway
- Max. length: 20 kilometres (12 mi)

Austfjorden is a fjord in Vestland county, Norway. The 20-kilometre (12 mi) long fjord runs along the border between Alver Municipality and Masfjorden Municipality. It starts in Alver and extends to the northwest. The Masfjorden joins the Austfjorden from the north, and then the Austfjorden empties into the Fensfjorden before reaching the open sea near the island of Fedje. The Austfjorden is the innermost arm of the Fensfjorden. The village of Knarrviki and the Mongstad industrial area lie on the western shore of the Austfjorden. The village of Myking lies on the western shore of the fjord, near the innermost part of the fjord.

On the north side of the Austfjorden there are several deep bays. The first of these is the 2-kilometre (1 mi) long Mjangersvågen with the small village of Mjanger the head of the bay. The next two are Nordkvingevågen with a harbor area at the village of Nordkvingo and Sørekvingevågen with a harbor at the village of Sørkvingo. Between these two lies the cape Melshovden. A little further south into the fjord is the Kjekallevågen bay where there is a causeway and a bridge at the mouth of the bay. At the Kjekallevågen bay, the Austefjorden stretches 6 kilometres (4 mi) farther southeast and the Hidnesfjorden branches off to the west and heads south for about 8 kilometres (5.0 mi). At the head of the Hidnesfjorden, there is a 1.7-kilometre (1.1 mi) wide isthmus of land that separates this fjord from the Osterfjorden to the south. The village of Ostereidet lies on the isthmus.

== See also ==
- List of Norwegian fjords
