= Masfjordnes =

Village in Masfjorden Municipality, Norway

- Village
- Interactive map of Masfjordnes
- Coordinates: 60.80049°N 5.30559°E
- Country: Norway
- Region: Western Norway
- County: Vestland
- District: Nordhordland
- Municipality: Masfjorden Municipality
- Elevation: 8 m (26 ft)
- Time zone: UTC+01:00 (CET)
  - Summer (DST): UTC+02:00 (CEST)
- Post Code: 5981 Masfjordnes

Masfjordnes is the administrative centre of Masfjorden Municipality in Vestland county, Norway. The village lies along the southern shore of the Masfjorden, along Norwegian County Road 570. The village is very narrow, occupying the 200-metre (660 ft) wide strip of shoreline between the fjord and the mountains.

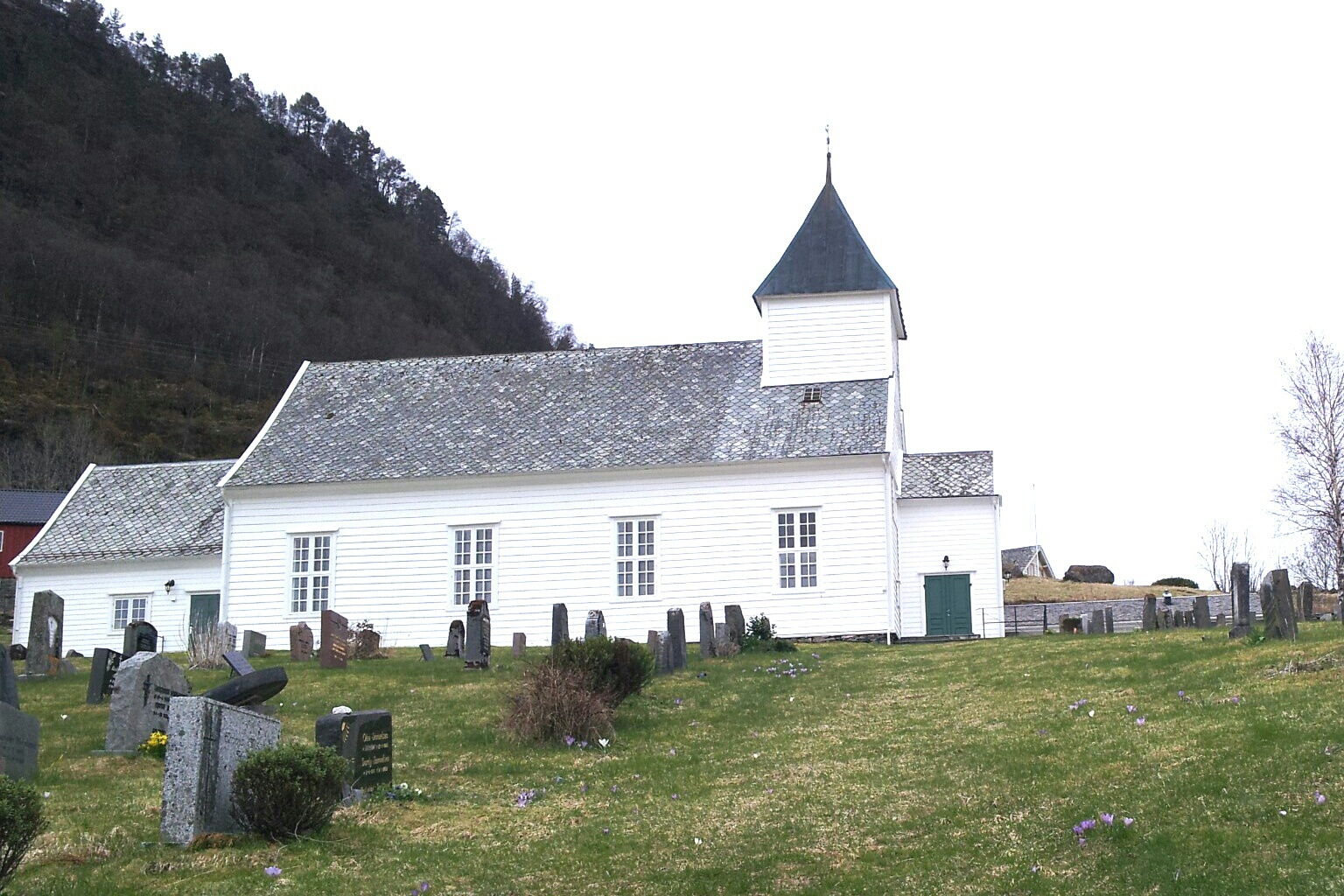
View of Sandnes Church

The small village is often called Sandnes by the locals since Sandnes Church is located here. There is an 800-metre (0.50 mi) long cable ferry from Masfjordnes to Duesund across the fjord. Masfjordnes is located about 50 kilometres (31 mi) north of the city of Bergen. There was a factory that dyed cloth and yarn on the west side of Masfjordnes from 1889 until 1954.
