= Sandnes Church (Vestland) =

Church in Vestland, Norway

- Sandnes kyrkje
- Masfjorden kyrkje
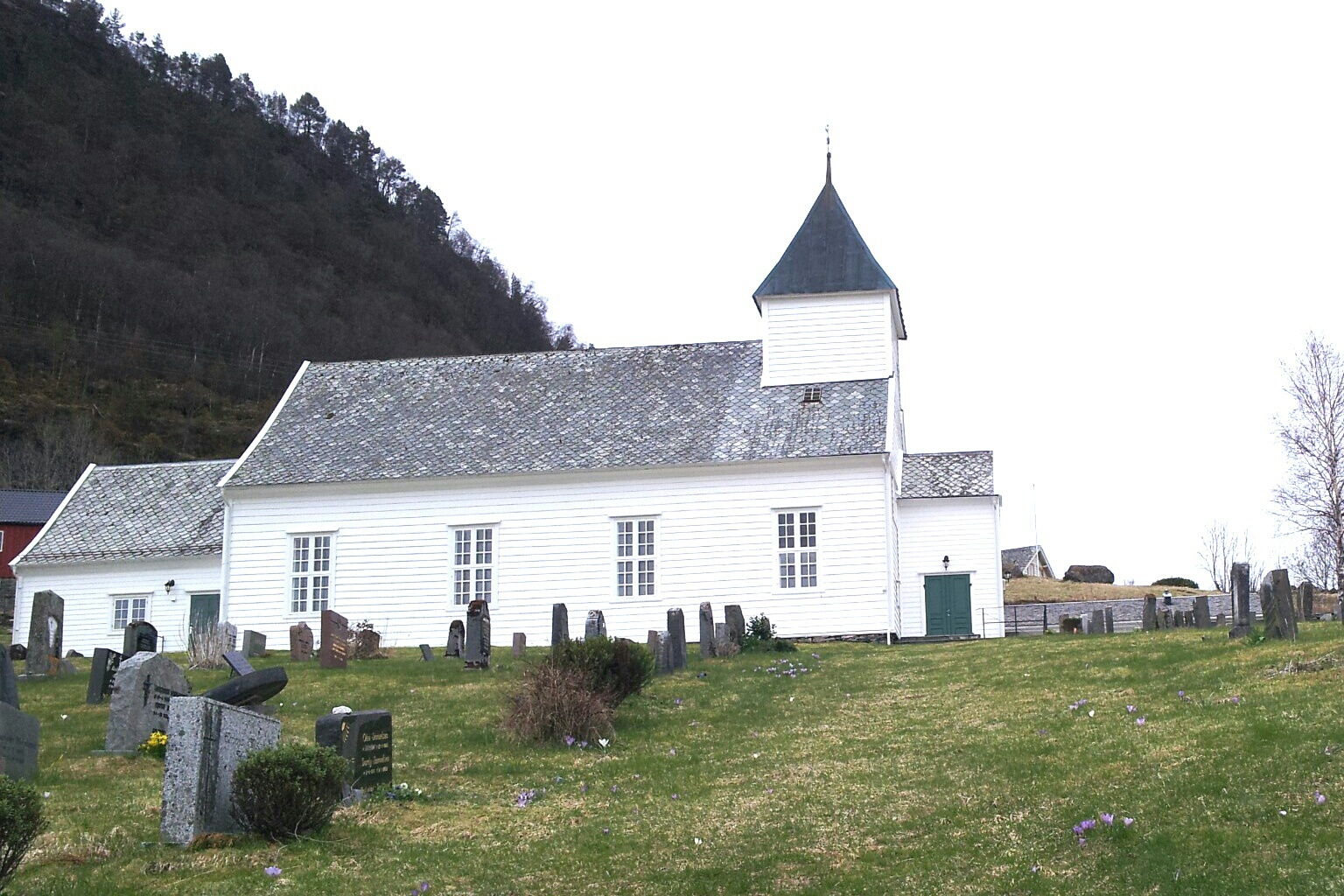
- View of the church
- Sandnes Church
- 60°48′01″N 5°18′10″E
- Location: Masfjorden, Vestland
- Country: Norway
- Denomination: Church of Norway
- Previous denomination: Catholic Church
- Churchmanship: Evangelical Lutheran

History
- Status: Parish church
- Founded: 12th century
- Consecrated: 14 October 1845

Architecture
- Functional status: Active
- Architect: Eiler Hagerup Holtermann
- Architectural type: Long church
- Completed: 1845 (181 years ago)

Specifications
- Capacity: 370
- Materials: Wood

Administration
- Diocese: Bjørgvin bispedømme
- Deanery: Nordhordland prosti
- Parish: Masfjorden
- Norwegian Cultural Heritage Site
- Type: Church
- Status: Automatically protected
- ID: 84404

Sandnes Church (Norwegian: Sandnes kyrkje, also known as Masfjorden kyrkje) is a parish church of the Church of Norway in Masfjorden Municipality in Vestland county, Norway. It is located in the village of Masfjordnes, right on the shore of the Masfjorden. It is one of the three churches in the Masfjorden parish which is part of the Nordhordland prosti (deanery) in the Diocese of Bjørgvin. The white, wooden church was built in a long church design in 1845 using plans drawn up by the architect Eiler Hagerup Holtermann who based his designs on plans drawn by Hans Linstow. The church seats about 370 people.

== History ==
The earliest existing historical records of the church date back to the year 1408, but the church was not new that year. There has been a church on this site for many centuries. The first church was a wooden stave church likely from the 12th century. It is not known exactly when the first church was built, but the baptismal font in the church is dated to the 1100s, so that is likely when the church was first established. The old church was eventually torn down (probably during the early 1600s) and it was replaced with a timber-framed long church. This new church had a 12-by-9-metre (39 ft × 30 ft) nave and a 7-by-7-metre (23 ft × 23 ft) choir. An inspection of the church in 1686 showed that the old church was quite dilapidated and in very poor condition and in need of repairs. The church was repaired, including the removal and replacement of the entire church porch in 1693–1695.

By the 1840s, the church was deemed to be too small for the parish. The new church was designed by the pastor Eiler Hagerup Holtermann, who was the brother of the architect Peter Høier Holtermann. Holtermann based his work on Hans Linstow's standardized church drawings. In 1845, the old church was torn down and the new church was built on the same site. The new church was completed in the fall of 1845 and it was consecrated on 14 October 1845. In 1882, a small sacristy was built on the southeast side of the choir. A new church porch with stairs up to the organ gallery was built in 1912. In 1964–1965, the sacristy extension from 1882 received a new foundation and it was extended to include a church hall that included a lower basement level.

== See also ==
- List of churches in Bjørgvin
