= Fensfjorden =

Fjord in Vestland, Norway

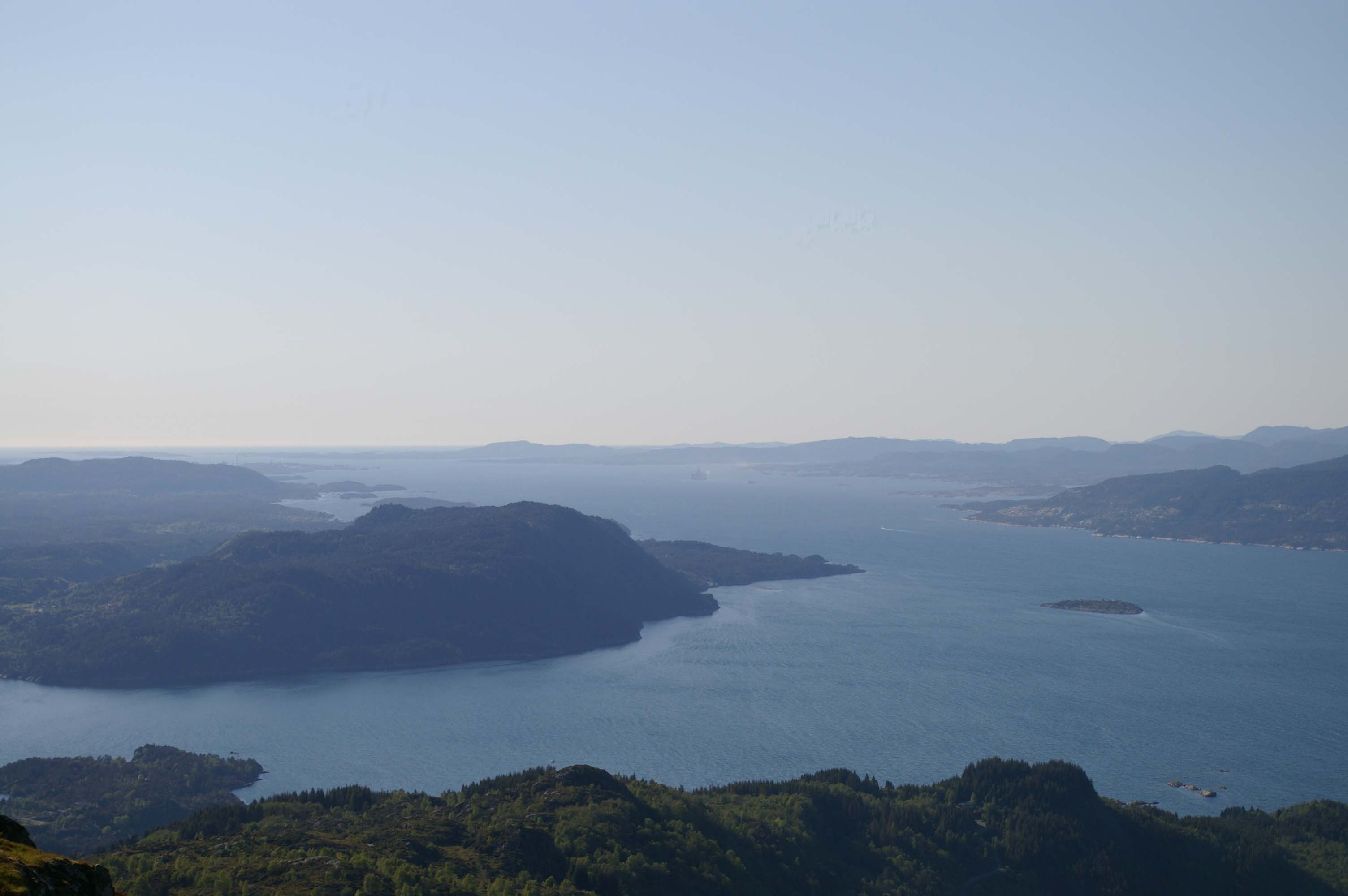
- View of the Fensfjorden in the background
- Interactive map of the fjord
- Location: Vestland county, Norway
- Coordinates: 60.7813°N 5.1835°E
- Type: Fjord
- Primary inflows: Masfjorden and Austfjorden
- Primary outflows: North Sea
- Basin countries: Norway
- Max. length: 30 kilometres (19 mi)
- Max. width: 3 to 5 km (1.9 to 3.1 mi)

Fensfjorden is a fjord in Vestland county, Norway. The 30-kilometre (19 mi) long fjord begins in the North Sea at Holmengrå Lighthouse and flows to the southeast through the municipalities of Austrheim, Gulen, Alver, and Masfjorden. The fjord ends on the Masfjorden-Alver border where it splits into two fjords: Masfjorden (which flows to the northeast into Masfjorden Municipality) and Austfjorden (which flows southeast into Alver Municipality).

The fjord is generally about 3 to 5 kilometres (1.9 to 3.1 mi) wide. There is only one crossing: a car ferry from Sløvåg in Gulen Municipality to Mongstad in Alver Municipality. The islands of Byrknesøyna, Mjømna, and Sandøyna (as well as the mainland) lie on the northern side of the fjord. The south side of the fjord includes the island of Fosøyna and the Lindås peninsula lie on the south side of the fjord.

There is a lot of ship traffic in the outer part of the Fensfjorden due to the large oil refinery and industrial area at Mongstad on the northern end of the Lindås peninsula. Mongstad is Norway's largest port based on tonnage, and Northern Europe's largest oil port. Roughly 2000 ships port at Mongstad in the Fensfjorden annually.

== See also ==
- List of Norwegian fjords
