= Masfjorden Municipality =

Municipality in Vestland, Norway

Masfjorden Municipality Masfjorden kommune
- Municipality
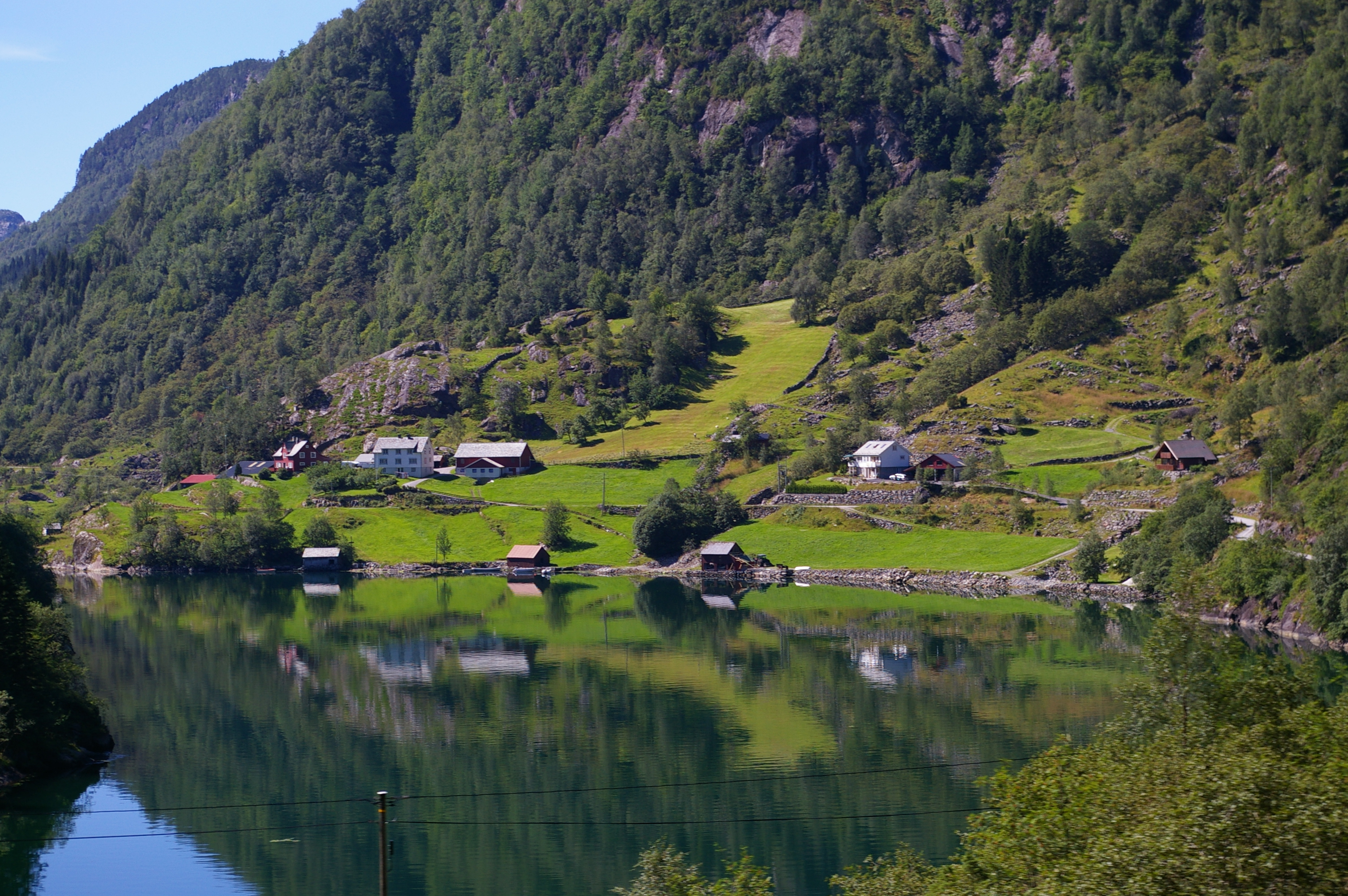
- View of the Haugsværsfjorden

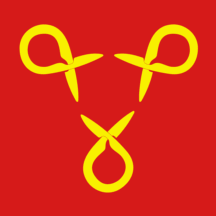
- Flag Coat of arms

- Vestland within Norway

- Masfjorden within Vestland
- Coordinates: 60°50′18″N 05°26′55″E
- Country: Norway
- County: Vestland
- District: Nordhordland
- Established: 1 Mar 1879
  - Preceded by: Lindås Municipality
- Administrative centre: Masfjordnes

Government
  - Mayor (2023): Erlend Kvamsdal (H)

Area
  - Total: 556.08 km^{2} (214.70 sq mi)
  - Land: 509.47 km^{2} (196.71 sq mi)
  - Water: 46.61 km^{2} (18.00 sq mi) 8.4%
  - Rank: #194 in Norway
- Highest elevation: 1,070.89 m (3,513.4 ft)

Population (2025)
  - Total: 1,687
  - Rank: #298 in Norway
  - Density: 3/km^{2} (7.8/sq mi)
  - Change (10 years): ▲ +0.1%
- Demonym: Masfjording

Official language
  - Norwegian form: Nynorsk
- Time zone: UTC+01:00 (CET)
  - Summer (DST): UTC+02:00 (CEST)
- ISO 3166 code: NO-4634
- Website: Official website

Masfjorden is a municipality in the central part of Vestland county in Norway. The municipality is located in the Nordhordland district of the county. The administrative centre of the municipality is the village of Masfjordnes. Other villages in the municipality include Frøyset, Haugsvær, Hosteland, Matre, and Solheim.

The municipality is centered on the Masfjorden which almost divides the municipality completely into a north side and a south side. A cable ferry crosses the fjord from Masfjordnes to Duesund in the western part of the municipality. The Matre Hydroelectric Power Station is located in the eastern part of the municipality.

The 556.08-square-kilometre (214.70 sq mi) municipality is the 194th largest by area out of the 357 municipalities in Norway. Masfjorden Municipality is the 298th most populous municipality in Norway with a population of 1,687. The municipality's population density is 3 inhabitants per square kilometre (7.8/sq mi) and its population has increased by 0.1% over the previous 10-year period.

== General information ==
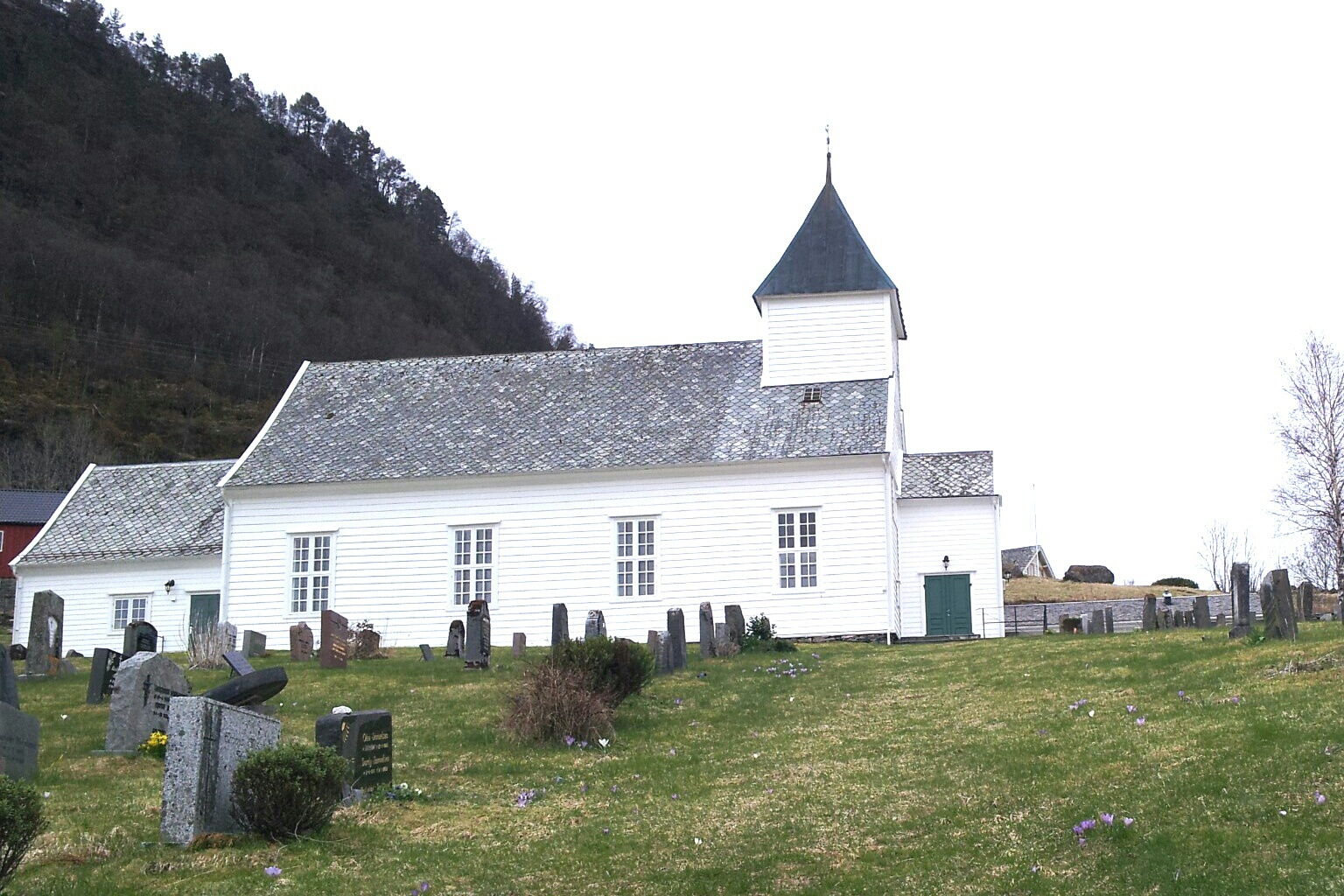
Sandnes Church

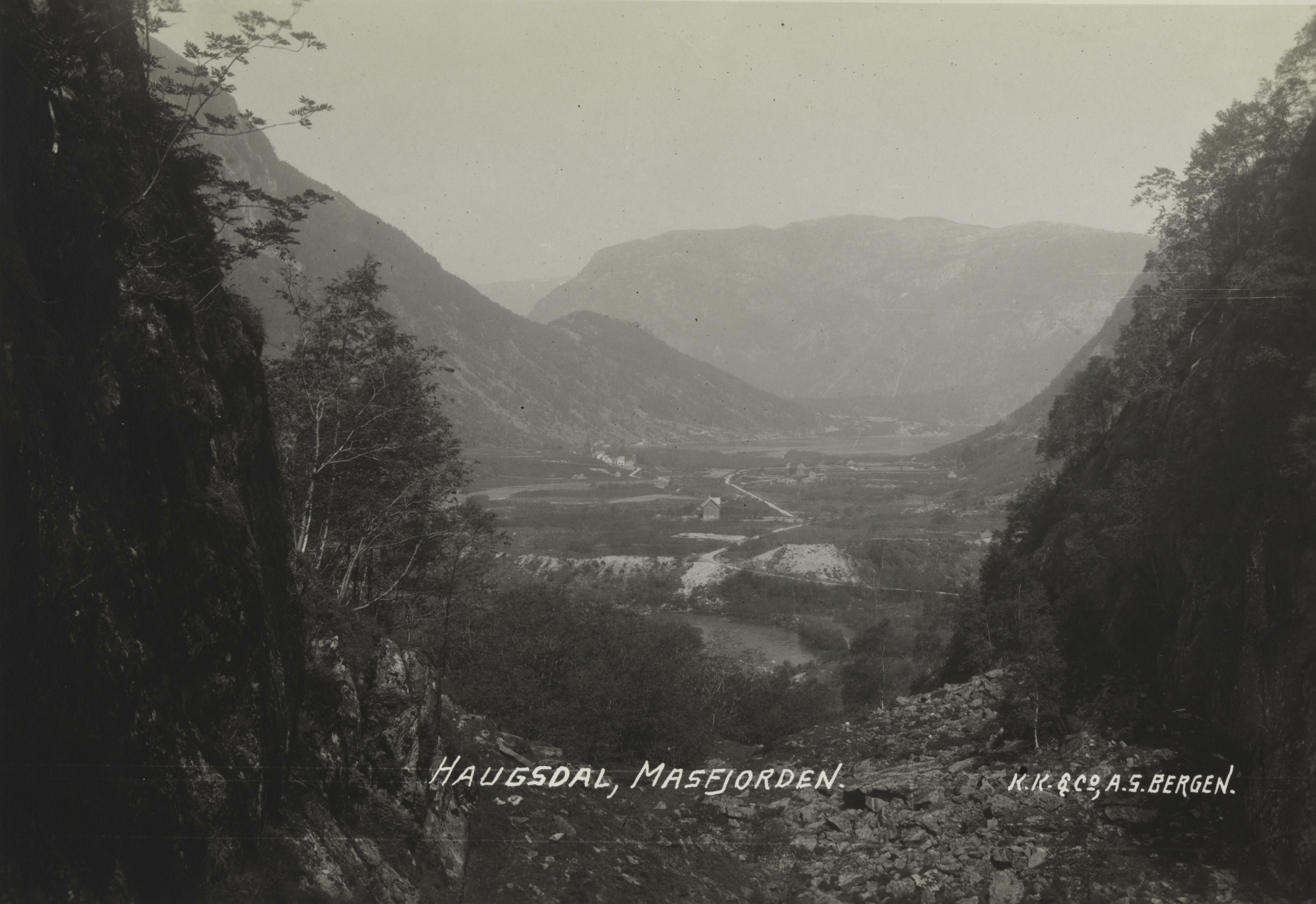
View of the Haugsdal valley in Masfjorden

The parish of Masfjorden was established as a municipality on 1 March 1879 when the large Lindaas Municipality (later spelled Lindås) was divided into two: the northern part (population: 2,336) became the new Masfjorden Municipality and the rest remained as a smaller Lindaas Municipality.

During the 1960s, there were many municipal mergers across Norway due to the work of the Schei Committee. On 1 January 1964, the Einestrand, Eikebotn, and Kikallen area along the Austfjorden (population: 25) was transferred from Lindås Municipality to Masfjorden Municipality.

Historically, this municipality was part of the old Hordaland county. On 1 January 2020, the municipality became a part of the newly-formed Vestland county (after Hordaland and Sogn og Fjordane counties were merged).

=== Name ===
The municipality (originally the parish) is named after the Masfjorden (Old Norse: Matrsfjǫrðr) since that fjord is a central geographical feature of the municipality. The first element is the genitive case of the old (uncompounded) name of the fjord: Matr. That name is identical to the word matr which means "food". The last element is fjǫrðr which means "fjord" or "firth". Therefore, the meaning of the name is "the fjord that's full of food (fish)". The village of Matre lies at the inner end of the fjord, and that name has a similar origin.

=== Coat of arms ===
The coat of arms was granted on 28 September 1990. The official blazon is "Gules, three clasps Or in pall" (Norwegian: På raud grunn tre gule heldrer stilte i trepass). This means the arms have a red field (background) and the charge is three heldrer, traditional tools made of wood for fastening a rope around a load. The charge has a tincture of Or which means it is commonly colored yellow, but if it is made out of metal, then gold is used. They are meant to symbolize unity as well as the importance of forestry. The arms were designed by Rune Garmann. The municipal flag has the same design as the coat of arms.

=== Churches ===
The Church of Norway has one parish (sokn) within Masfjorden Municipality. It is part of the Nordhordland prosti (deanery) in the Diocese of Bjørgvin. Prior to 2020, the municipality had three parishes (Frøyset, Sandnes, and Solheim), but in 2020, they were merged into one parish.

Churches in Masfjorden Municipality
Parish (sokn)	Church name	Location of the church	Year built
Masfjorden	Frøyset Church	Frøyset	1937
Masfjorden	Sandnes Church	Masfjordnes	1845
Masfjorden	Solheim Church	Solheim	1881

== Government ==
Masfjorden Municipality is responsible for primary education (through 10th grade), outpatient health services, senior citizen services, welfare and other social services, zoning, economic development, and municipal roads and utilities. The municipality is governed by a municipal council of directly elected representatives. The mayor is indirectly elected by a vote of the municipal council. The municipality is under the jurisdiction of the Hordaland District Court and the Gulating Court of Appeal.

=== Municipal council ===
The municipal council (Kommunestyre) of Masfjorden Municipality is made up of 17 representatives that are elected to four year terms. The tables below show the current and historical composition of the council by political party.

Masfjorden kommunestyre 2023–2027
Party name (in Nynorsk)	Number of representatives
Labour Party (Arbeidarpartiet)	4
Progress Party (Framstegspartiet)	2
Conservative Party (Høgre)	7
Centre Party (Senterpartiet)	3
Liberal Party (Venstre)	1
Total number of members:	17

Masfjorden kommunestyre 2019–2023
Party name (in Nynorsk)	Number of representatives
Labour Party (Arbeidarpartiet)	4
Progress Party (Framstegspartiet)	1
Conservative Party (Høgre)	7
Christian Democratic Party (Kristeleg Folkeparti)	1
Centre Party (Senterpartiet)	4
Total number of members:	17

Masfjorden kommunestyre 2015–2019
Party name (in Nynorsk)	Number of representatives
Labour Party (Arbeidarpartiet)	4
Progress Party (Framstegspartiet)	1
Conservative Party (Høgre)	7
Christian Democratic Party (Kristeleg Folkeparti)	2
Centre Party (Senterpartiet)	2
Liberal Party (Venstre)	1
Total number of members:	17

Masfjorden kommunestyre 2011–2015
Party name (in Nynorsk)	Number of representatives
Labour Party (Arbeidarpartiet)	3
Progress Party (Framstegspartiet)	2
Conservative Party (Høgre)	6
Christian Democratic Party (Kristeleg Folkeparti)	2
Centre Party (Senterpartiet)	2
Liberal Party (Venstre)	2
Total number of members:	17

Masfjorden kommunestyre 2007–2011
Party name (in Nynorsk)	Number of representatives
Labour Party (Arbeidarpartiet)	5
Progress Party (Framstegspartiet)	2
Conservative Party (Høgre)	4
Christian Democratic Party (Kristeleg Folkeparti)	2
Centre Party (Senterpartiet)	2
Liberal Party (Venstre)	2
Total number of members:	17

Masfjorden kommunestyre 2003–2007
Party name (in Nynorsk)	Number of representatives
Labour Party (Arbeidarpartiet)	5
Progress Party (Framstegspartiet)	1
Conservative Party (Høgre)	5
Christian Democratic Party (Kristeleg Folkeparti)	2
Centre Party (Senterpartiet)	2
Liberal Party (Venstre)	2
Total number of members:	17

Masfjorden kommunestyre 1999–2003
Party name (in Nynorsk)	Number of representatives
Labour Party (Arbeidarpartiet)	6
Progress Party (Framstegspartiet)	1
Conservative Party (Høgre)	4
Christian Democratic Party (Kristeleg Folkeparti)	3
Centre Party (Senterpartiet)	2
Liberal Party (Venstre)	1
Total number of members:	17

Masfjorden kommunestyre 1995–1999
Party name (in Nynorsk)	Number of representatives
Labour Party (Arbeidarpartiet)	3
Progress Party (Framstegspartiet)	2
Conservative Party (Høgre)	4
Christian Democratic Party (Kristeleg Folkeparti)	4
Centre Party (Senterpartiet)	2
Liberal Party (Venstre)	2
Total number of members:	17

Masfjorden kommunestyre 1991–1995
Party name (in Nynorsk)	Number of representatives
Labour Party (Arbeidarpartiet)	4
Progress Party (Framstegspartiet)	1
Conservative Party (Høgre)	4
Christian Democratic Party (Kristeleg Folkeparti)	3
Centre Party (Senterpartiet)	4
Liberal Party (Venstre)	1
Total number of members:	17

Masfjorden kommunestyre 1987–1991
Party name (in Nynorsk)	Number of representatives
Labour Party (Arbeidarpartiet)	5
Conservative Party (Høgre)	5
Christian Democratic Party (Kristeleg Folkeparti)	2
Centre Party (Senterpartiet)	2
Joint list of the Liberal Party (Venstre) and Liberal People's Party (Liberale Folkepartiet)	2
Non-political municipal list (Upolitisk bygdeliste)	1
Total number of members:	17

Masfjorden kommunestyre 1983–1987
Party name (in Nynorsk)	Number of representatives
Labour Party (Arbeidarpartiet)	5
Conservative Party (Høgre)	5
Christian Democratic Party (Kristeleg Folkeparti)	3
Centre Party (Senterpartiet)	2
Liberal Party (Venstre)	1
Cross-party common list (Tverrpolitisk samlingsliste)	1
Total number of members:	17

Masfjorden kommunestyre 1979–1983
Party name (in Nynorsk)	Number of representatives
Labour Party (Arbeidarpartiet)	4
Conservative Party (Høgre)	3
Christian Democratic Party (Kristeleg Folkeparti)	3
Centre Party (Senterpartiet)	3
Liberal Party (Venstre)	2
Cross-party common list (Tverrpolitisk Samlingsliste)	2
Total number of members:	17

Masfjorden kommunestyre 1975–1979
Party name (in Nynorsk)	Number of representatives
Labour Party (Arbeidarpartiet)	2
Christian Democratic Party (Kristeleg Folkeparti)	4
Centre Party (Senterpartiet)	3
Cross-party common list (Tverrpolitisk Samlingsliste)	6
Total number of members:	15

Masfjorden kommunestyre 1971–1975
Party name (in Nynorsk)	Number of representatives
Labour Party (Arbeidarpartiet)	1
Local List(s) (Lokale lister)	14
Total number of members:	15

Masfjorden kommunestyre 1967–1971
Party name (in Nynorsk)	Number of representatives
Labour Party (Arbeidarpartiet)	2
Centre Party (Senterpartiet)	5
Local List(s) (Lokale lister)	8
Total number of members:	15

Masfjorden kommunestyre 1963–1967
Party name (in Nynorsk)	Number of representatives
Labour Party (Arbeidarpartiet)	2
Conservative Party (Høgre)	1
Centre Party (Senterpartiet)	5
Local List(s) (Lokale lister)	7
Total number of members:	15

Masfjorden heradsstyre 1959–1963
Party name (in Nynorsk)	Number of representatives
Labour Party (Arbeidarpartiet)	2
Conservative Party (Høgre)	1
Centre Party (Senterpartiet)	4
Local List(s) (Lokale lister)	8
Total number of members:	15

Masfjorden heradsstyre 1955–1959
Party name (in Nynorsk)	Number of representatives
Labour Party (Arbeidarpartiet)	1
Joint List(s) of Non-Socialist Parties (Borgarlege Felleslister)	8
Local List(s) (Lokale lister)	6
Total number of members:	15

Masfjorden heradsstyre 1951–1955
Party name (in Nynorsk)	Number of representatives
Local List(s) (Lokale lister)	14
Total number of members:	14

Masfjorden heradsstyre 1947–1951
Party name (in Nynorsk)	Number of representatives
Local List(s) (Lokale lister)	14
Total number of members:	14

Masfjorden heradsstyre 1945–1947
Party name (in Nynorsk)	Number of representatives
Local List(s) (Lokale lister)	14
Total number of members:	14

Masfjorden heradsstyre 1937–1941*
Party name (in Nynorsk)	Number of representatives
Local List(s) (Lokale lister)	14
Total number of members:	14
Note: Due to the German occupation of Norway during World War II, no elections were held for new municipal councils until after the war ended in 1945.

=== Mayors ===
The mayor (Nynorsk: ordførar) of Masfjorden Municipality is the political leader of the municipality and the chairperson of the municipal council. Here is a list of people who have held this position:

- 1879–1880: Erik A. Riisnæs
- 1880–1883: Kristen T. Bergsvik
- 1884–1889: Thorbjørn Frølich
- 1890–1895: Rasmus M. Haugsvær
- 1896–1899: Torgeir R. Haugsvær
- 1900–1901: Rasmus M. Haugsvær
- 1901–1916: Hans Bergersen Wergeland
- 1917–1919: Ivar R. Eikemo
- 1920–1941: Martin H. Matre
- 1942–1945: Gjert Daae
- 1945–1945: Magnus Maurstad
- 1945–1945: Martin H. Matre
- 1945–1955: Magnus Halsøy
- 1955–1963: Johannes R. Mjanger (KrF)
- 1963–1975: Gunnar Daae (LL)
- 1975–1979: Arne A. Hope (LL)
- 1979–1983: Albert A. Kjetland (Sp)
- 1983–1987: Einar Kvinge (H)
- 1987–1999: Kjell Sverre Løvik (H)
- 1999–2003: Helge Haukeland (Ap)
- 2003–2011: Håkon Matre (H)
- 2011–2023: Karstein Totland (H)
- 2023–present: Erlend Kvamsdal (H)

== Geography ==
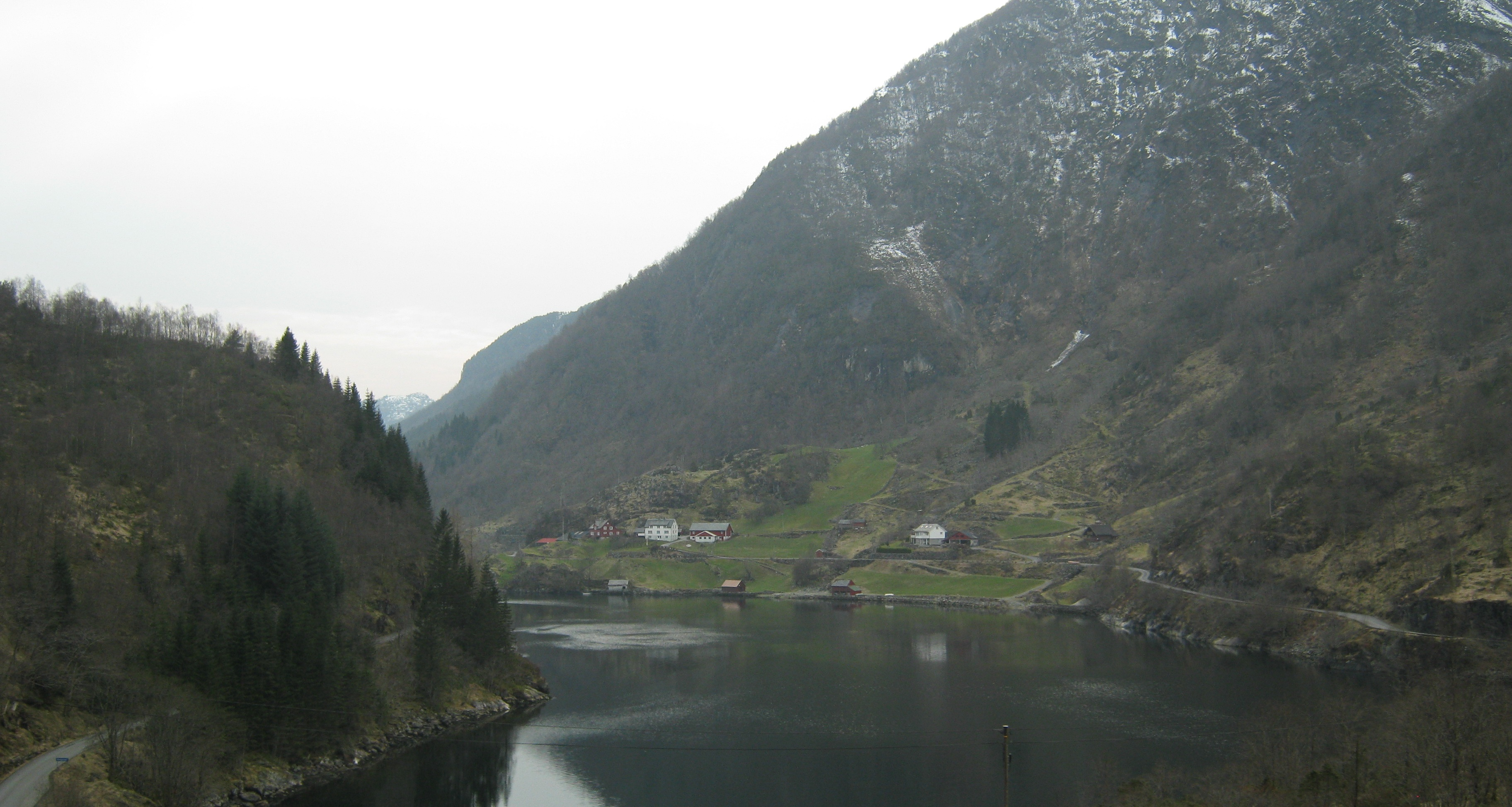
View of the fjord in eastern Masfjorden

Masfjorden Municipality lies to the east of the Fensfjorden and Austfjorden. The Masfjorden runs east to west bisecting the municipality. The eastern part has mountains and as one heads westward, the land levels out before reaching the fjord in the east. The highest point in the municipality is the 1,070.89-metre (3,513.4 ft) tall mountain ridge Årsdalsryggen, which runs southwards from Høyanger Municipality and into Masfjorden Municipality.

The municipality lies along the west coast in the central part of the county. Gulen Municipality and Høyanger Municipality lie to the north, Modalen Municipality to the east, and Alver Municipality lies to the south and west.

The European route E39 highway runs through eastern Masfjorden Municipality heading north and south. The 4.1-kilometre (2.5 mi) long Masfjord Tunnel and the 2.5-kilometre (1.6 mi) long Jernfjell Tunnel (and a few other tunnels) are part of the E39 highway which winds its way through some valleys in the mountainous eastern region of Masfjorden.

== Population ==
Historical population
Year	1879	1891	1900	1910	1920	1930	1946	1951	1960	1970	1980	1990	2000	2010	2020	2023
Pop.	2,336	2,336	2,277	2,252	2,240	2,059	1,995	1,928	1,987	1,858	1,915	1,891	1,774	1,635	1,691	1,654
±% p.a.	—	+0.00%	−0.28%	−0.11%	−0.05%	−0.84%	−0.20%	−0.68%	+0.34%	−0.67%	+0.30%	−0.13%	−0.64%	−0.81%	+0.34%	−0.73%
Source: Statistics Norway and Norwegian Historical Data Centre

== Notable people ==
- Hans Bergersen Wergeland (1861–1931), a Norwegian politician, local mayor, and farmer
- Ludvig Hope (1871–1954), a lay preacher, writer, and teacher
- Einar Hope (born 1937), an economist
- Bjarne Johannes Hope (1944–2006), a civil servant
