= Masfjorden (fjord) =

Fjord in Vestland, Norway

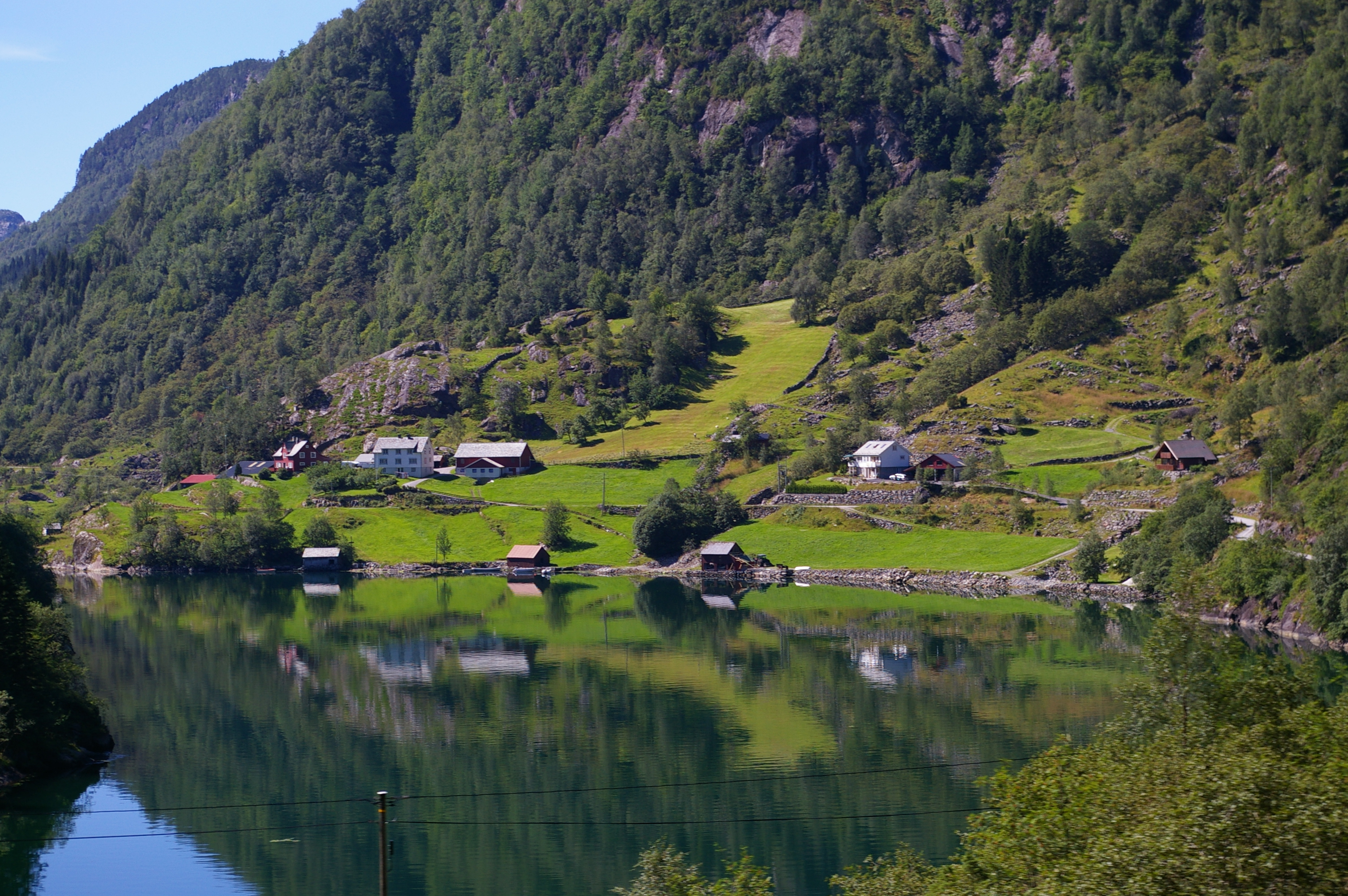
- View of the inner part of the fjord
- Interactive map of Masfjorden
- Location: Vestland county, Norway
- Coordinates: 60.87067°N 5.37116°E
- Type: Fjord
- Primary outflows: Austfjorden
- Basin countries: Norway
- Max. length: 24 kilometres (15 mi)
- Max. width: 500 to 1,500 metres (1,600 to 4,900 feet)
- Max. depth: 494 metres (1,621 ft)
- Settlements: Masfjordnes, Solheim, Haugsvær, Matre

Masfjorden is a fjord in Masfjorden Municipality in Vestland county, Norway. The 24-kilometre (15 mi) long fjord flows to the west and empties into the Austfjorden, the inner part of the Fensfjorden. It is separated from Austfjorden by a 75 metres (246 ft) deep sill and has a maximum depth of 494 metres (1,621 ft).

The fjord is generally about 500 to 1,500 metres (0.31 to 0.93 mi) wide. The innermost part of the fjord splits into two branches at the village of Solheim with the Matrefjorden going to the southeast to the village of Matre and the Haugsværfjorden going to the northeast to the village of Haugsvær. The village of Matre and the European route E39 highway sits at the innermost part of the fjord.

There are no bridges over the fjord, but there is one regular cable ferry route near the mouth of the fjord in the east. The ferry runs from the village of Masfjordnes in the south to Duesund in the north, a distance of just less than 800 metres (2,600 ft).

== See also ==
- List of Norwegian fjords
