= Kildal =

Kildal is a surname. Notable people with the surname include:

- Arne Kildal (1885–1972), Norwegian author, librarian and civil servant
- Birger Kildal (1849–1913), Norwegian attorney and businessman
- Karl Kildal (1881–1932), Norwegian equestrian
- Peter Kildal (bobsleigh) (born 1975), Norwegian bobsledder
- Peter Daniel B. W. Kildal (1816–1881), Norwegian politician
- Peter Wessel Wind Kildal (1814–1882), Norwegian merchant and industrialist
