= Peter Kildal =

Peter Kildal may refer to:

- Peter Kildal (bobsleigh) (born 1975), Norwegian bobsledder
- Peter Daniel B. W. Kildal (1816–1881), Norwegian politician
- Peter Wessel Wind Kildal (1814–1882), Norwegian merchant and industrialist
