= Well-boat =

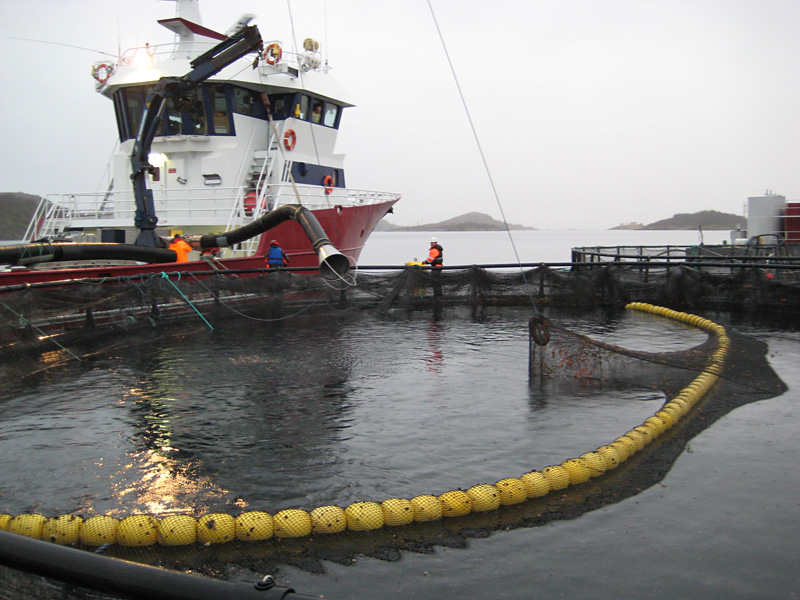
A modern well-boat picks up salmon at the Norwegian Aquaculture Center in Toft, Brønnøy Municipality, Norway.

A well-boat is a fishing vessel with a well or tank for the storage and transport of live fish. The term well-boat or well smack was first used in the 17th century. Before modern refrigeration methods, well-boats allowed for the delivery of live fish to port.

Contemporary well-boats are used in the extensive aquaculture industry. These vessels can be used to transport smolt to sea, to bring them from aquaculture sites for processing and to sort and delouse fish.

== See also ==
- Well smack, a type of well-boat
