= Feios Church =

Church in Vestland, Norway

- Feios kyrkje
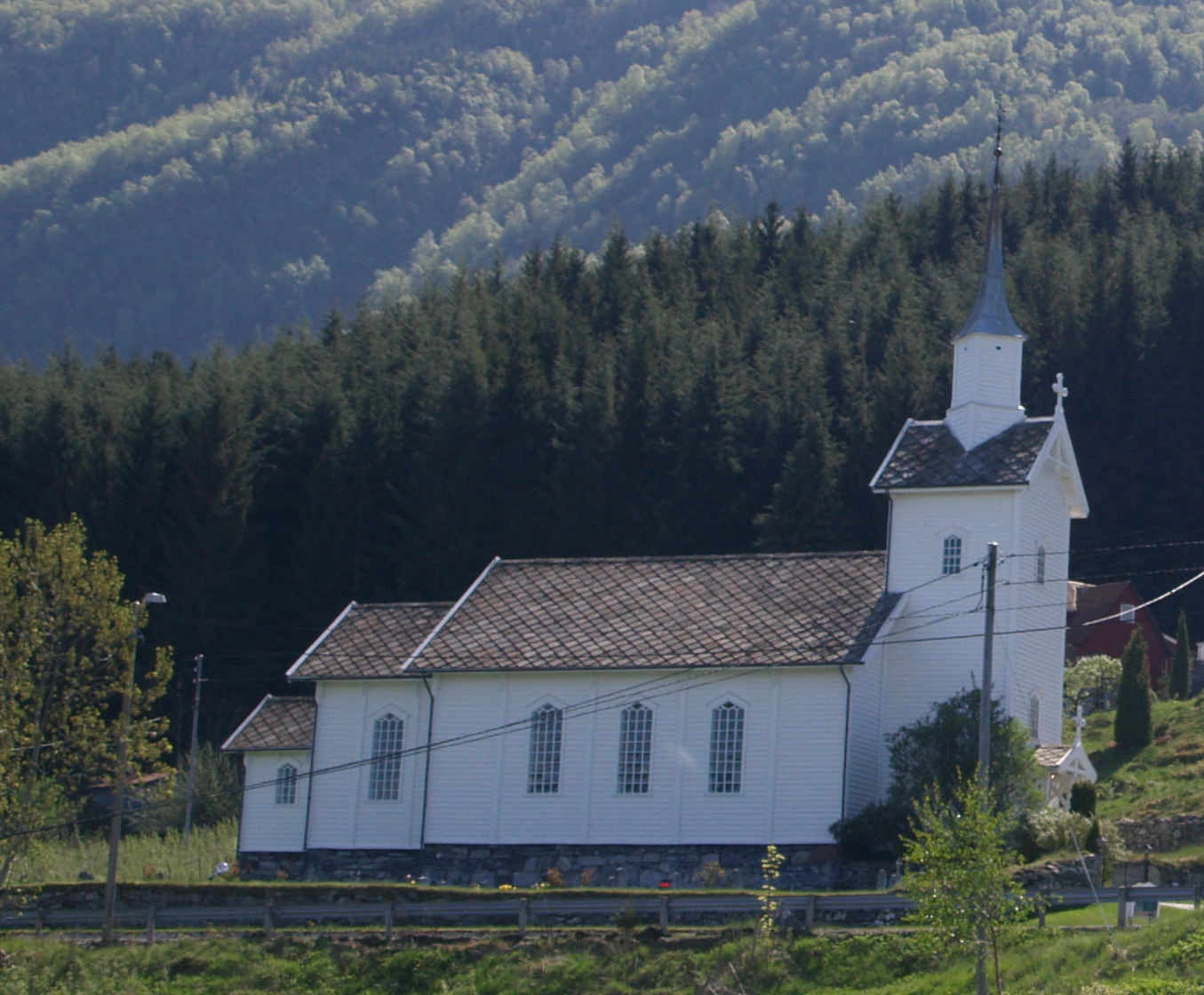
- View of the church
- Feios Church
- 61°08′57″N 6°45′36″E
- Location: Vik Municipality, Vestland
- Country: Norway
- Denomination: Church of Norway
- Previous denomination: Catholic Church
- Churchmanship: Evangelical Lutheran

History
- Status: Parish church
- Founded: 12th century
- Consecrated: 12 December 1866

Architecture
- Functional status: Active
- Architect: Jacob Wilhelm Nordan
- Architectural type: Long church
- Style: Swiss chalet style
- Completed: 1866 (160 years ago)

Specifications
- Capacity: 220
- Materials: Wood

Administration
- Diocese: Bjørgvin bispedømme
- Deanery: Sogn prosti
- Parish: Feios
- Norwegian Cultural Heritage Site
- Type: Church
- Status: Listed
- ID: 84121

Feios Church (Norwegian: Feios kyrkje) is a parish church of the Church of Norway in Vik Municipality in Vestland county, Norway. It is located in the village of Feios, along the southern shore of the Sognefjorden. It is the church for the Feios parish which is part of the Sogn prosti (deanery) in the Diocese of Bjørgvin. The white, wooden church was built in a long church design in 1866 using plans drawn up by the architect Jacob Wilhelm Nordan. The church seats about 220 people.

== History ==
The earliest existing historical records of the church date back to the year 1322, but the church was not new that year. The first church was likely a wooden stave church that was likely built during the first half of the 12th century. The church was a rectangular building with a tower in the west. The building measured about 22.5 by 7 metres (74 ft × 23 ft). Over the centuries, the church was renovated, but by the 1860s, it was decided that the old church would be torn down and a new church would be built on the same site. The new building was designed by Jacob Wilhelm Nordan in 1864 and Johannes Øvsthus was hired to be the lead builder for the project. It was a long church with a west tower, rectangular nave and choir with a sacristy extension. The new church was consecrated on 12 December 1866 by Bishop Peter Hersleb Graah Birkeland. The church interior has a Swiss chalet style.

== Media gallery ==
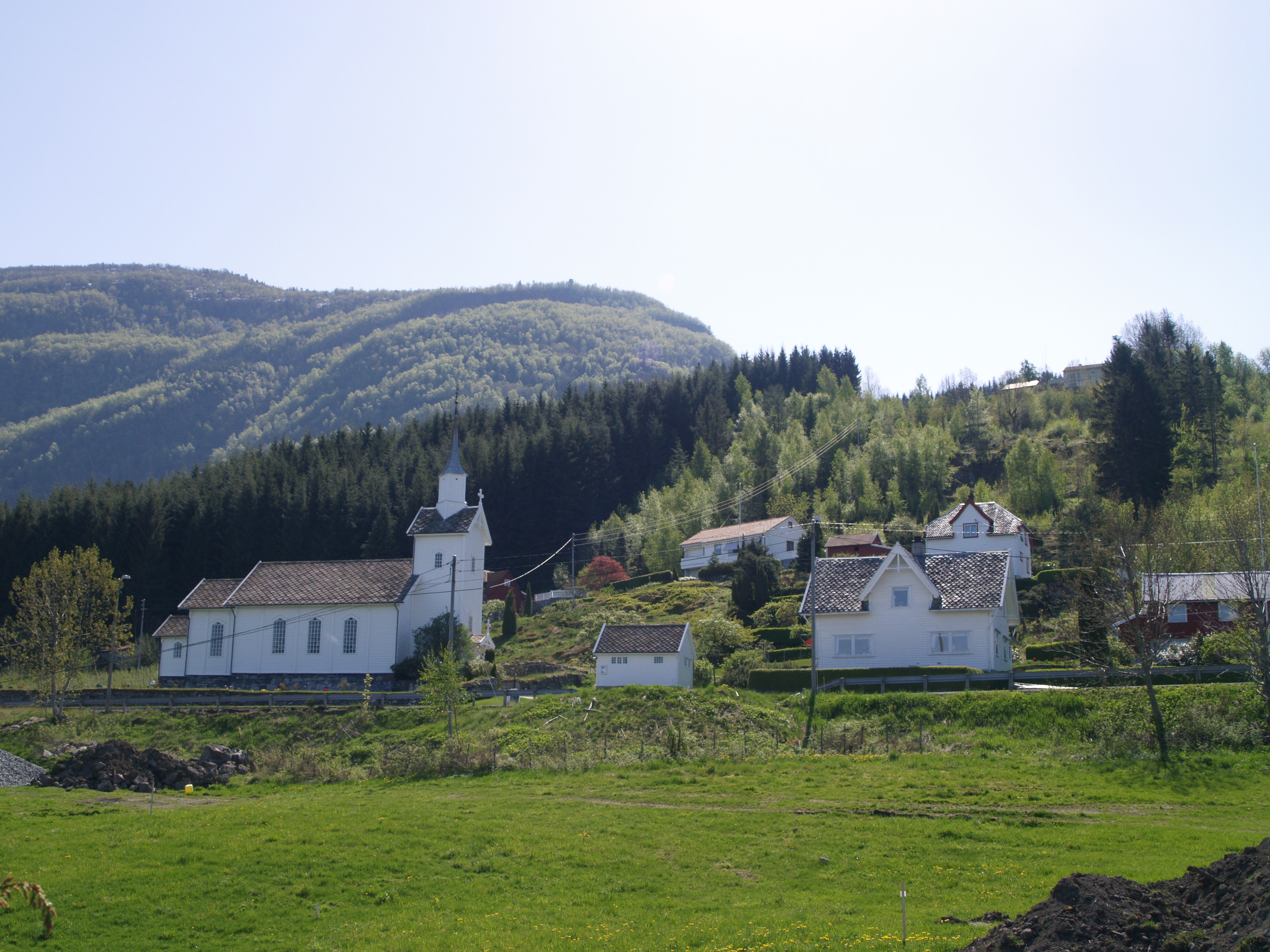

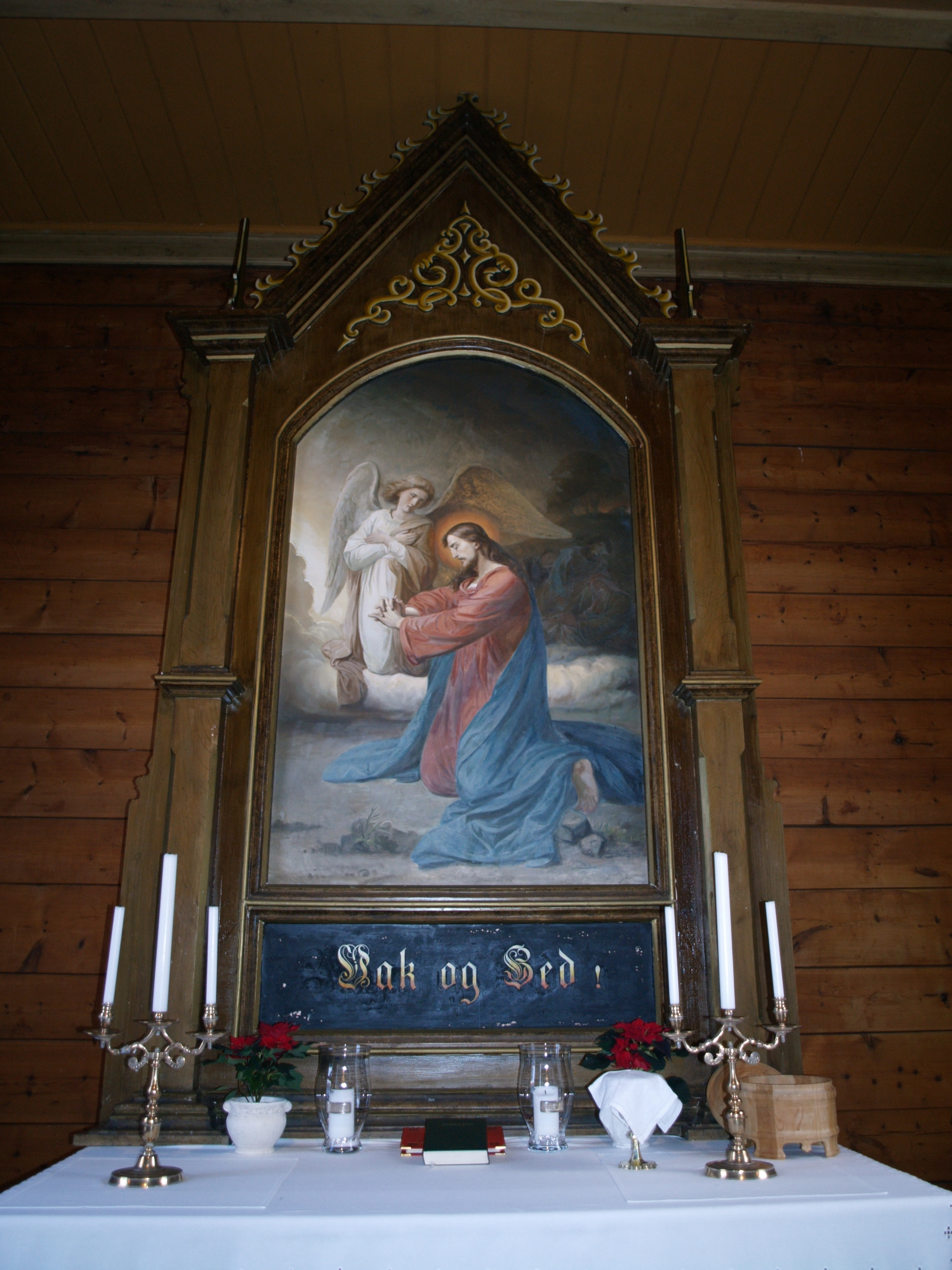

== See also ==
- List of churches in Bjørgvin
