= Petter Furberg =

Norwegian politician

Petter Furberg (15 December 1923 in Sande – 22 June 1999) was a Norwegian politician for the Labour Party.

He was elected to the Norwegian Parliament from Vestfold in 1969, and was re-elected on two occasions.

On the local level, he was a member of Horten municipal council from 1953 to 1971. He chaired the municipal party chapter from 1971 to 1974.

From 1981 to 1990 he was appointed Auditor General of Norway.

Political offices
Preceded by Tor O. Oftedal	Auditor General of Norway; 1981–1990	Succeeded by Bjarne Mørk Eidem
