= National Audit Office of Norway =

- Type: Government agency
- Industry: Auditing
- Founded: 1816
- Headquarters: Oslo, Norway
- Area served: Norway
- Key people: Karl Eirik Schjøtt-Pedersen (Chairman)
- Number of employees: approx 450 (2023)
- Parent: Parliament of Norway
- Website: www.riksrevisjonen.no

The National Audit Office of Norway (Norwegian: Riksrevisjonen) is the state auditor of the Government of Norway and directly subordinate of the Parliament of Norway. It is responsible for auditing, monitoring and advising all state economic activities, including financial audits, performance audits and monitor the management of the state's proprietary interests in companies. Located in Oslo, it is led by a board of five auditors general elected for four years and from 2022 it has been led by Karl Eirik Schjøtt-Pedersen. It is regulated by the Act of the Office of the Auditor General of 2025..

The office has about 425 employees, mostly recruited among economists, lawyers and social scientists.

== History ==
The office dates back to 1814 when the Constitution of Norway §75 stated that there were to be appointed five auditors by the Parliament of Norway with the first auditors being appointed in 1816. In 1822 the Ministry of Auditing (Revisjonsdepartementet) was created as a supplement to the office that originally bore the name Statsrevisjonen (lit. the State Auditing). When the current Parliament of Norway Building opened in 1866 the office followed along and stayed in the building until 1890. In 1918, the system is changed and all state auditing is taken over by the office, removing the ministry. In 1938, with 64 against 63 votes, the Parliament of Norway changed the office's name to the current Riksrevisjonen (lit. the National Auditing). In 1962, the auditing of the Norwegian State Railways, Telegrafverket and the Postal Service were included in the office.

== Auditor Generals ==
The Auditor General is the head of the Office.

- 1816–1821 : Marcus S. Lyng
- 1821–1827 : Frederik Motzfeldt
- 1827–1834 : Lauritz Nicolai Kraft
- 1827–1845 : Peter L. Stabel
- 1834–1846 : Søren Anton Wilhelm Sørenssen
- 1848–1854 : Johan D. Rye
- 1854–1881 : Peter Daniel B. W. Kildal
- 1882–1883 : Peder Krabbe Gaarder
- 1883–1898 : Hagbard Berner
- 1898–1923 : Svend Borchmann Hersleb Vogt
- 1923–1925 : Tore Embretsen Aaen
- 1926–1949 : Hans T. H. Lütken
- 1949–1950 : Saamund Olsen Bergland
- 1950–1978 : Lars Breie
- 1978–1980 : Tor Oftedal
- 1981–1990 : Petter Furberg
- 1990–2005 : Bjarne Mørk Eidem
- 2005–2013 : Jørgen Kosmo
- 2014–2021: Per-Kristian Foss
- 2022–Present: Karl Eirik Schjøtt-Pedersen
