= Tor Oftedal =

Norwegian politician

Tor Oftedal (born 14 January 1925 in Sandnes, died 5 October 1980) was a Norwegian politician for the Labour Party.

He was elected to the Norwegian Parliament from Buskerud in 1969, and was re-elected on two occasions. During the third term he died and was replaced by Aase Moløkken.

The son of newspaper editor Tjøl Oftedal, he started his career as a journalist, and later became editor-in-chief of Fritt Slag 1951-1952 and Fremtiden 1964–1969. He was the Auditor General of Norway from 1978 to his death. He was also deputy board chairman of the Norwegian Agency for Development Cooperation from 1971 to 1972 and member of the council of the Norwegian Institute of International Affairs from 1974 to 1978.

Political offices
Preceded by Lars Breie	Auditor General of Norway; 1978–1980	Succeeded by Petter Furberg
