= Peder Krabbe Gaarder =

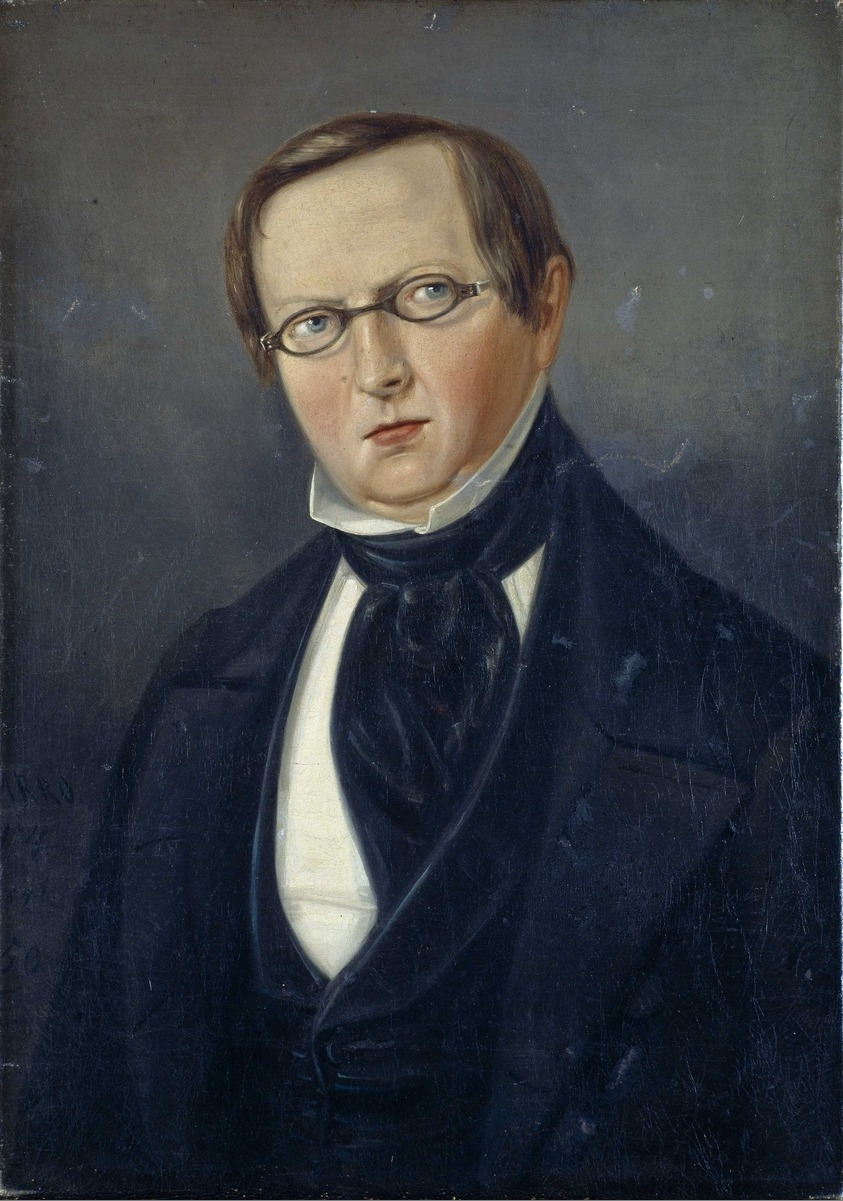
Peder Krabbe Gaarder

Peder Krabbe Gaarder (23 April 1814 – 5 August 1883) was a Norwegian jurist and political theorist.

He was born at Alsten in Nordland county, Norway. He studied law at the University of Christiania (now University of Oslo), graduating in 1838. He was appointed legal consult in Christiania from 1847 and served as state auditor general from 1851.

As a political theorist on constitutional law he weighted popular sovereignty over separation of powers. He published Fortolkninger over Grundloven og de øvrige Love, som danne Norges Riges offentlige Ret in 1845 and Om den Norske Constitution. Modbemærkninger til B. Dunkers Skrift om samme Gjenstand in 1846.

Despite favoring the revolutionary Marcus Thrane movement, which peaked around 1850, he was hired at the Office of the Auditor General of Norway from 1851. He was later promoted to Auditor General of Norway from 1882 to his death in 1883.

Preceded by Peter Daniel B. W. Kildal	Auditor General of Norway; 1882–1883	Succeeded by Hagbard Berner
