= Lars Breie =

Norwegian jurist, auditor and politician

Lars Breie (3 April 1907 – 5 October 1999) was a Norwegian jurist, auditor and politician for the Labour Party.

He was elected to the Norwegian Parliament from Buskerud in 1945, and was re-elected on one occasion.

Born in Ål, he was and deputy mayor of Ål municipality from 1937 to 1940, and was mayor for brief periods in 1940 and 1945.

Outside politics he graduated as cand.jur. in 1933. From 1933 to 1948 he was a lawyer in Ål. From 1950 to 1978 Breie was appointed Auditor General of Norway. He was also an auditor for the United Nations, OECD, ILO, Pan American Health Organization, WHO.

Political offices
Preceded by Saamund O. Bergland	Auditor General of Norway; 1950–1978	Succeeded by Tor O. Oftedal
