= Jørgen Kosmo =

Norwegian politician (1947–2017)

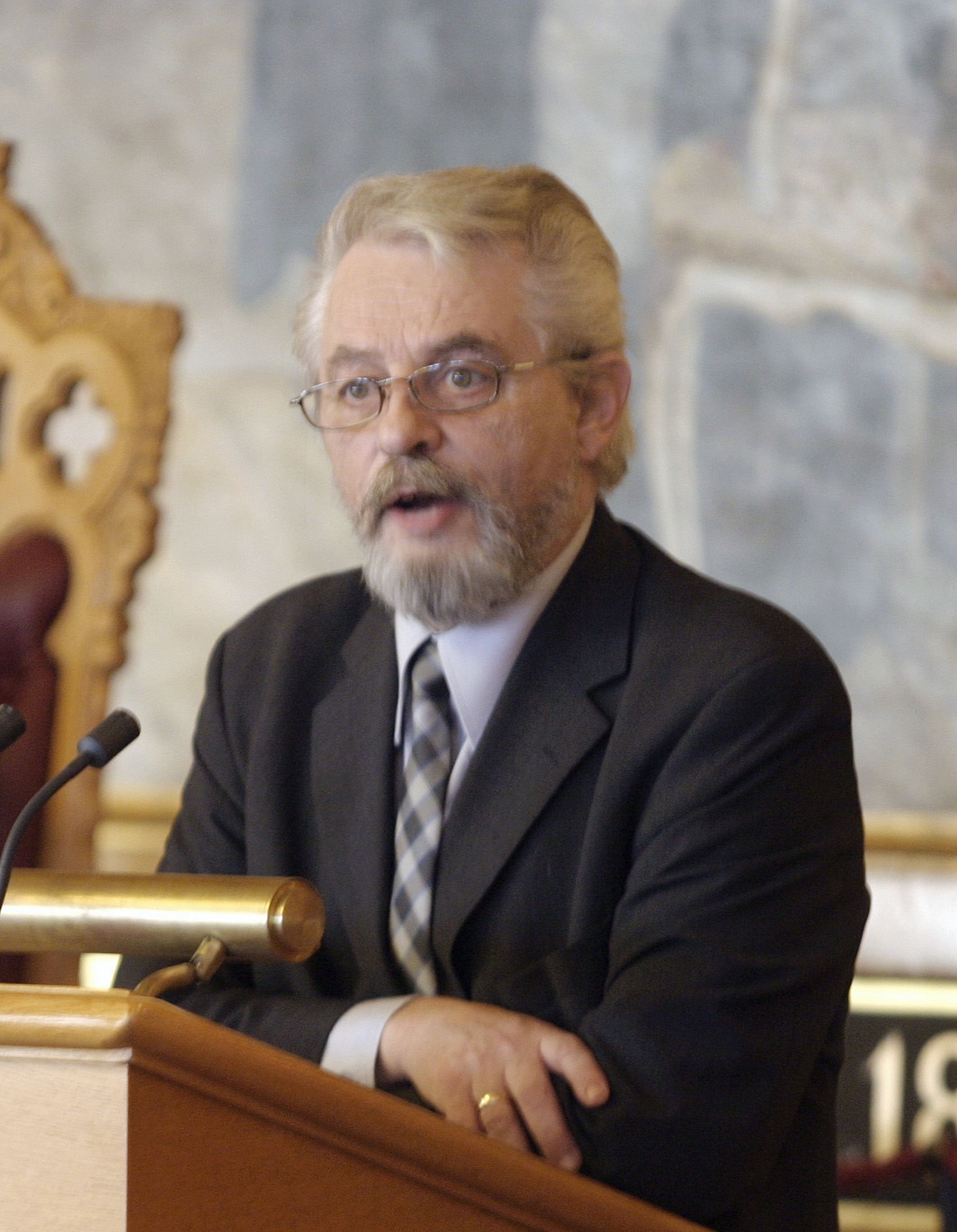

Auditor General of Norway
- In office 1 October 2005 – 30 September 2013
- Prime Minister: Kjell Magne Bondevik; Jens Stoltenberg
- Preceded by: Bjarne Mørk Eidem
- Succeeded by: Per-Kristian Foss

Minister of Defence
- In office 2 April 1993 – 17 October 1997
- Prime Minister: Gro Harlem Brundtland; Thorbjørn Jagland
- Preceded by: Johan Jørgen Holst
- Succeeded by: Dag Jostein Fjærvoll

Minister of Labour and Government Administration
- In office 17 March 2000 – 5 October 2001
- Prime Minister: Jens Stoltenberg
- Preceded by: Laila Dåvøy
- Succeeded by: Victor D. Norman

Minister of Nordic Cooperation
- In office 17 March 2000 – 5 October 2001
- Prime Minister: Jens Stoltenberg
- Preceded by: Kåre Gjønnes
- Succeeded by: Svein Ludvigsen

President of the Storting
- In office 9 October 2001 – 30 September 2005
- Prime Minister: Jens Stoltenberg; Kjell Magne Bondevik
- Vice President: Inge Lønning
- Preceded by: Kirsti Kolle Grøndahl
- Succeeded by: Thorbjørn Jagland

Member of the Norwegian Parliament
- In office 1 October 1985 – 30 September 2005
- Constituency: Vestfold

Mayor of Horten
- In office 1 January 1984 – 1 October 1985
- Preceded by: Ragnar Heitun
- Succeeded by: Ove Bjørkavåg

Personal details
- Born: Jørgen Hårek Kosmo; 5 December 1947 Fauske, Nordland, Norway
- Died: 24 July 2017 (aged 69)
- Party: Labour
- Spouse: Anne Lise Sætermo (m. 1967)

Jørgen Hårek Kosmo (5 December 1947 – 24 July 2017) was a Norwegian politician. From 2005 to 2013 he was Auditor General of Norway, after representing the Labour Party in the Storting (parliament) for 20 years, of which the final 4 years were as President of the Storting.

Kosmo was Minister of Defence from 1993 to 1997 and Minister of Labour and Government Administration from 2000 to 2001. He was member of the legislature Storting from 1985 to 2005 and served as President of the Storting (speaker) from 2001 to 2005. Kosmo was in 2004 appointed County Governor of Telemark, but could not take over the position while he was member of parliament.

By profession Jørgen Kosmo was a construction worker. He held positions of trust in the Norwegian Confederation of Trade Unions (1974–75) and the Norwegian Union of Building Workers (1979–83). From 1979 to 1985 he was member of the municipal council of Horten Municipality, the last 2 years as mayor.

Political offices
Preceded by Johan Jørgen Holst	Minister of Defence; 1993–1997	Succeeded by Dag Jostein Fjærvoll
Preceded by Laila Dåvøy	Minister of Labour and Administration; 2000–2001	Succeeded by Victor Norman
Preceded by Kirsti Kolle Grøndahl	President of the Storting; 2001–2005	Succeeded by Thorbjørn Jagland
Preceded by Bjarne Mørk Eidem	Auditor General of Norway; 2005–2013	Succeeded by Per-Kristian Foss
