= Edgar J. March =

British writer of books on sailing boats (1897–1971)

Edgar J. March M.S.N.R., A.R.I.N.A.
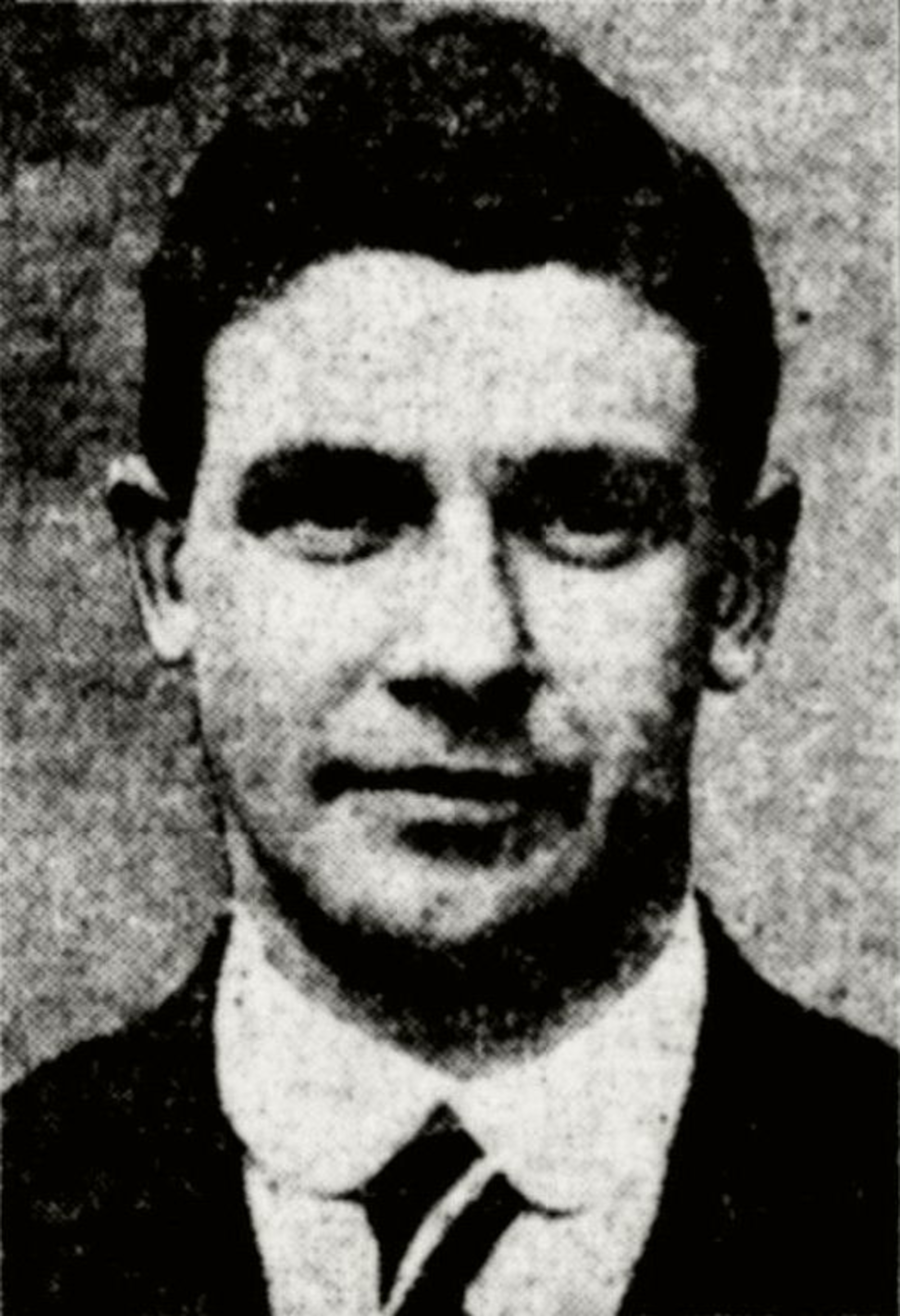
- March in 1929
- Born: Edgar James March; 5 September 1897; Ramsgate, England
- Died: 22 July 1971 (aged 73); Isle of Wight, England
- Occupations: Artist; special constable; lecturer; historian; writer
- Writing career
- Years active: 1914–1971
- Genres: Ships; Seamanship
- Notable works: Spritsail Barges of Thames and Medway; Sailing Trawlers; Sailing Drifters; Inshore Craft of Britain in the Days of Sail and Oar

Signature
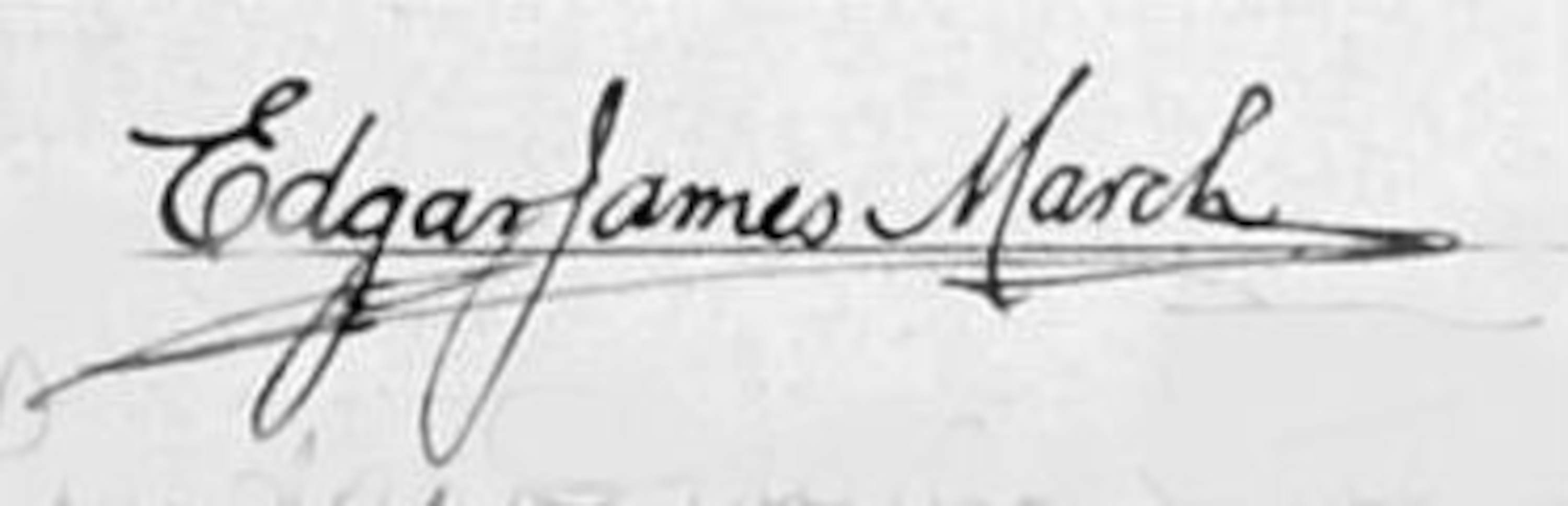

Edgar James March (5 September 1897 – 22 July 1971) was an English writer, lecturer and historian of traditional British sailing craft.

March began his career during the The First World War as a draughtsman for the Air Ministry, and after the war he exhibited watercolour paintings of aeroplanes in action. However he had grown up on the Thanet coast in Kent, where he regularly witnessed working sailing ships, and a fisherman taught him to sail. So from around 1920 to the end of his life he was researching traditional British, wooden, working sailing craft which operated inshore and at sea. This research continued in tandem with his 25-year lecturing career, in which he brought to the public films, lantern slides and histories of sailing boats. For his generation in the United Kingdom, working sailing craft were already almost completely gone from the waters. By 1950 he had amassed a collection of over 15,000 lantern slides of lost or soon-to-be lost sail-driven fishing and cargo boats, which were about to be overtaken by motor vessels.

From 1948, March published six heavily detailed volumes laying out the history and construction of sailing barges, sailing drifters, sailing trawlers, British destroyers, and finally two volumes covering his life's research on inshore craft of the British Isles. His published works contain memories and photographs dating from the 1860s to the dates of publication. The books include scale drawings and construction plans of the vessels, which are sufficiently detailed for the use of model-makers. Of March's book, Sailing Drifters, the Lynn Advertiser comments, "The 191 photographs portray a way of life now gone for ever and likely to have vanished unrecorded had not Edgar J. March striven to collect information stored in the wise old heads of a generation now well into the evening of its day".

== Early and personal life ==
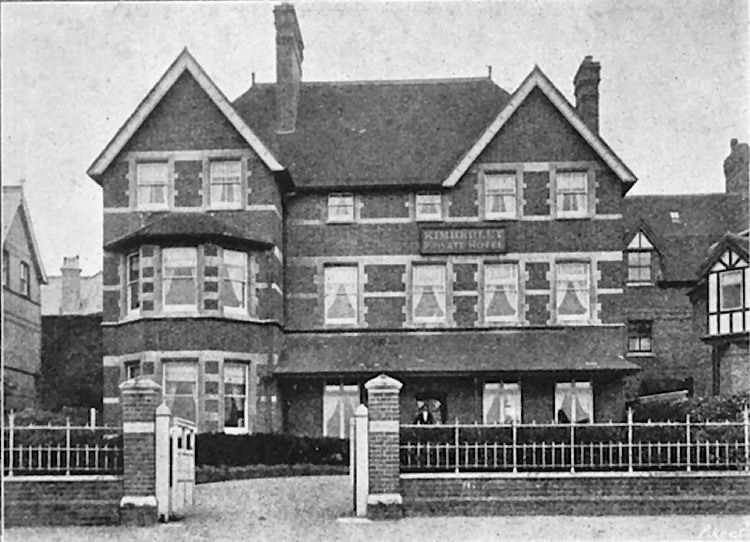
Kimberley Hotel, Westgate

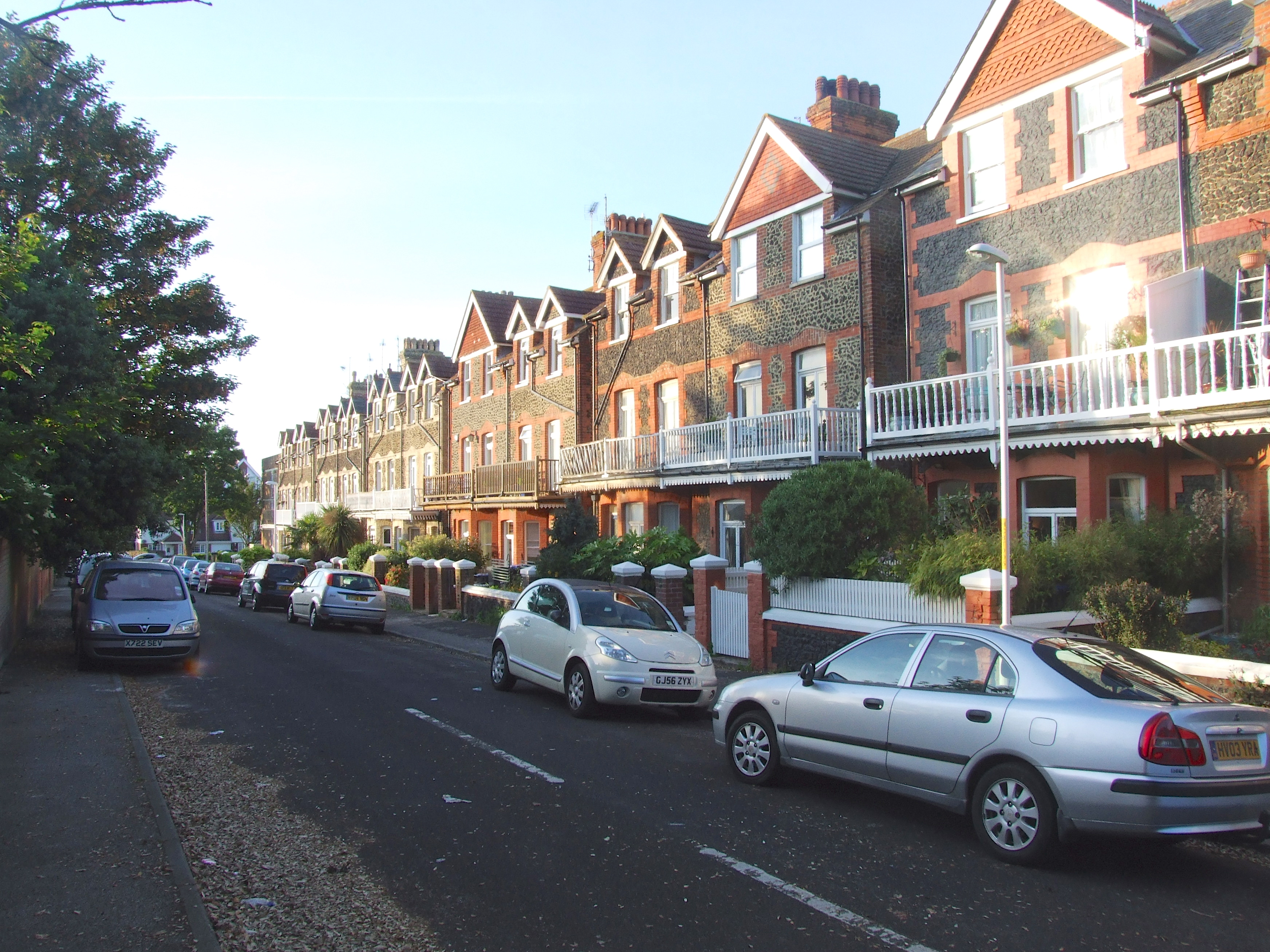
Cedric Road, Westgate-on-Sea, March's home for 50 years

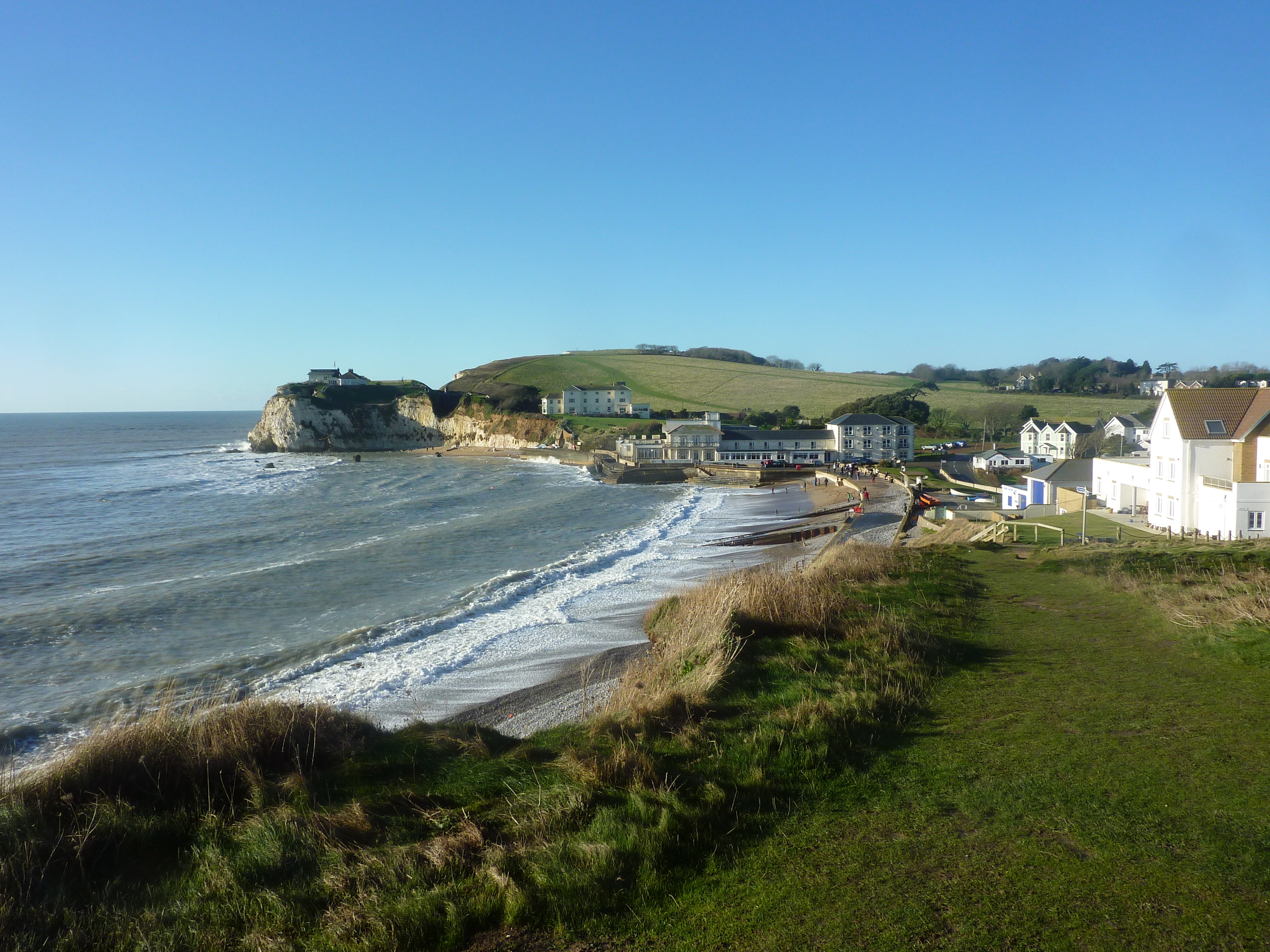
Freshwater, Isle of Wight

March's father was William March, a butler, (Note: 1891 England Census. Osberton (South Lodge), Retford Road, Worksop. RG12/2644. Page 7/85. Schedule 35 (H.M. Government). Quote: William March described as domestic servant butler, born in South Luffenham, Rutland. Only William and Lissie March are listed at that address) who became a seaside hotelier. (Note: William March (Luffenham, Rutland 1855 – Westgate-on-Sea 22 January 1936). GRO index: Births Jun 1855 March William Uppingham 7a 252. Deaths Mar 1936 March William 80 Thanet 2a 1755. William March died at the Kimberley Hotel, Westgate.) (Note: 1911 England Census. Kimberley, Sea Road, Westgate on Sea, Kent. 63/04/4486 (H.M. Government) His mother was Lizzie "Lissie" March née Barr, daughter of William Barr, who was a groom and postilion for the Earl of Craven, (Note: 1851 England Census (H.M. Government)) and later a farmer. (Note: Lizzie "Lissie" March née Barr (born Shrivenham, Berkshire, 1862). GRO index: Births Jun 1862 Barr Lizzie Faringdon 2c 244. Marriages Dec 1888 Barr Lizzie and March William Leighton B 3b 837. Marriage certificate says " All Saints, Leighton Buzzard, 17 October 1888, father William Barr, a farmer". Lissie Barr was baptised as Lizzie on 8 June 1862 at St Mary the Virgin church, Ashbury, Berkshire. See Berkshire Baptisms Index. Ashbury, Berkshire, England. Lizzie Barr in 1862 (Church of England). Quote. Parents William and Elizabeth Barr. Father's profession: groom. Father's residence Ashdown Park Lodge.) (Note: 1911 England Census. Kimberley, Sea Road, Westgate on Sea, Kent. 63/04/4486 (H.M. Government) William and Lissie March were married at the Church of All Saints, Leighton Buzzard on 17 October 1888. (Note: England, Select Marriages, 1888 (Church of England)) Between at least 1901 and 1921 they were running the Kimberley Hotel, a 22-room seaside boarding house, in Westgate-on-Sea, with a resident cook and housemaid. (Note: 1911 England Census. Kimberley, Sea Road, Westgate on Sea, Kent. 63/04/4486 (H.M. Government) (Note: 1901 England Census. Kimberley Hotel, Westgate-on-Sea, Isle of Thanet, Kent. 21/820/69/5/17 (H.M. Government)) (Note: 1921 England Census. Kimberley Hotel, Westgate-on-Sea, Isle of Thanet, Kent.. 2/3/253/Ee/1. Edgar J. March is described as an artist in this census. (H.M. Government)) Guests included Sir Gilbert Parker, MP, and Frederic Wallace Hastings Blake, governor of HM Prison Pentonville. (Note: 1921 England Census. Kimberley Hotel, Westgate-on-Sea, Isle of Thanet, Kent.. 2/3/253/Ee/1. Edgar J. March is described as an artist in this census. (H.M. Government)) In 1935 the Kimberley Hotel, under the management of March assisted by his elderly father, mounted a prizewinning exhibition on the subject of yachting, as part of the Queen Carnival in Westgate. March's uncle, George March, ran the Westcliffe Hotel in Westgate-on-Sea, and was a councillor for Westgate. (Note: 1939 England and Wales Register, schedule 99 (H.M. Government))

March was born on 5 September 1897, at his family's address, the Truro House Hotel, Ramsgate in the Isle of Thanet, Kent, England, (Note: Edgar James March (5 September 1897 – 22 July 1971). GRO index: Births Dec 1897 March Edgar James Thanet 2a 942. Deaths Sep 1971 March Edgar James 5 Se 1897.I.Wight 6b 1974. His birth certificate says: "Fifth September 1897 Truro Hotel Ramsgate U.D.(Urban District)., Edgar James. Father William March hotel proprietor of Truro Hotel Ramsgate, mother Lizzie March formerly Barr".) (Note: 1911 England Census. Kimberley, Sea Road, Westgate on Sea, Kent. 63/04/4486 (H.M. Government) (Note: 1939 England and Wales Register, schedule 99 (H.M. Government)) where his father was the hotel's proprietor. He was baptised on 3 October 1897 at All Saints' Church, Westbere, Kent. (Note: England Select Births and Christenings 1897 (Church of England) Westbere, Kent.) He had an elder brother, William Francis George March, (Note: William Francis George March (Ramsgate, Kent, 1896 – 24 October 1917). Births Mar 1896 March William Francis G. Thanet 2a 930.) (Note: 1911 England Census. Kimberley, Sea Road, Westgate on Sea, Kent. 63/04/4486 (H.M. Government) a 2nd lieutenant of the Royal Flying Corps, (Note: 2/Lieutenant William Francis George MARCH General List and Royal Flying Corps (National Archives)) who died of his wounds in the First World War. (Note: UK, Soldiers Died in the Great War, 1914-1919: records for William Francis George March 1917 (H.M. Government) In Ger Hand Gen Lis. Also see: Commonwealth War Graves Commission Debt Of Honour (showing burial place).) March and his brother were brought up at the Kimberley Hotel in Westgate-on-Sea. (Note: 1911 England Census. Kimberley, Sea Road, Westgate on Sea, Kent. 63/04/4486 (H.M. Government) (Note: 1901 England Census. Kimberley Hotel, Westgate-on-Sea, Isle of Thanet, Kent. 21/820/69/5/17 (H.M. Government)) On 17 October 1929, March married Linda Dorothy Tottenham-Bowman, (Note: Linda Dorothy March née Tottenham-Bowman. (8 August 1903 – 12 November 1979). GRO index: Births Sep 1903 Bowman Linda Dorothy Lewisham 1d 1271. Marriages Dec 1929 March Edgar J. and Linda D. Tottenham-Bowman Thanet 2a 2771. Deaths Dec 1979 March Linda Dorothy 08 Au 1903 Isle of Wight 20 1942. The marriage certificate says: "St Saviour's, Westgate-on-Sea, Kent. Oct 17 1929. Edgar James March of Kimberley, Westgate-on-Sea, lecturer, son of William March, and Linda Dorothy Tottenham-Bowman.of (Rothlin?), Birchington, daughter of Alfred Tottenham-Bowman, deceased.) (Note: England & Wales, National Probate Calendar (Index of Wills and Administrations), 1979, page 5374 Quote. March Linda Dorothy of Eden House Eden Rd Totland Bay Isle of W died 12 November 1979 . Probate Winchester 29 December £31,737 ref.793318059E. (H.M. Government)) at St Saviour's Church, Westgate-on-Sea. By 1939, he and his wife were living in Cedric Road, Margate. (Note: 1939 England and Wales Register, schedule 99 (H.M. Government)) Before they moved to the Isle of Wight, they lived at Sunrays, 3 Cedric Road, Westgate-on-Sea, for more than fifty years. Linda petitioned for divorce from March in 1931, (Note: [Linda Dorothy March in 1931 Archive ref. J 77/2968. Divorce Court file:169. Respondent Edgar J. March. 5. Item ref. J 77/2968/1695. (H.M. Government) ]) however the couple were together again by 1939. (Note: 1939 England and Wales Register, schedule 99 (H.M. Government)) March dedicated his Spritsail Barges (1948) to his wife, thus: "To my wife, who has not minded my love for Kathleen and her sisters'", the dedication being accompanied by March's sketch of the barge Kathleen. March died on the Isle of Wight on 22 July 1971. His last address was Green Acre, Madeira Lane, Colwell, Freshwater, Isle of Wight. (Note: Green Acre is a large house on the corner of Madeira Lane and Colwell Road, in Freshwater, Isle of Wight.) (Note: England and Wales National Probate Calendar 1971, page 70 (H.M. Government) Winchester, England. Quote .March Edgar James of Green Acre Madeira Lane, Colwell Freshwater Isle of Wight. Died 22 July 1971. Probate Winchester 1 November 1971. £4540)

== Career ==
March knew working sailing ships from an early age. He later wrote: "One of my earliest recollections of boyhood days was learning from a bearded fisherman the difference between a mulie barge and a ketch". He was already researching for his future publications during the First World War, saying that "[My] happiest hours in [the] war years [were] those I spent pottering about Whitstable Harbour, obtaining much of the material for [Spritsail Barges]". During his childhood he was familiar with fishing boats too. He wrote in Inshore Craft (1970):

Along the coast the longshore men from Westgate-on-Sea made a living chiefly by taking summer visitors for trips, especially when warships lay in Margate Roads for days at a time. In winter they went drift-netting for herring and sprats, a bitterly cold job in open boats ... The two big herring punts were Edith Mary and Enchantress owned by Chris Case – my friend from boyhood until his death during the [Second World War] – who taught me the difference between all the rigs of sailing vessels in the days when they could be seen every day in the offing ... As a schoolboy I used to walk to Margate, where Chris kept his boat in the harbour, and sail back with him, when he taught me many things.

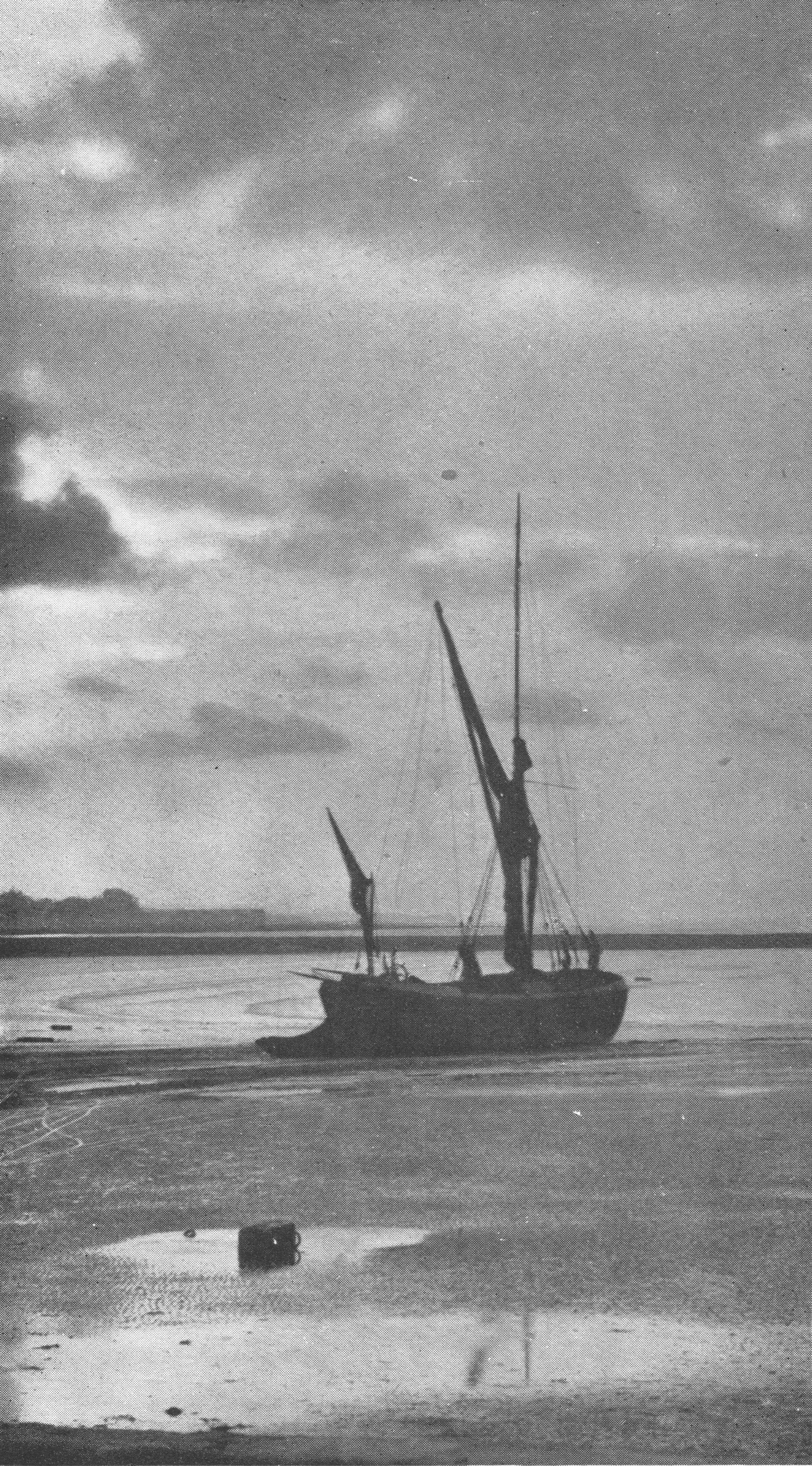
The spritsail barge unloading stone for Sea Road, 1913

By July 1913, when March was around sixteen years old, and was articled to the local district surveyor, a working barge appeared in St Mildred's Bay in front of the Kimberley Hotel. March's employer was ordering the repair of roads in Westgate-on-Sea, and March as a surveyor's apprentice witnessed the barge unloading stone for Sea Road.

Meanwhile, until his first book was published in 1948 when he was over 50 years old, March was continuing his research while earning his living by other means. In 1921, he was working as an artist, (Note: 1921 England Census. Kimberley Hotel, Westgate-on-Sea, Isle of Thanet, Kent.. 2/3/253/Ee/1. Edgar J. March is described as an artist in this census. (H.M. Government)) and he was still being described as an artist in 1950. During the First World War he worked for the Air Ministry and "executed many important drawings for the authorities". In 1920 he exhibited water colour action paintings of war planes and sea planes, in Trafalgar Square, Westgate. However March's brother, an airman, had died in 1917 of his wounds in the First World War, and March was disillusioned with aeroplanes. He later wrote in Spritsail Barges, "I cannot help thinking that the world would have been a happier place if aircraft had remained dreams instead of becoming nightmares". By 1939 he was working as a hotelier and lecturer, and was also serving as a special constable, number 53, in Margate Borough. (Note: 1939 England and Wales Register, schedule 99 (H.M. Government)) He was elected as a councillor for Westgate in 1938.

=== War reserve constable ===
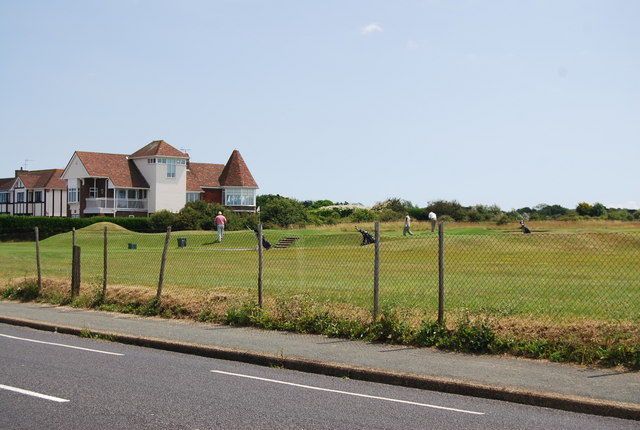
The golf course on Sea Road, Westgate-on-Sea

March was employed as a war reserve constable during the Second World War, when in plain clothes he arrested a burglar who was looting evacuated properties in Sea Road, Westgate, and after the offender punched March in the face, a chase began across the local golf course, together with another policeman. The burglar, a soldier Private Ernest Hipkiss, was again arrested and taken to the police station, pending a court appearance. The court heard the following from March:

War Reserve Constable March said he was on duty in plain clothes in Sea Road on November 24th when he saw the accused looking about. He kept him under observation ... he heard a noise coming from the rear of a house and then saw the accused ... [March] went with the accused to the rear of the house, saw a scullery window open, a pane of glass broken, and a stone on the sill. He then told accused he was a police officer and asked him to produce his pay book. The accused immediately hit him on the left cheek with his fist. Witness fell back and the accused fell on top of him. A struggle ensued and the accused broke away. [March] followed him and seized him again and raised his stick ... [Hipkiss ran away] ... [March] borrowed a bicycle and rode after him.

Following a chase with the assistance of Police Constable Farley and a second arrest, Hipkiss was charged with theft and assault and sentenced to eighteen months' imprisonment.

=== Researcher ===
From the 1920s, March was occupied with the research which was to become the basis for his series of nautical books. He frequently appealed for information via newspapers. In 1928 he wrote to The Bioscope to appeal for "films of square-rigged ships or barques under sail". (Note: Sadly, the present location of March's historically important film and lantern slide collection is unknown.)

In 1944, March was asking readers of the Thanet Advertiser for information about the Ramsgate sailing fleet. In 1946 and 1949, he was writing to the Banffshire Advertiser, asking for information about fifies and zulus. Also in 1946, he wrote similarly to the John O' Groats Journal, and to the Hull and East Yorkshire Times and Hull Daily Mail about fleets on the Humber and the Dogger Bank. In 1947, he was writing to the Cornish Guardian for information on Cornish luggers for his Sailing Drifters book. Public awareness of his research was prompting consciousness of loss of the old traditions and the need to preserve records.

=== Lecturer ===
March travelled the country and lectured about marine matters for several decades. The following list demonstrates the breadth of his subject matter. In October 1925, March was one of the visiting lecturers taking part in the Hull University Lecture series at the Royal Institution in Hull.

In January 1926, at Garston, Merseyside, March took part in the Garston Free Lectures series with his "Salving of Ships" lantern slide lecture. This offered him a "rare opportunity to describe the wonderful apparatus for retrieving the damage done to shipping during gale and fog, and by the ravages of war. The sinking of valuable ships and almost priceless cargoes in the submarine attack on Britain's commerce in the Great War was dealt with, and many of the remarkable inventions that resulted from the crisis then experienced". A Garston newspaper reader D.L.H. added that, "March told of many ways of doing the work, and exciting and dangerous work it is. He told of the wonderful work done by the divers too. It was a splendid lecture by a fine lecturer. Every item of interest was explained so well". In the same month, March gave his "Salving of Ships" lecture in Belper, Derbyshire. The Belper News reported that he "proved a wonderfully fluent speaker who never hesitated for a word. For an hour and a half he spoke with scarcely a moment's hesitation, every word being clearly and loudly spoken, an achievement not often attained by other speakers". On 30 January 1926, he was at Bedford, giving his "Ships Throughout the Ages" lecture. In October 1926, in Dunstable he gave his "Salving of Ships" lecture which was described by the Luton News as "an interesting account of how many ships that had apparently become wrecked beyond help of salvage had eventually been saved". In November 1926, he twice gave his "Ships Throughout the Ages" lecture at Liverpool with lantern illustrations. In December 1926, March lectured at Runnacleave Hall, Ilfracombe, on "Ships Throughout the Ages", and this prompted a local councillor to tell of Barnstaple-built ships which once carried wool to Australia.

In February 1927, March gave his "Ships Throughout the Ages" lecture in Hull. In December 1927, March gave his "Ships Throughout the Ages" lantern lecture at the Smethwick Institute, which was then in Worcestershire.

In 1928, he gave a lecture on "Ocean Cables" and showed a "special film" to Brighouse Sunday Lecture Society, in Brighouse, West Yorkshire. In the same year he gave an untitled lecture as part of Edinburgh's winter philosophical programme, organised by the Edinburgh Philosophical Insititution. In November 1928, he gave a lecture for the Bodmin Free Library Lectures Committee on "Ships and Shipbuilding" with limelight illustrations. In December of that year, he gave a lantern slide lecture whose title was to be oft repeated for later lectures: "The Salving of Ships". On this occasion, the lecture contents included "recovering gold from the Laurentio; raising a 24,000-ton battleship; work on the scuttled German fleet, etc". In the same month, he gave his "Ships Throughout the Ages" talk with lantern slides at the former Stoll Picture Theatre in Kingsway, London.

In January 1929, in the "spacious" and "thronged" RDS theatre in Ballsbridge, Dublin, March gave his "Ships Throughout the Ages" talk with lantern slides as part of a children's lecture course. The lantern show began with people riding on trunks of trees and early British coracles, and continued through Norman and mediaeval shipbuilding. There followed the development from the ships of Columbus and of Henry VII to the great liners of the 1920s. However he "devoted a considerable portion of his discourse" to yacht racing, perhaps as light relief for the children. At that time, motor ships were superseding sail and steam, but March said "this would bring renewed activity to the shipyards". In November 1929, he gave another lecture on "The Salvaging of Ships" at the Barn Theatre, Oxted. The Kent and Sussex Courier noted that the lecture was "profusely illustrated with beautiful lantern slides".

On 8 February 1930, March gave a lecture on the salving of ships to the Sittingbourne Paper Mills Club, at their club house in Sittingbourne, Kent, and gave the same talk to the Thanet Shiplovers Society in 1950. In 1936 and 1937, March gave more lectures. He was described as a "noted marine engineer" when on 12 March 1936, he gave a lecture to St Ninian's Literary Guild in Angus, Scotland, on the recent building of the Cunard-White Star Liner, the RMS Queen Mary in John Brown's Yard, Clydebank. He showed lantern slides including the "laying of the giant keel ... the bending of the great girders that form the ribs of the ship ... Mr March's astronomical figures left the audience almost gasping at times". At the behest of the Committee of the Markinch Institute, he gave a similar lecture to a "large audience" in Markinch town hall in January 1937. In that month he gave the same lecture in the Stoll Picture Theatre, Newcastle, having been invited by Tyneside Lecture Society.

In 1940, March abandoned plans to lecture in Dublin; not due to wartime conditions but because of illness. In 1949 he gave a lantern slides lecture on "Ships Throughout the Ages" to the Whitstable Historical Society. By 1950, he owned over 15,000 lantern slides on "nautical matters".

=== Published writer ===
March published his first book in 1948, and his last in 1970. His Sailing Drifters of 1952 is dedicated to, "the tens of thousands of fishermen, known unto God, who sleep in the deep waters or in churchyards hard by the sea".

In 1954, as president of the Thanet Shiplovers, March presented copies of Sailing Drifters and Sailing Trawlers to Prince Philip, Duke of Edinburgh. In the same year, during a world conference on fishing in the United States of America, 150 copies of his Sailing Trawlers were bought by attendees. He signed off his final publication, Inshore Craft, thus:

Men skilled in the knowledge of how to make the best use of wind and tide are rapidly passing away, but I shall always be proud to have known many of them and to have recorded something of their way of life before it was too late.

== Associations ==
March was a member of the Society for Nautical Research. He was also an Associate of the Royal Institution of Naval Architects. In 1949 he became the first president of the Thanet Shiplovers, or Shiplovers' Society, in Margate, Kent.

== Works ==
March had written both Sailing Drifters and Sailing Trawlers by 1951, but there were publication delays.

- March, Edgar J. (1948). Spritsail Barges of Thames and Medway (1 ed.). London: Percival Marshall.
- March, Edgar J. (1952). Sailing Drifters (1 ed.). London: Percival Marshall & Co..
- March, Edgar J. (1953). Sailing Trawlers: the Story of Deep-sea Fishing with Long Line and Trawl (1 ed.). London: Percival Marshall & Co..
- March, Edgar J. (1966). British Destroyers: a history of development, 1892-1953 (1 ed.). London: Seeley Service.
- March, Edgar J. (1970). Inshore Craft of Britain in the Days of Sail and Oar (1 ed.). Newton Abbot, England: David and Charles. in 2 volumes. March was working on this book from at least 1951. Reprinted in 2005.
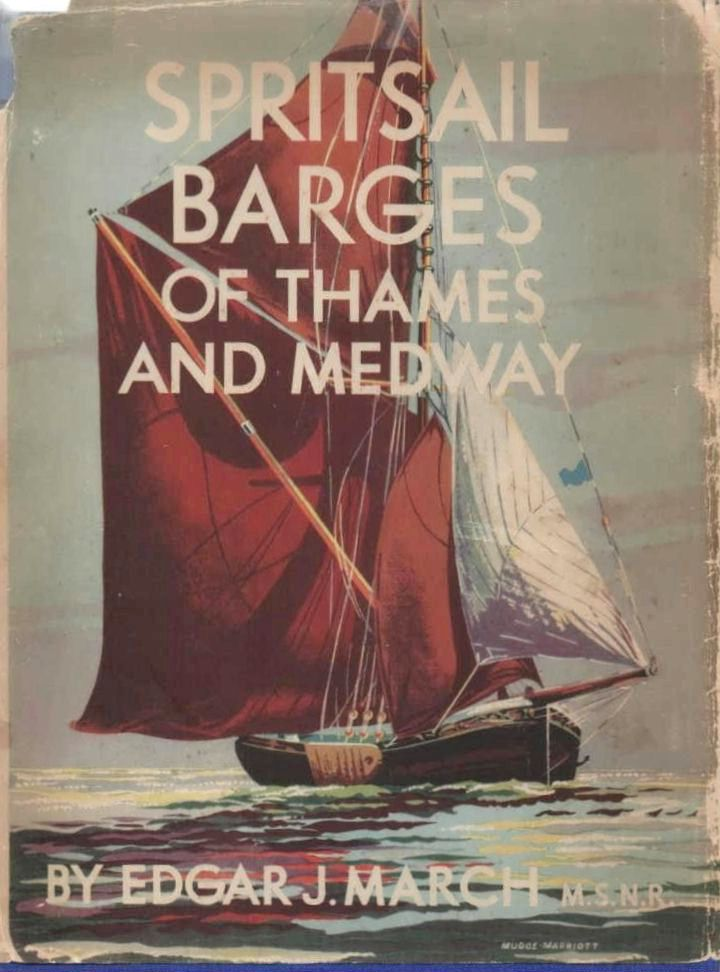
Spritsail Barges of Thames and Medway (1948)

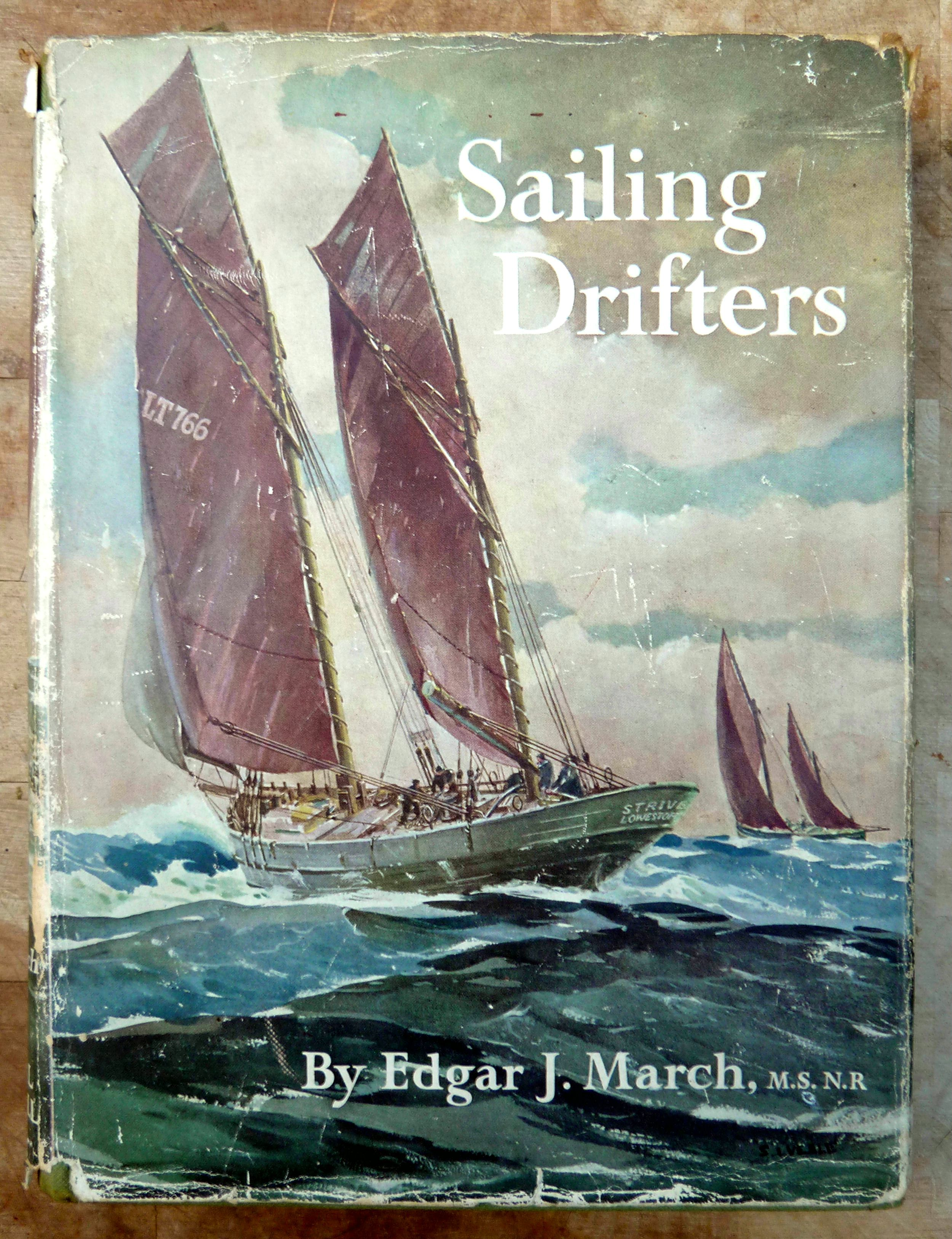
Sailing Drifters (1952)

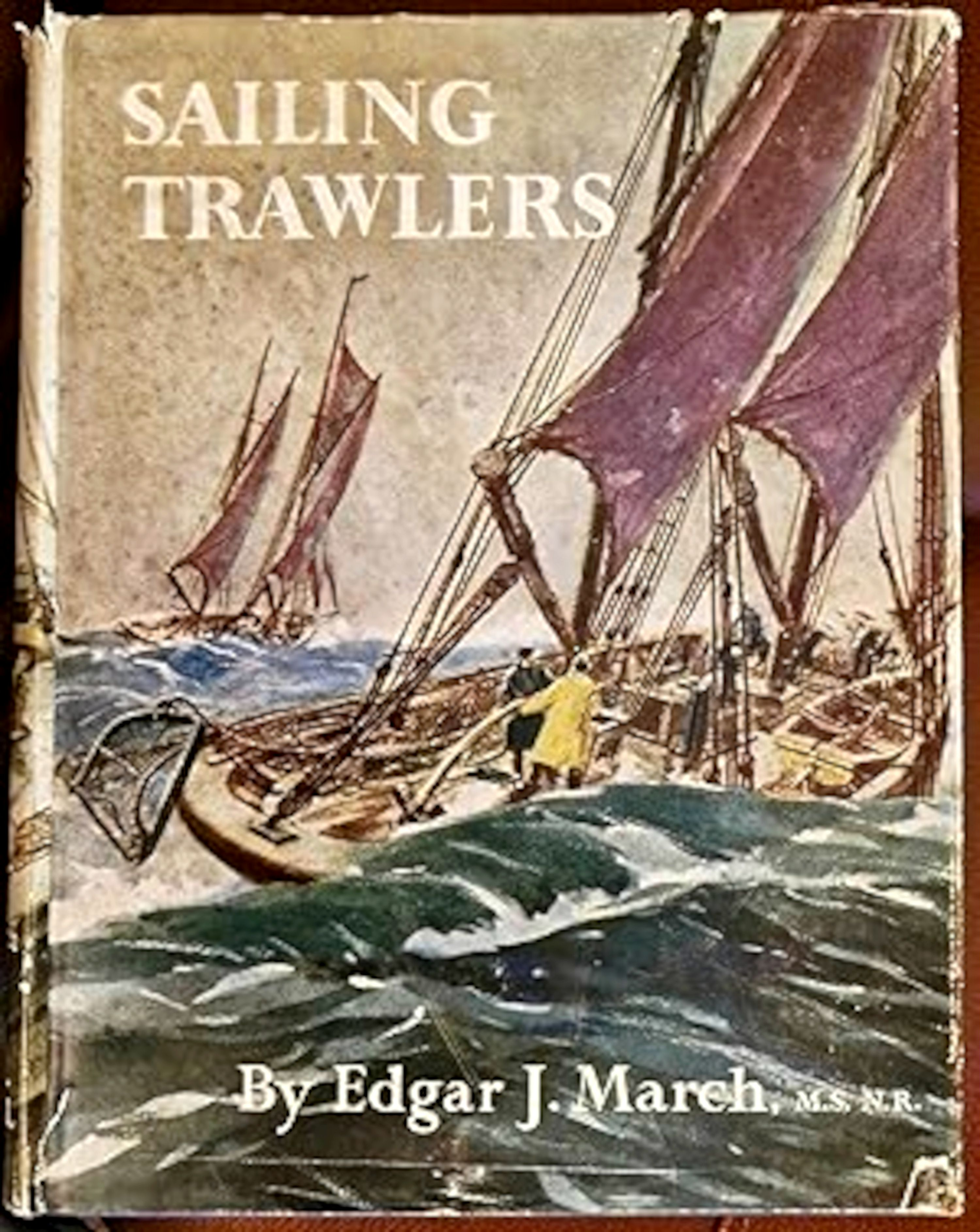
Sailing Trawlers (1953)

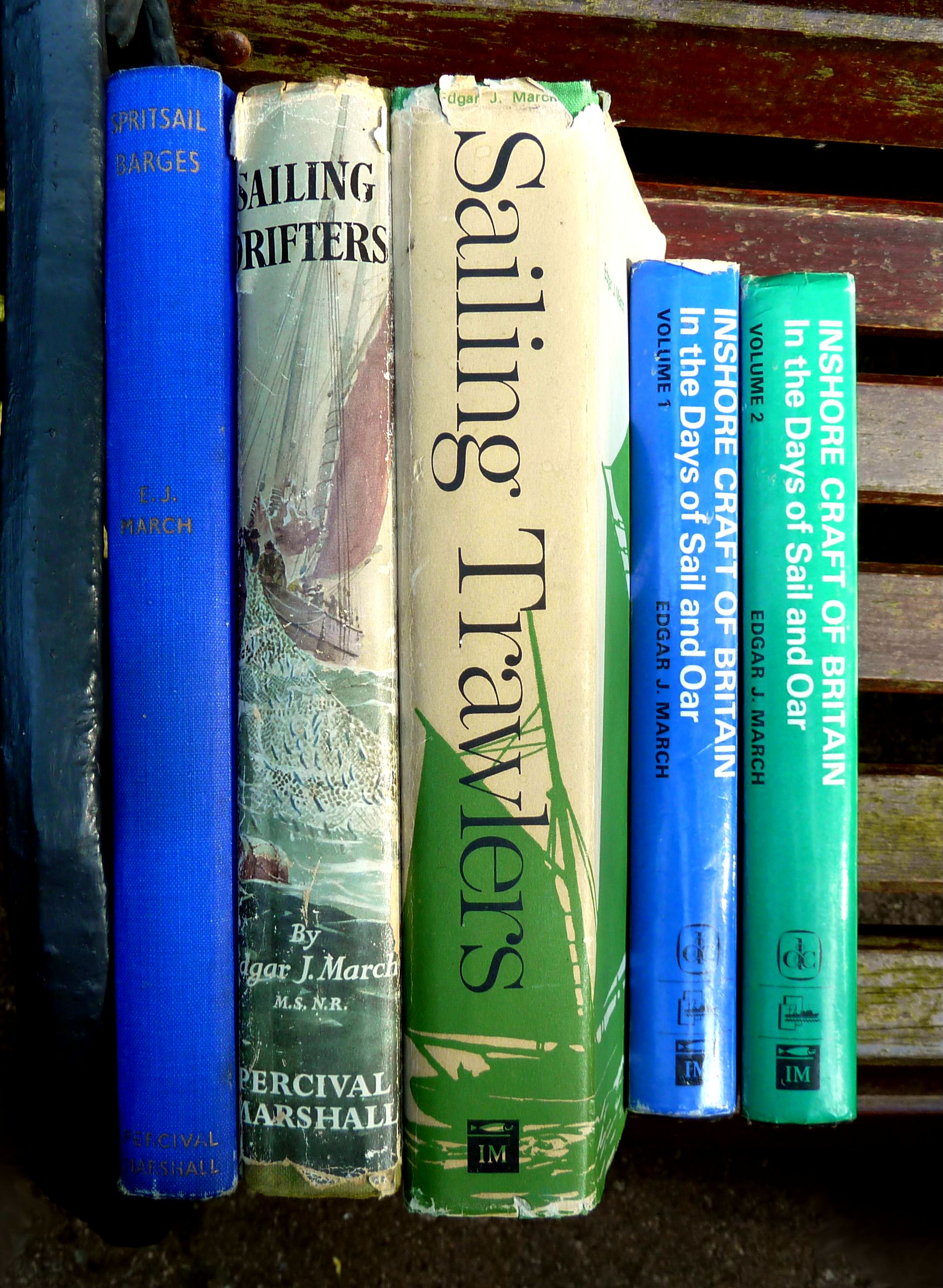
Books by March

== Responses and reviews ==
As the reviews and comments below demonstrate, March was a "well-known fishing-ship historian" from the publication of Spritsail Barges in 1948 to the end of his life.

=== Model-making ===
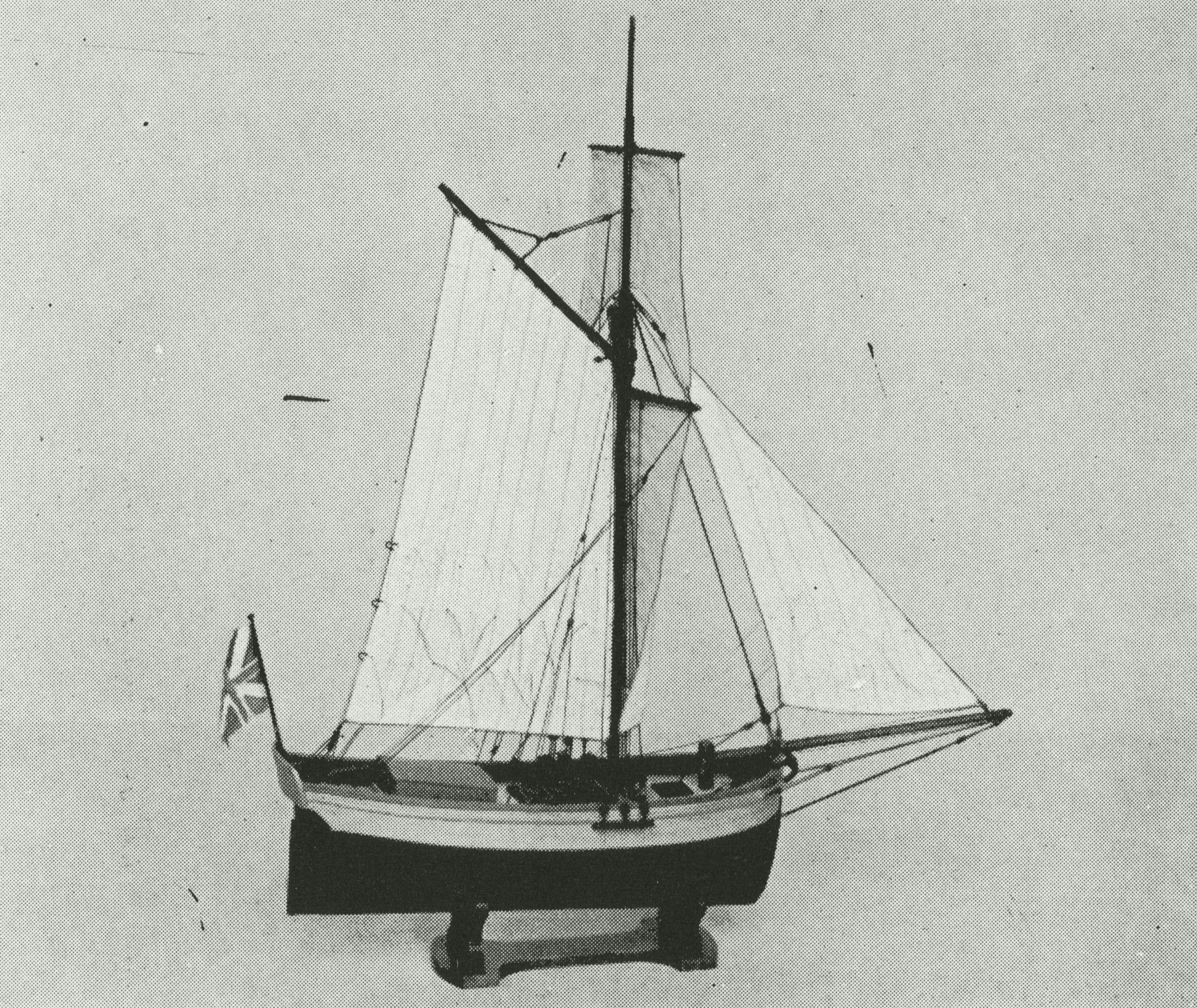
Model of a well smack (photograph from Sailing Trawlers)

One of the public responses to March's work was to use his books as an information source for ship modelling. This is unsurprising, since March was a ship-modeller himself, and chapter 12 of his Spritsail Barges (1948) features 31 pages of details and drawings on that subject. Ship-modeller Mavis Chambers says that "her childhood interest in these ships was nurtured by the writings of Edgar J. March ... His descriptions of life aboard the vessels caught her imagination". Michael and Mollie Hardwick comment, "[March] will be well remembered wherever Kent waters flow, and we are sure that his delightful, yet most detailed work, will attract as many enthusiastic letters from admirers and modellers of the old craft and nostalgic ones from old bargemen now ashore, as it did when it first appeared. In 1967 an Austrian boy was inspired by a picture in March's Sailing Trawlers to build a model of the 1885 paddle tug Aid. Modeller Captain David Bray made several models from March's plans, including one of the 1920 Rye sailing trawler Master Hand.

=== On Spritsail Barges of the Thames and Medway ===
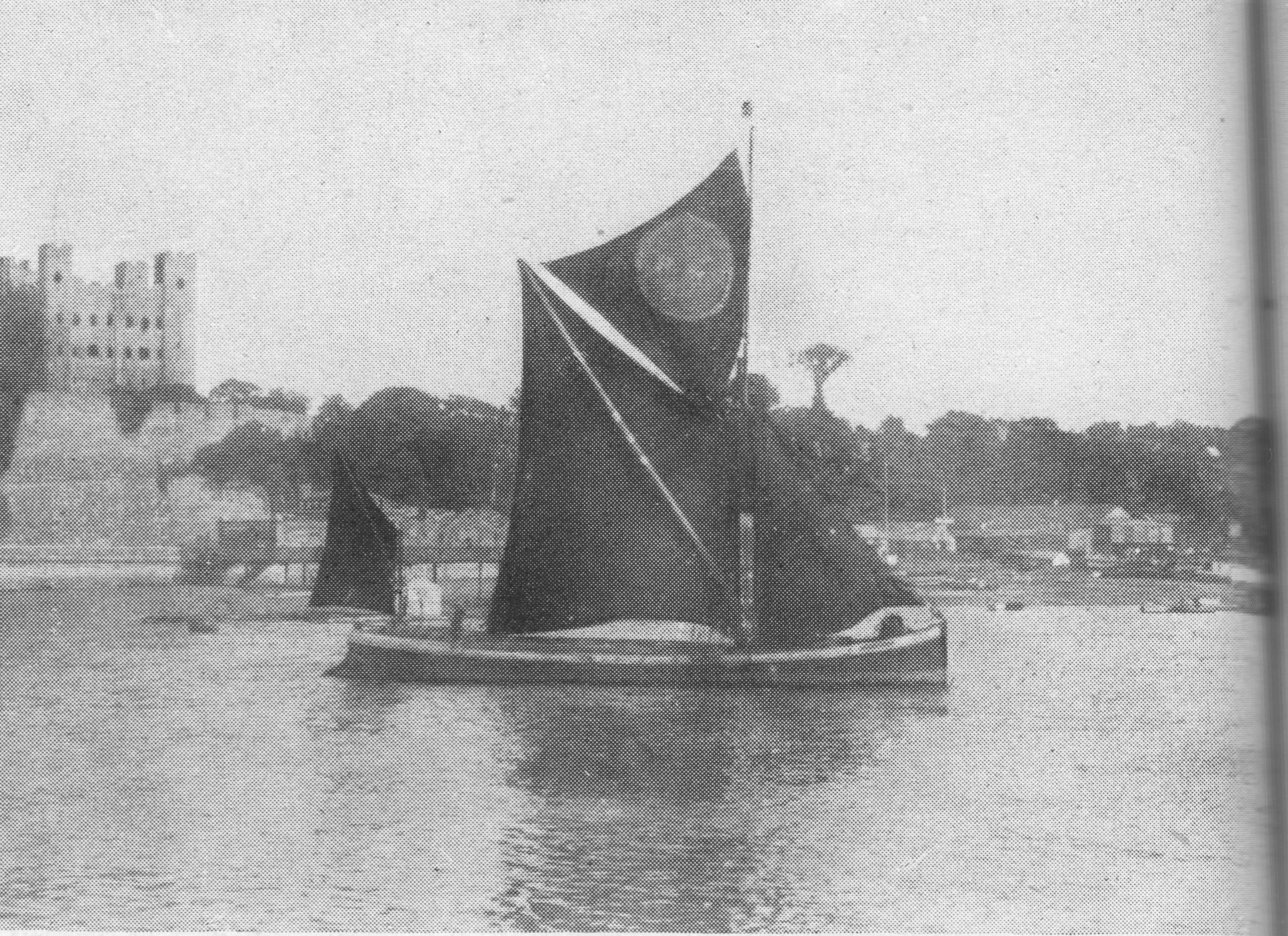
Spritsail barge Dunstable, built 1891

March's 1948 book on Thames and Medway spritsail barges constituted an inspiration for a public movement to preserve at least one of those vessels, which by 1955 were almost gone from the water. Even by 1949 the skipper of the barge Kathleen lifted his eyes from March's book and told a reporter that the end of spritsail barges was coming because boys no longer wanted to work long hours on a sailing ship, and that already the Kathleen had lost her sail and gained an engine. In 1955 the Thames Sailing Barge Trust held an exhibition in Chatham library. They wanted to preserve at least one of those barges for posterity. Although despised in the past, that type of vessel had become the "darling of the sea" by 1955, and barge-sailing clubs had formed. The Maidstone Telegraph comments that "Mr March undertook the bulk of the research during the difficult days of the war". According to March's book, the Thames barge sailing races began in 1863, and in consequence the barges' construction and the men's seamanship improved. The book also includes plans and instructions for the model maker.

=== On Sailing Drifters ===
The Hull Daily Mail describes this book as "a thing of joy for its magnificent production". In 1952, when March's Sailing Drifters was first published, The Scotsman says:

Memories [of old fishermen] enrich his book, though it is no mere romantic evocation of vanished glories. On the contrary, it is a solid work, packed with information collected with the unflagging industry of an enthusiast. [Although location and history is covered], Mr March's interest is obviously in the design of sailing drifters and in local types which he describes in the most careful and elaborate detail. He illustrates the construction and rig of the vessels by a series of scale plans extending to some 60 pages, where there are nearly 200 photographs of drifters under sail or in harbour, of fishing villages, and crowded ports.

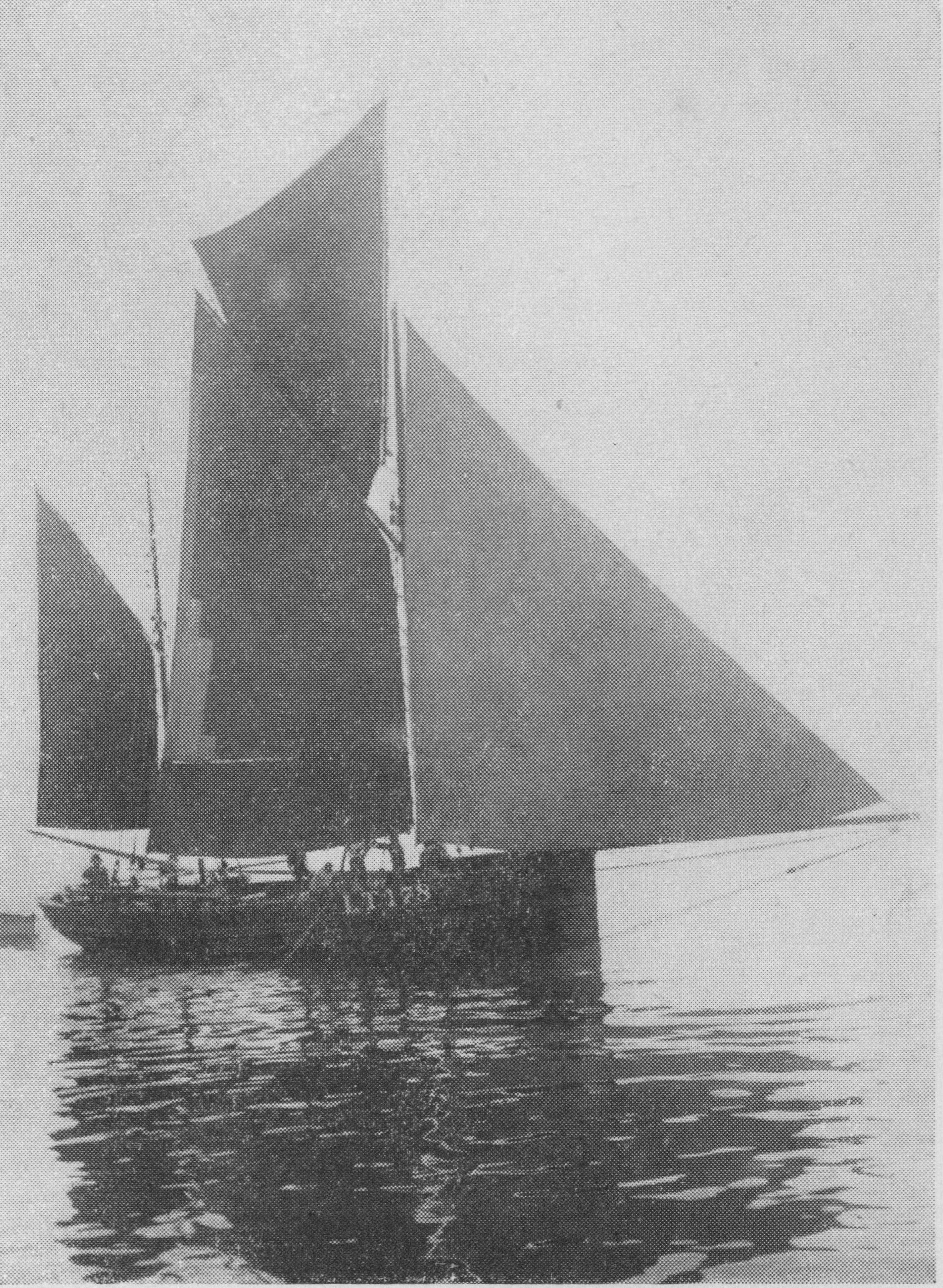
Drifter Twilight (1895) under way

The Banffshire Advertiser reviewed the book at length in 1952, saying, "It is indeed amazing what a mass of detail and illustrated information author Edgar J. March has succeeded in getting between the covers of his book, Sailing Drifters". The newspaper devoted much attention to March's content dealing with Buckie, its scaffies, and the great gale of 1848, when many lives were lost. As reported by the Berwickshire News and General Advertiser, the book also includes details of the East Coast Disaster of 1881, where, again, many fishermen lost their lives, leaving hundreds of children fatherless.

After March's Sailing Drifters was reprinted in 1971, it was still drawing attention. Reporter Stephen Guy comments on the sailors' superstitions, and says, "These are just a few of the gems packed in this revived voluminous work – the story of Britiain's herring luggers. The mass of minutiae transforms an apparently dull subject into the chronicle of a vanished way of life". Sailing Drifters was reprinted again in 1978. In 1964 Sailing Drifters was caught up in a discussion of the three-mile fishing limit, because the book contained details of a fishing charter which were not easily available anywhere else, at the time.

Reviewer D.C. of the Lynn Advertiser quotes March: "The time this book should have been written was fifty years ago when sail rode the waters as a thing of life and beauty. In the interim two fierce storms of man-made violence swept this country. The first saw the extinction of the sailing drifter; during the second priceless records vanished, some to swell salvage drives, others burned up on the funeral pyre of Nazi hate". D.C. adds that, "The 191 photographs portray a way of life now gone for ever and likely to have vanished unrecorded had not Edgar J. March striven to collect information stored in the wise old heads of a generation now well into the evening of its day".

Although the Shetland Times reviewer of 1952 bemoans the lack of specific reference to Shetland fishing boats within the Scottish fleet, he still describes Sailing Drifters as "monumental" and "magnificent". He does mention a description by the Shetlander Stuart Bruce of the colourful nature of the scaffies and fifies which were once used in Shetland, but which could not be recorded in black and white photographs. For example, "The fifies were gaily coloured – white or blue gunwales, black topsides, a red or yellow bend, white water cuts and green bottoms". March intended to include the Shetland fleet in his Inshore Craft, having begun working on the book by 1951, but did not complete it until 1970.

=== On Sailing Trawlers ===
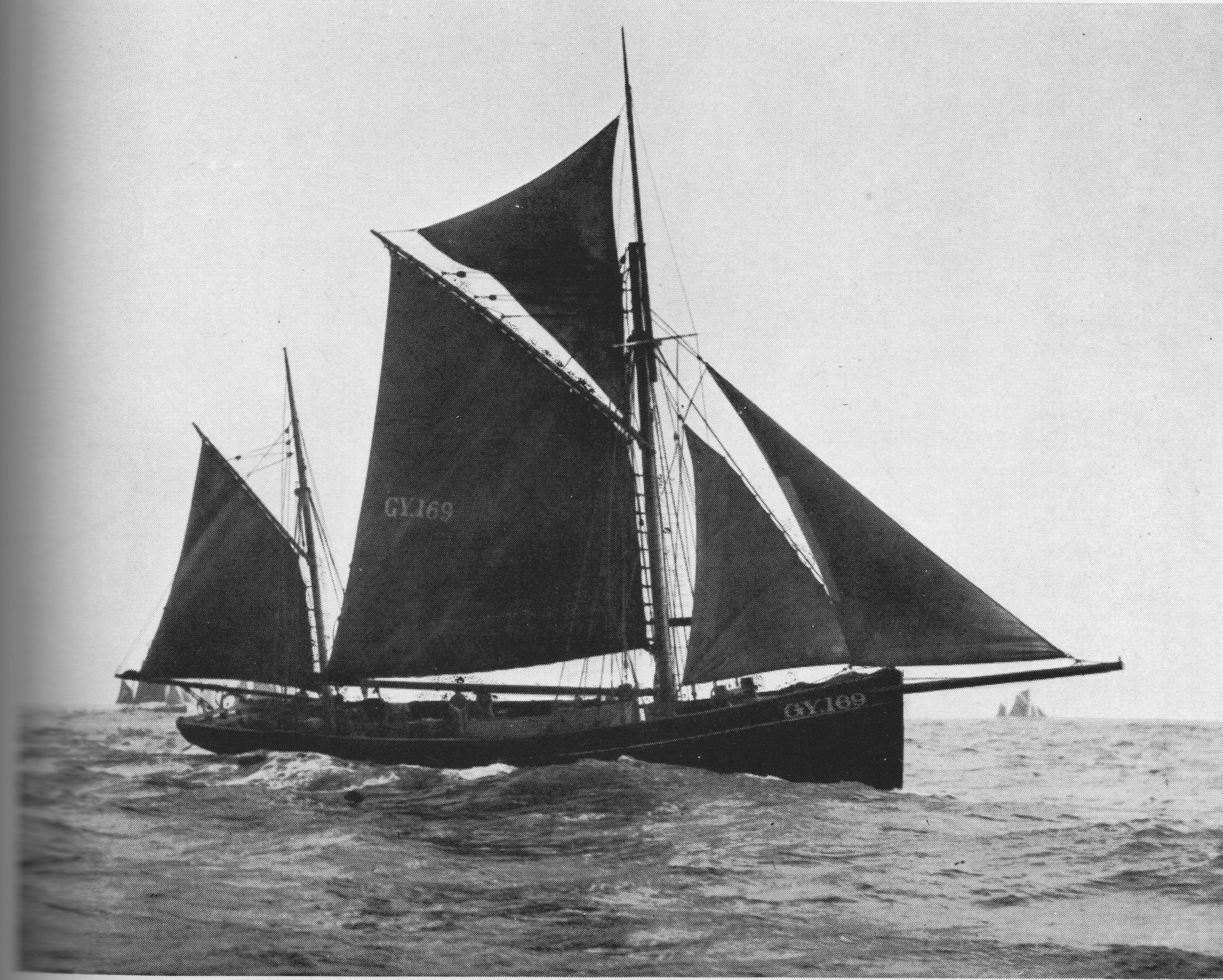
Trawler Hibernia (1877) under way

The loss of the last sailing smacks, and the last-minute salvage of memory of them, struck many of the reviewers of this book. For this volume, March interviewed smacksmen who first went to sea in the 1870s, and he included some nautical photographs which on appearance in his book were at least a century old. He wrote that the last of the sailing trawlers were used on the Norfolk Broads in the Second World War to deflect the landing of enemy seaplanes, and that he managed to examine the remaining ones in order to note their construction details.

A 1953 Shetland Times review of Sailing Trawlers calls the book "a masterpiece". Bookman of Berwickshire News says,

Years ago, vast fleets from Hull, Grimsby, Great Yarmouth, Lowestoft, Barking, Ramsgate, Brixham and Plymouth left to trawl in the North Sea and around our shores while smacks brought in live cod for the London market. Of these thousands no one remains today working under sail, but their story has been recaptured for all time in this comprehensive volume.

Edward Crossley describes Sailing Trawlers as a "magnificent volume". He notes March's comment that many of the skilled fishermen were illiterate and used inadequate compasses, but that their seamanship was superb, such that with education they could have been officers in the navy. He notes March's words: "Sad as it is to see the disappearance of the picturesque sailing smacks ... still sadder is it to realise that the splendid men who manned them are going fast". March quotes a trawlerman who said, "In the old days there was always laughter when the men were working. You don't hear it nowadays".

James R. Nicolson calls March's Sailing Trawlers a "great book", and repeats some of its information on the first steam-trawling fishery of 1877 and its subsequent expansion, in his article on overfishing. Reviewer J.C.W. of the Grimsby Daily Telegraph describes the book as:

A superb book [and] a classic, a harvest of sea lore and history unobtainable in any other form. The smack fleets have all gone ... Mr March has saved them from oblivion by presenting their story – their history, the life of a fisherman, his working methods, vessels' rigs and methods of construction ... this is such a well-documented, deeply-researched book".

=== On Inshore Craft of Britain in the Days of Sail and Oar ===
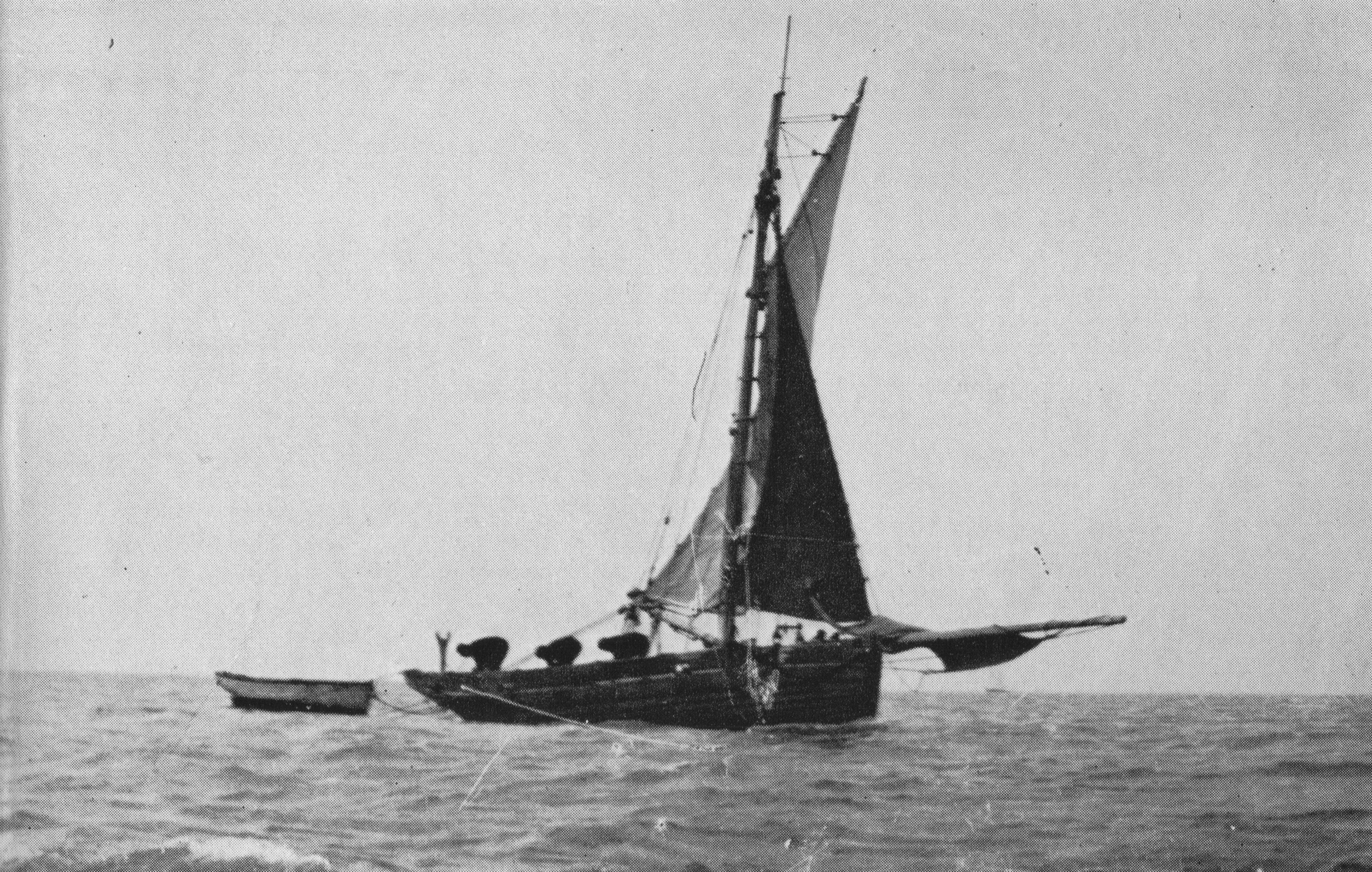
An early oyster dredger, with men hauling dredges

March's Inshore Craft of Britain in the Days of Sail and Oar was published in 1970. Alan Wrangles says:

"I find it very difficult to express my feelings, ranging as they do from admiration of the author and his work to a sense of gratitude that all of this fascinating information has been brought together and will now live on for ever ... The two volumes are in fact wonderful storehouses, not only of historical fact but of technical know-how. If Mr March had not written these books much of which they contain would undoubtedly have been lost for ever. [They are] two reference books of inestimable value".

Of the same publication, Michael and Mollie Hardwick say,

"Without doubt, this ... is destined to live as a principal source book for nautical and general historians, at both national and local level, and for model makers and armchair enthusiasts. Mr March has condensed a lifetime's study into this work. A great many of his sources are unique in that they were old men since dead – fishermen, boatmen, boat builders, even smugglers – who could speak from first hand experience of the kind of craft in common use a century and more ago. What we like so much about his work is that when, in the course of setting down hard and technical fact an anecdote springs to mind, he doesn't hesitate to pass it on, so that his books are as much yarns as treatises.

== Legacy ==
An uncatalogued collection of notes, books, papers and photographs pertaining to March's research for his lectures and publications is held at the National Maritime Museum. It comprises 15 boxes and one oversized folder, and the contents are dated between 1860 and 1945. The collections is titled, "Uncatalogued: March, Edgar J, Maritime Author, Fl. 1952-1970". Although photographs are mentioned, the list does not mention the films and the 15,000 magic lantern slides as used by March in his lectures; the whereabouts of these is unknown.
