= Well smack =

Traditional fishing boat in the United Kingdom

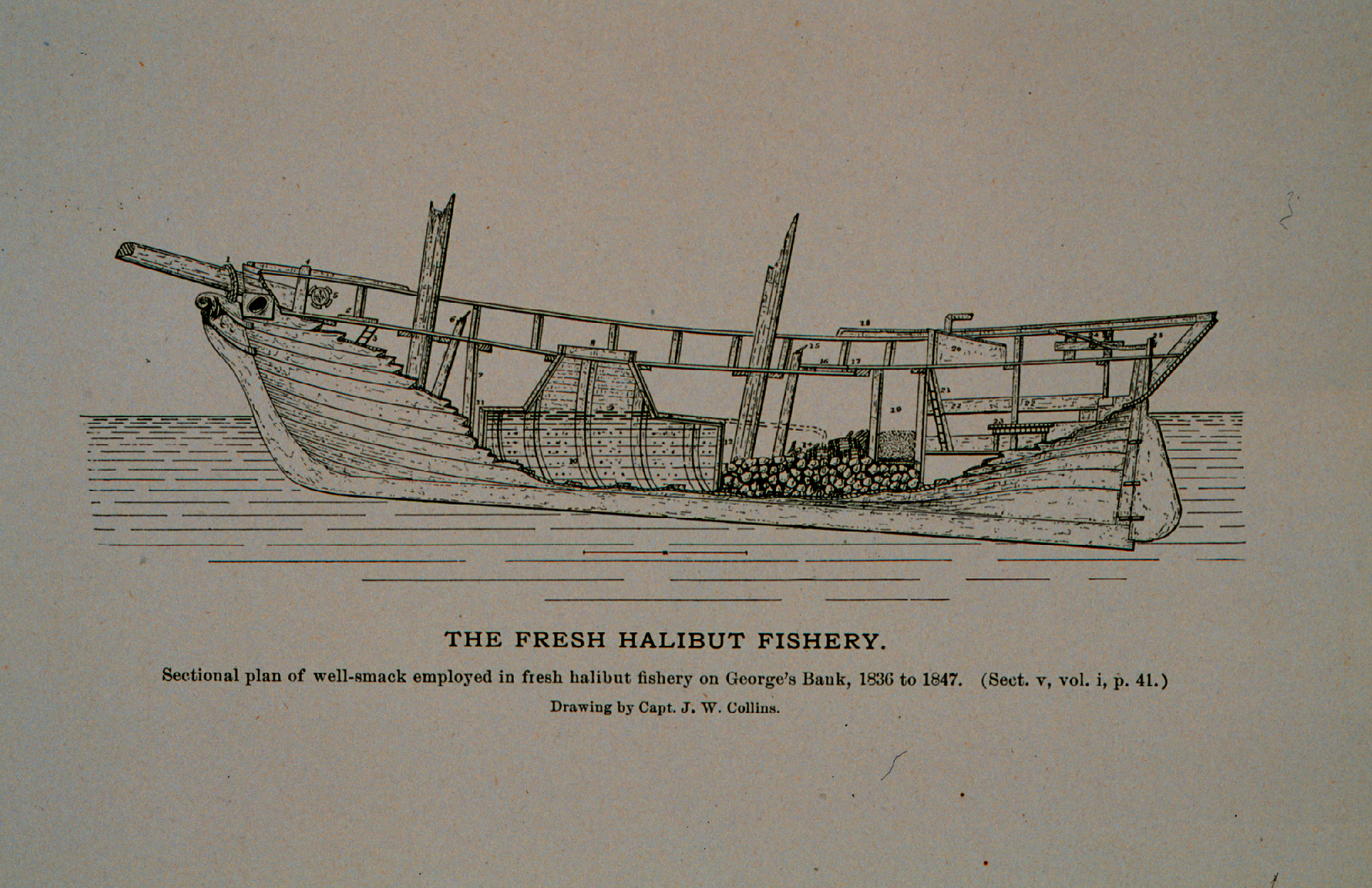
Sectional drawing of well smack

A well smack was a type of traditional fishing boat in use in the United Kingdom and then the Faroe Islands between the late 18th century and around 1920. It had a well amidships. The well was filled with circulated external water, which kept fish alive until delivered to land and sold. It was a modified form of a fishing smack.

== History ==
Between roughly 1775 and 1875, "well smack" referred to a 50-foot gaff cutter used in long-lining for cod, ling, turbot, and other bottom-living sea fish. These vessels were also known as cod boats. From roughly 1875 to 1920, they were extended to make 80-foot gaff ketches, sometimes by the cut-and-shut procedure. Some were built as new 80-foot welled smacks; some were turned into dry ships for use with ice.

== Structure and usage ==
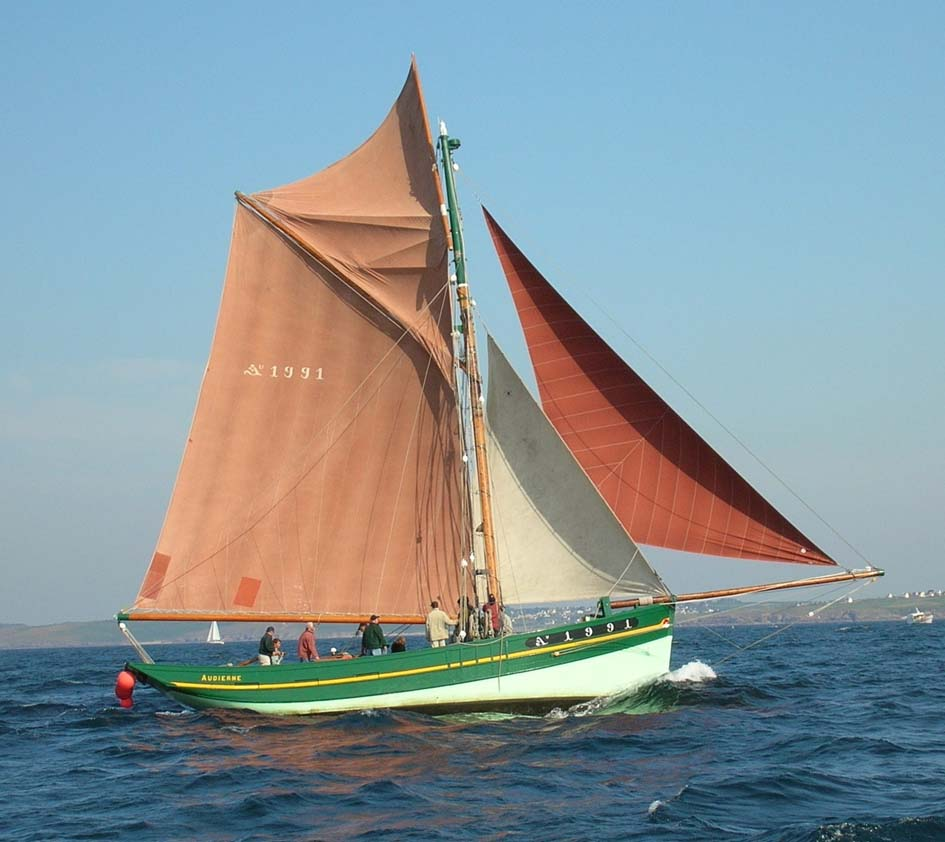
Gaff cutter rig

These smacks were heavy-hulled with a draught of two fathoms. They were buoyant fore and aft, with the well contained amidships. Auger holes were drilled in the sides of the hull so that water could flow freely for re-oxygenation. Fish placed in the well could then be carried upriver to market (from 1750 especially Billingsgate, London; from 1900 the Faroes) in fresh condition. The swim bladders of the fish had to be pierced to prevent them from floating. Turbot and other flatfish were suspended on thin rope to prevent them from clogging the augur holes. Crews considered these ships safe and stable, according to Faroes crewmen who remembered sailing in them before 1920.

By about 1854, the Thames was too polluted for use of welled smacks, and fishermen had to leave fish in floating cod boxes in the Thames estuary near Ipswich. Many fishermen moved out of Thames fishing ports such as Barking, and went to the east coast, especially to Grimsby and Lowestoft. Some cod boats, including some welled smacks, did continue to fish out of Barking until around 1900. However most continued to carry the Port of London port-registration LO.

Until the 1870s, these smacks travelled from London to Iceland in summer, and returned via North Sea ports, including Holland. From the 1870s, those converted to dry ketches were used in fleeting in the North Sea, especially in the Silver Pits. From 1900 to 1920, the last welled smacks were sold to the Faroe Islands. The last welled smacks sank in the Faroes in about 1920.

== Marine archaeology and research ==
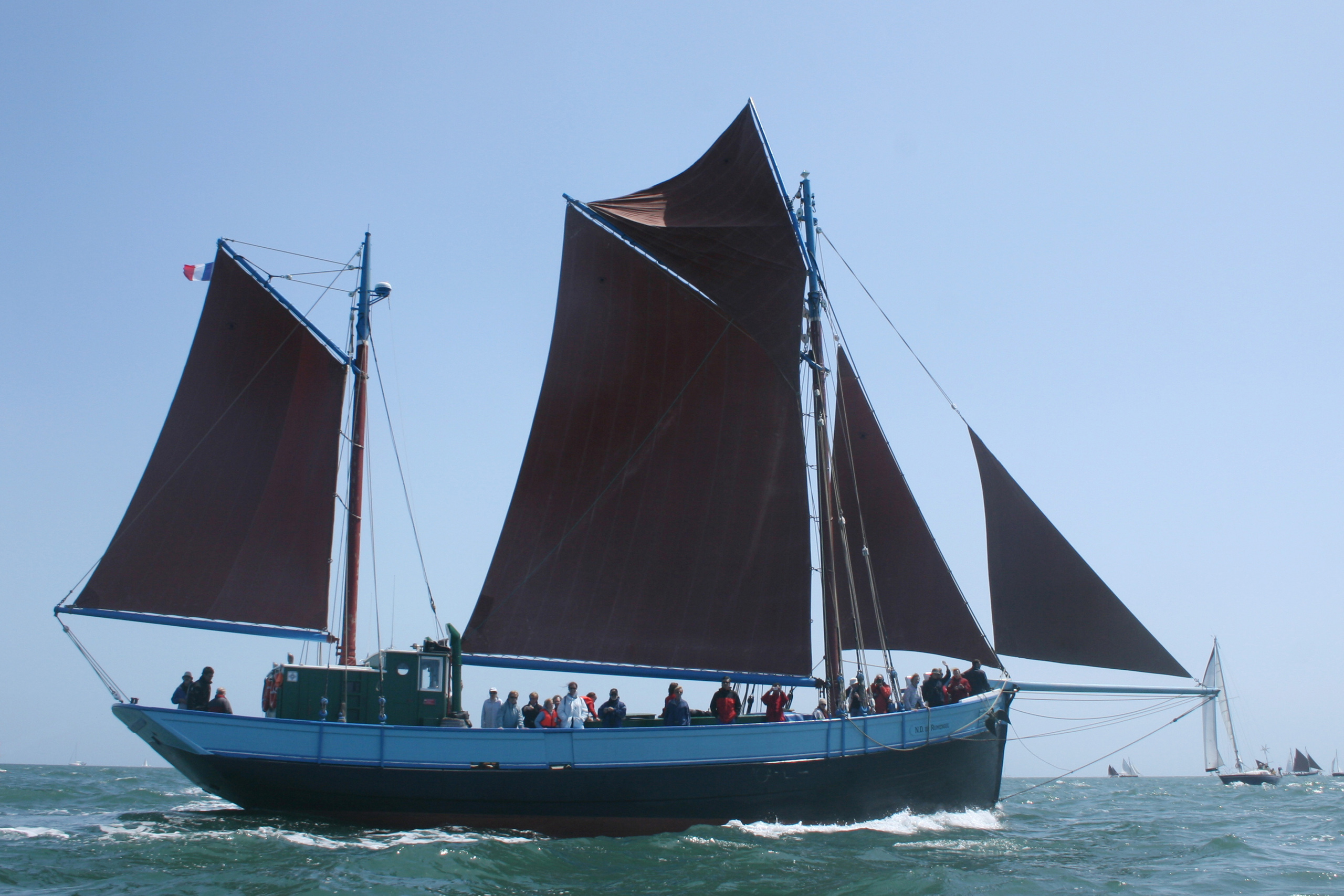
Gaff ketch rig

There is no way today of seeing or touching a UK welled smack, apart from the drawings, and a fuzzy, distant photo or two, in Edgar J. March's 1950 book. There is no known film, photo of the deck, marine wreck site, or souvenir. A welled smack should be easily identifiable at a wreck site from the unusually heavy hull-construction around the well. In the British Film Institute there may be one copy of a Faroese film of sou-westered fishermen on the rolling deck of a welled smack, pricking swim-bladders and placing the fish in the well—but it is not available to researchers for confirmation. In New England, however, the Emma C. Berry survives.

== See also ==
- Well-boat
- Corf
- On the coast of Pomerania (Germany, Poland) a similar vessel was known as Quatze (German Wikipedia)

== Bibliography ==
- Dempster, Henry. The Fisheries and Fishmarkets of Great Britain, Edinburgh (1874)
- March, Edgar J. Sailing Trawlers (1950)
- March, Edgar J. Sailing Trawlers: The Story of Deep-Sea Fishing With Long Line and Trawl, (David & Charles, 1970) ISBN 978-0-87742-004-0

== Image links ==
- Grimsby well smack model
- Barking and Dagenham coat of arms featuring well smack
- Emma C. Berry (1866), New England well smack
- Saucy Jack, Barking well smack as measured, drawn and described by Edgar J. March in Sailing Trawlers (1950)
- Model of well smack Glide
