= Bjarne Mørk Eidem =

Norwegian politician (1936–2022)

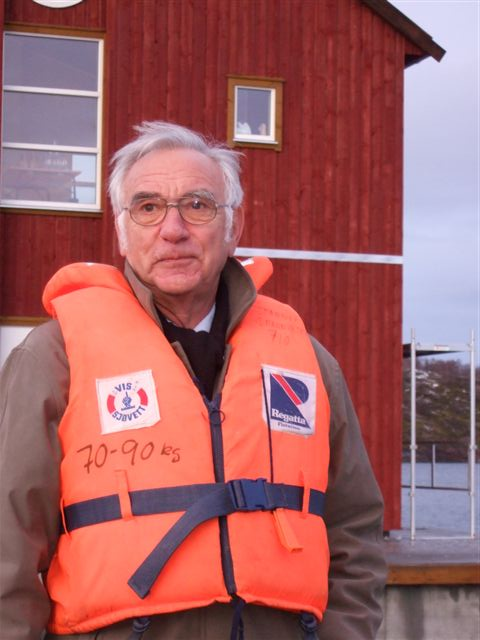
- Eidem in 2008

Auditor General of Norway
- In office 1 July 1990 – 1 October 2005
- Prime Minister: Gro Harlem Brundtland; Thorbjørn Jagland; Kjell Magne Bondevik; Jens Stoltenberg
- Preceded by: Petter Furuberg
- Succeeded by: Jørgen Kosmo

Vice President of the Storting
- In office 10 October 1989 – 1 July 1990 Serving with Kirsti Kolle Grøndahl
- President: Jo Benkow

Minister of Fisheries
- In office 9 May 1986 – 10 October 1989
- Prime Minister: Gro Harlem Brundtland
- Preceded by: Eivind Reiten
- Succeeded by: Svein Munkejord

Minister of Nordic Cooperation
- In office 9 May 1986 – 10 October 1989
- Prime Minister: Gro Harlem Brundtland
- Preceded by: Asbjørn Haugstvedt
- Succeeded by: Tom Vraalsen

Member of the Norwegian Parliament
- In office 1 October 1969 – 30 September 1993
- Constituency: Nordland

Personal details
- Born: 4 October 1936 Vega, Nordland, Norway
- Died: 2 October 2022 (aged 85)
- Party: Labour
- Children: Alexander Mørk-Eidem

Bjarne Mørk Eidem (4 October 1936 – 2 October 2022) was a Norwegian politician for the Labour Party. He was chairman of the Norwegian Aquaculture Center in Brønnøy Municipality.

== Biography ==
Bjarne Mørk Eidem was a member of the Norwegian Parliament from 1969 to 1993, representing Nordland. He was made Minister of Fisheries in the second cabinet of Gro Harlem Brundtland from 1986 to 1989, as well as minister of Nordic cooperation. Mørk Eidem resigned on 10 October, six days before the cabinet. From 1990 to 2005, he was Auditor General of Norway.

Political offices
Preceded by Petter Furberg	Auditor General of Norway; 1990–2005	Succeeded by Jørgen Kosmo
Cultural offices
Preceded by Reidar Østgård	Chairman of Foreningen Norden in Norway; 1991–1999	Succeeded by Grete Øverlier
