= Peter Hersleb Graah Birkeland =

The Right Reverend Peter Hersleb Graah Birkeland
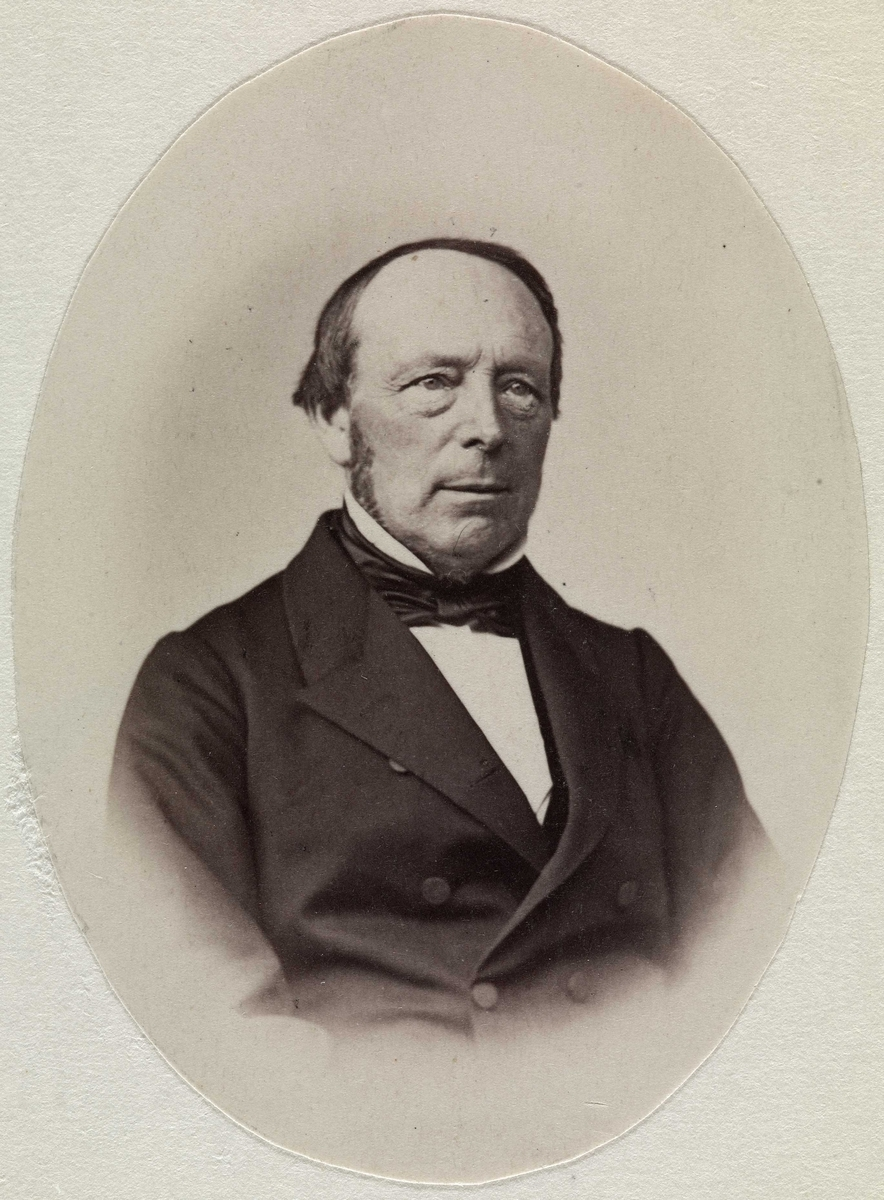

Personal details
- Born: 14 January 1807 Borgund Municipality, Norway
- Died: 5 January 1896 (aged 88) Kristiania, Norway
- Denomination: Christian
- Occupation: Priest

Peter Hersleb Graah Birkeland (14 January 1807 – 5 January 1896) was a Norwegian priest in the Church of Norway. He served as Bishop of the Diocese of Bjørgvin from 1864–1880.

== Early life and family ==
Peter Birkeland was born in Borgund Municipality in Møre og Romsdal county, Norway. He was the son of Lars Birkeland and Johanne Hellem Baade. He came from a family of ministers. His father was the chaplain at Borgund Church at the time of his birth and his maternal grandfather had also been a priest. In 1821 he went to Bergen Cathedral School and he graduated with a Cand.theol. degree in 1832.

In 1836 he married Severine Elise Angell Gram in the Nidaros Cathedral. The couple had nine children, although some died in their youth. Their son Lauritz married Elen Lovise Augusta Kildal, a daughter of Peter Wessel Wind Kildal, niece of Peter Daniel Baade Wind Kildal, and sister of Birger Kildal.

== Career ==
Peter Birkeland started his professional career as a priest in the Church of Norway in 1833. His first job was in 1833 when he was named the parish priest for Fosnes Church in Fosnes Municipality. In 1837, he was called to be the Dean of the Namdal deanery in Nord-Trøndelag county, a post he served until 1841. His next job was in Bergen where he served as the priest for the Tugthuset og Slaveriet (prison) parish in Bergen from 1841–1848. In 1848, Birkeland was named as the first pastor to the Hetland Church parish. It was in this post where he became acquainted with Haugean movement. In 1842 he was one of the co-founders of the Norwegian Missionary Society in Stavanger.

He served in Hetland Municipality from 1848 until 1864 when he was appointed Bishop of the Diocese of Bjørgvin, based in Bergen. During his time as bishop, he consecrated 81 new churches in the diocese.

He retired from the ministry in 1880, having served 16 years as Bishop. He died on 5 January 1896 in Kristiania.

Church of Norway titles
Preceded by Jens Mathias Pram Kaurin	Bishop of Bjørgvin; 1864–1880	Succeeded by Fredrik Waldemar Hvoslef
