= Hans T. H. Lütken =

Norwegian jurist

Hans Trygve Helmer Lütken
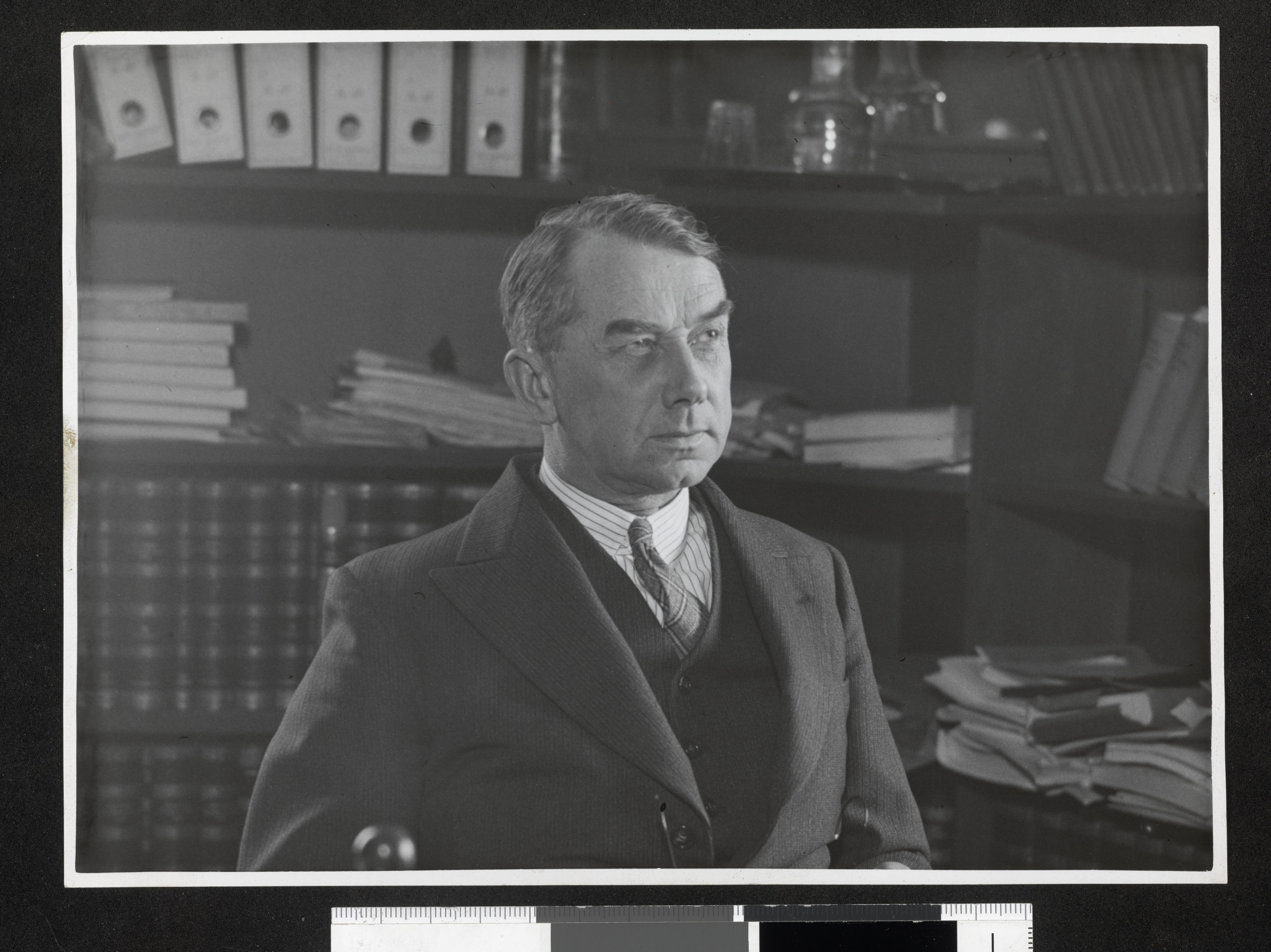
- Born: 6 April 1882; Christiania, Norway
- Died: 5 March 1949 (aged 66)
- Occupation: Auditor General of Norway

Hans Trygve Helmer Lütken (6 April 1882 – 5 March 1949) was a Norwegian jurist and state auditor.

He was born in Christiania to Harald Lütken and Martha Larsen, and graduated as cand.jur. in 1906. He served as Auditor General from 1926 to 1949.

Political offices
Preceded by Tore E. Aaen	Auditor General of Norway; 1926–1949	Succeeded by Saamund Olsen Bergland
