= Saamund Olsen Bergland =

Norwegian politician (1881–1978)

- Born: 24 May 1881; Fyresdal Municipality, Norway
- Died: 23 June 1978 (aged 97); Notodden Municipality, Norway
- Occupations: State auditor Politician
- Known for: Auditor General 1949–1950

Saamund Olsen Bergland (24 May 1881 – 23 June 1978) was a Norwegian state auditor and politician.

He was born in Fyresdal Municipality to Ole Torkelsen Vatnedal and Anne Saamundsdatter Nedrebø. He was elected representative to the Storting for the period 1931–1933, for the Labour Party. He served as Auditor General from 1949–1950.

Political offices
Preceded by Hans T. H. Lütken	Auditor General of Norway; 1949–1950	Succeeded by Lars Breie
