= Karl Kildal =

Norwegian equestrian

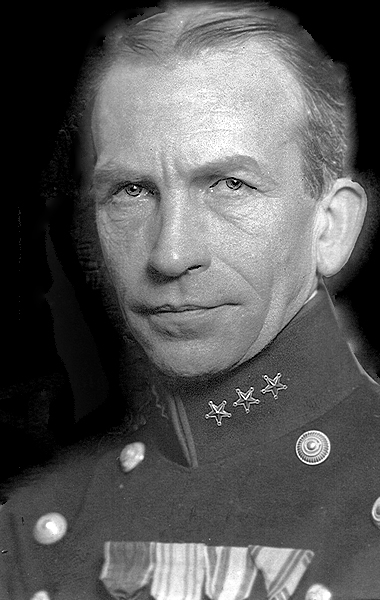
- Karl Kildal, c. 1938

Personal information
- Nationality: Norwegian
- Born: 1 February 1881; Oslo, Norway
- Died: 14 November 1932 (aged 51)

Sport
- Sport: Equestrian

Karl Kildal (1 February 1881 – 14 November 1932) was a Norwegian equestrian. He was born in Oslo. He competed at the 1912 Summer Olympics in Stockholm, where he placed 24th in show jumping.
