= Norwegian Aquaculture Center =

Fish farming center in Norway

Coordinates: 65°28′11″N 012°08′02″E

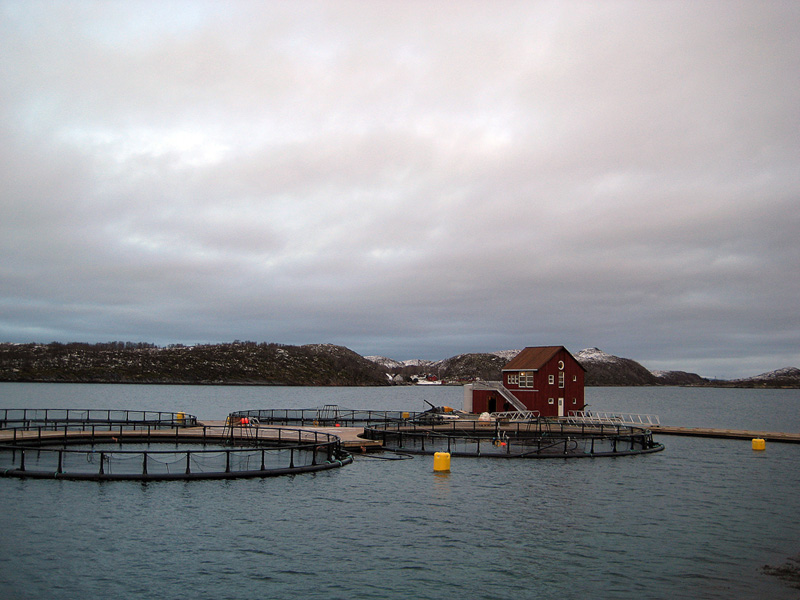
Fish farm and floating building at Norwegian Aquaculture Center

The Norwegian Aquaculture Center (Norwegian: Norsk Havbrukssenter) is a visitor and development center for modern fish farming in Norway. The center is located to Toft in Brønnøy Municipality and cooperate with several companies in fish farming and related businesses.

The center started operating in 2008 and administers a demonstration fish farm with access from land. The site includes a modern feeding platform, automated feeding system, control room, under water cameras, salmon cages, cod cages and a little aquarium.

The center is open to the public, visitors are kindergartens, schools, tourists, local people and people in the fish farming industry. There is several scientific projects ongoing at the center. Among them is the project Northern Cod, through Norwegian Center of Expertise Aquaculture and testing of a closed cage in cooperation with Teknologisk institutt and Plastsveis AS.

Chairman of the company was until 2022 Bjarne Mørk-Eidem, an earlier member of parliament and Norwegian Minister of Fishery.
