= Peter Wessel Wind Kildal =

Norwegian merchant and industrialist

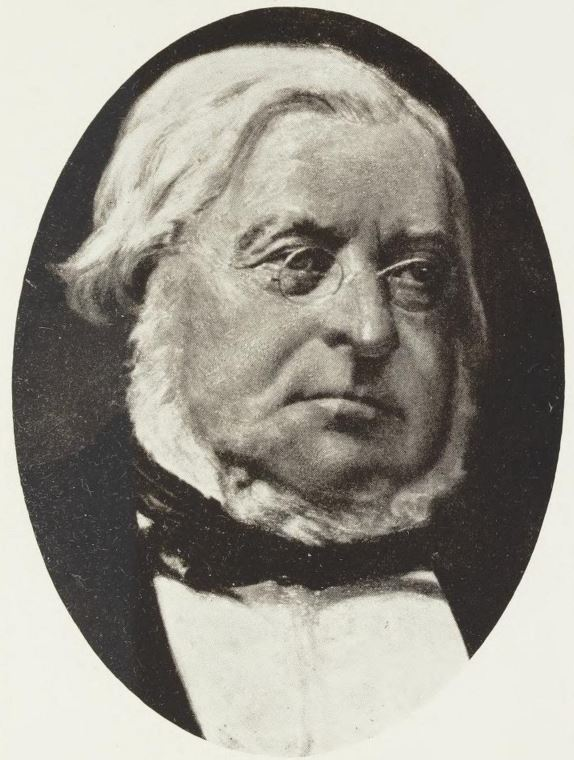
Peter Wessel Wind Kildal

Peter Wessel Wind Kildal (24 November 1814 – 22 March 1882) was a Norwegian merchant and industrialist.

Kildal was born at Borgund in Romsdalen county, Norway. He was the son of Ole Severin Kildal and Karen Friis Wind. He was the brother of politician, Peter Daniel Baade Wind Kildal.

As a young man, Kildal went to Christiania (now Oslo) to apprentice with Christian Benneche who ran a general store. He opened his first mercantile store in Christiania in 1842. He gradually expanded other businesses into P. W. W. Kildal & Co. At Høyenhall in Østensjø, he owned the country's largest fruit plantation, at Hol in Ringsaker Municipality where he owned a farm, a dairy, and a potato flour factory. In 1863 he took over the Lilleborg Fabriker factory which remained family operated until 1897.

He was married to Christine Marie Gotaas (1817-1900) and was the father of Birger Kildal. His daughter Elen Lovise married Lauritz Birkeland, a son of bishop Peter Hersleb Graah Birkeland.
