= Peter Daniel B. W. Kildal =

Norwegian politician

Peter Daniel Baade Wind Kildal (4 October 1816 – 16 March 1881) was a Norwegian politician.

He was elected to the Norwegian Parliament in 1857, 1862, 1865, 1868 and 1871. He represented the constituency of Christiania, Hønefoss og Kongsvinger. During the last term he was President of the Storting, together with later Prime Minister Johan Sverdrup. As Sverdrup, Kildal was a strong antagonist of the sitting government.

Having graduated as cand.jur. in 1839, he worked as a Supreme Court lawyer, and was the Auditor General of Norway from 1854 to 1881.

Hailing from Borgund, he was the brother of Peter Wessel Wind Kildal, industrialist and father of Birger Kildal.

Political offices
| Preceded by Johan D. Rye | Auditor General of Norway; 1854–1881 | Succeeded by Peder K. Gaarder |
| Preceded by Hans Jørgen C. Aall; Georg Prahl Harbitz; Carl Valentin Falsen | President of the Storting; 1871–1873 | Succeeded by Bernhard L. Essendrop; Johan Sverdrup |
