= Nese =

Nese may refer to:

- Nese, Italy, a village in northern Italy
- Nese, Norway, a village in south-western Norway
- Nese language, an Oceanic language or dialect spoken in Vanuatu
- Tony Nese, American professional wrestler

== See also ==
- Neşe, a Turkish female given name
