= Holskardvatnet =

Lake in Vik, Norway

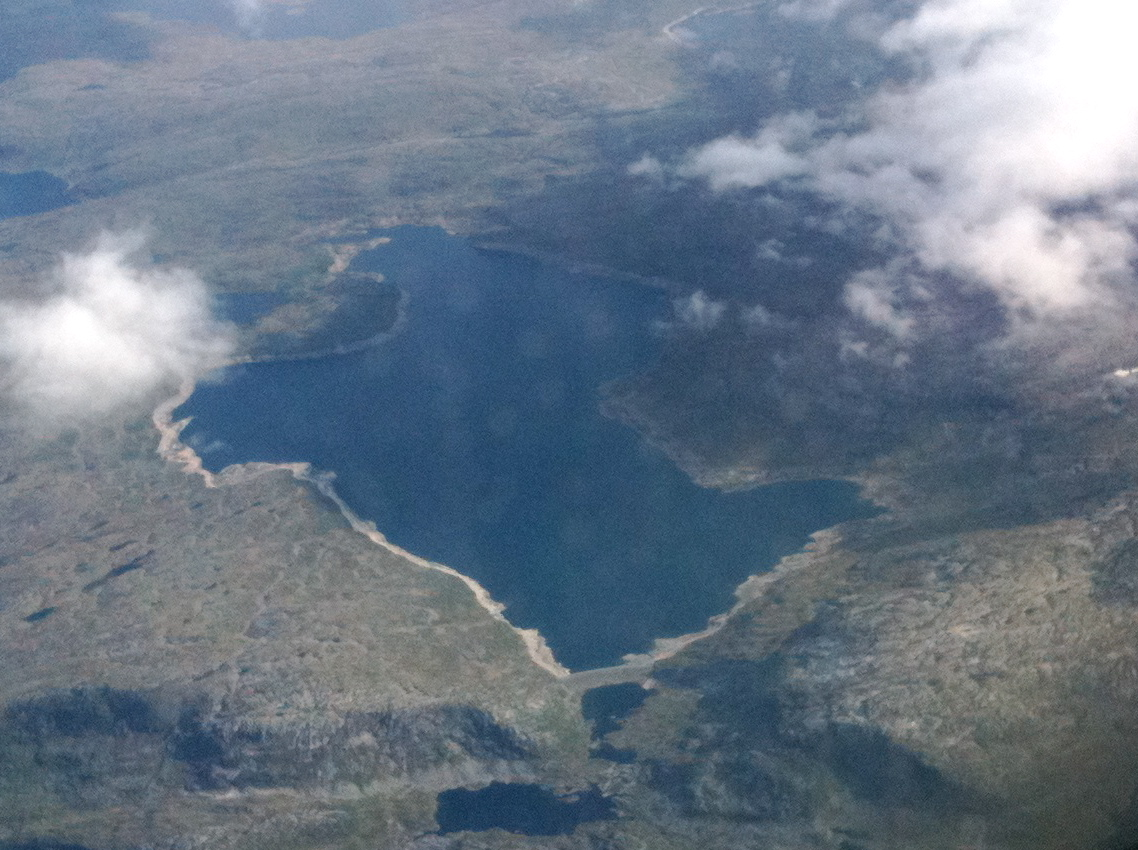
- Interactive map of Holskardvatnet
- Location: Vik, Vestland
- Coordinates: 60°56′5″N 6°10′20″E
- Basin countries: Norway
- Max. length: 3.5 kilometres (2.2 mi)
- Max. width: 2.2 kilometres (1.4 mi)
- Surface area: 4.81 km^{2} (1.86 sq mi)
- Shore length^{1}: 12.19 kilometres (7.57 mi)
- Surface elevation: 845 metres (2,772 ft)
- References: NVE
- ^{1} Shore length is not a well-defined measure.

Holskardvatnet is a lake in Vik Municipality in Vestland county, Norway. It is located just less than 100 metres (330 ft) north of the border with Modalen Municipality. The lake is 20 kilometres (12 mi) south of the village of Ortnevik in neighboring Høyanger Municipality, about 13 kilometres (8.1 mi) southwest of the village of Arnafjord, and about 28 kilometres (17 mi) southwest of the municipal center of Vikøyri. The 4.81 square kilometres (1.86 sq mi) lake is located at an elevation of 845 metres (2,772 ft) above sea level. There is a dam at the northwest end of the lake.

== See also ==
- List of lakes in Norway
