= Mensen Ernst =

Norwegian distance runner (1795–1843)

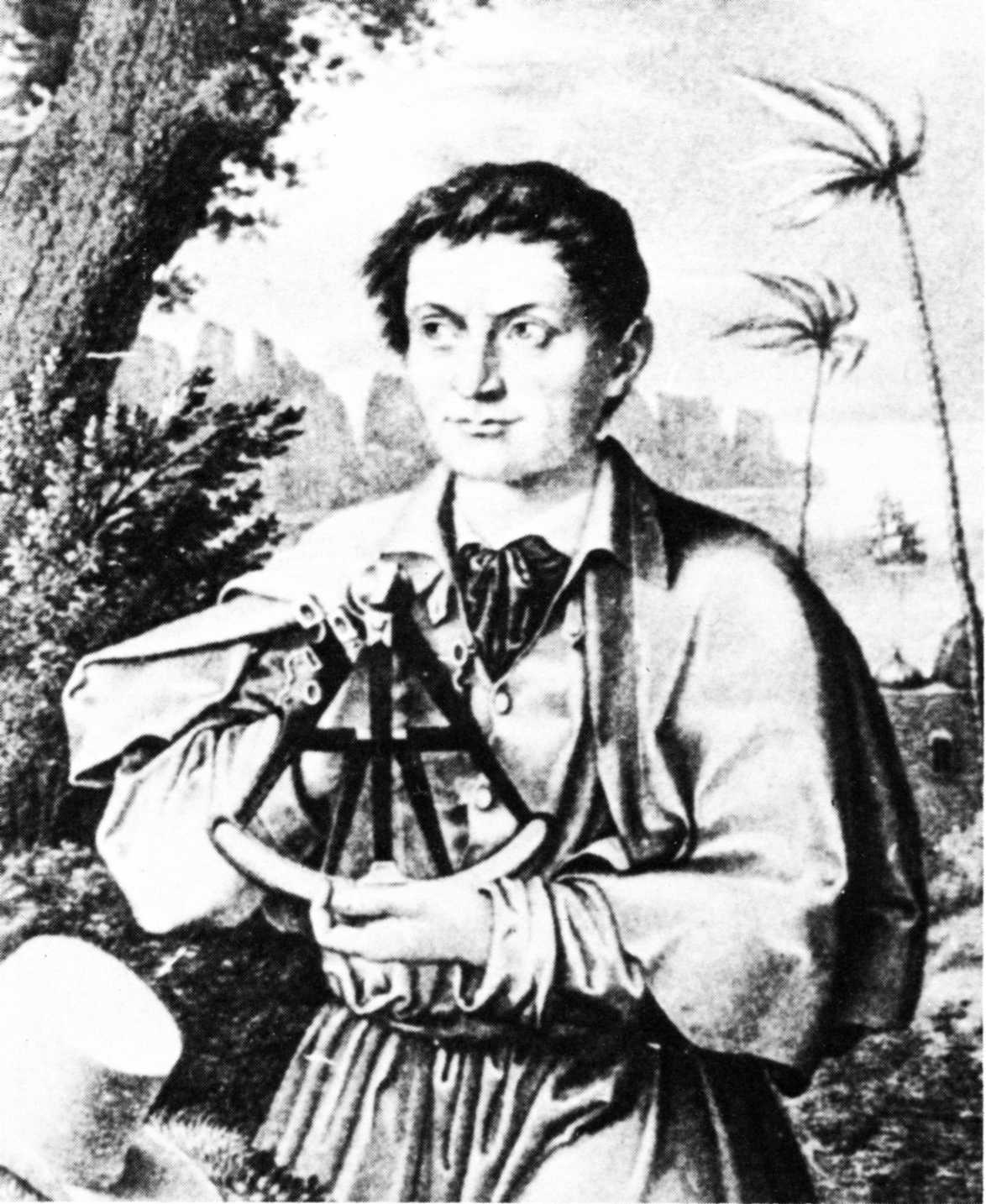
Mensen Ernst.

Mensen Ernst (1795 – 22 January 1843) was born as Mons Monsen Øyri, in the summer of 1795 in the village of Fresvik along the Sognefjord, in the municipality of Vik in Sogn og Fjordane county, Norway. He was a road runner and ultramarathonist and one of the first sport professionals and employed as a courier. He made his living running, mainly through placing bets on himself being able to run a certain distance within a period of time.

== Trips ==
He was reputed to have run about 2,500 kilometres (1,600 mi) from Paris to Moscow. It took him just under 14 days starting on 11 June 1832—averaging over 200 kilometres (120 mi) a day. On a later trip, from Istanbul to Calcutta and back again, lasting 59 days, he ran 140 kilometres (87 mi) per day. On his trips he took very little rest and never slept on a bed. When he did rest it was short naps, between ten and fifteen minutes at a time, and he took them standing or leaning against a tree with a handkerchief over his face. His last trip started in Bad Muskau, and went through Jerusalem and Cairo, from where he intended to run along the Nile until he found its source. He died in January 1843 from dysentery, close to the border between Egypt and Sudan, where he was buried a few days later. The place of his death is now buried by the Aswan Dam.
