= Vikøyri =

Village in Vik Municipality, Norway

Vikøyri Viksøyri
- Village
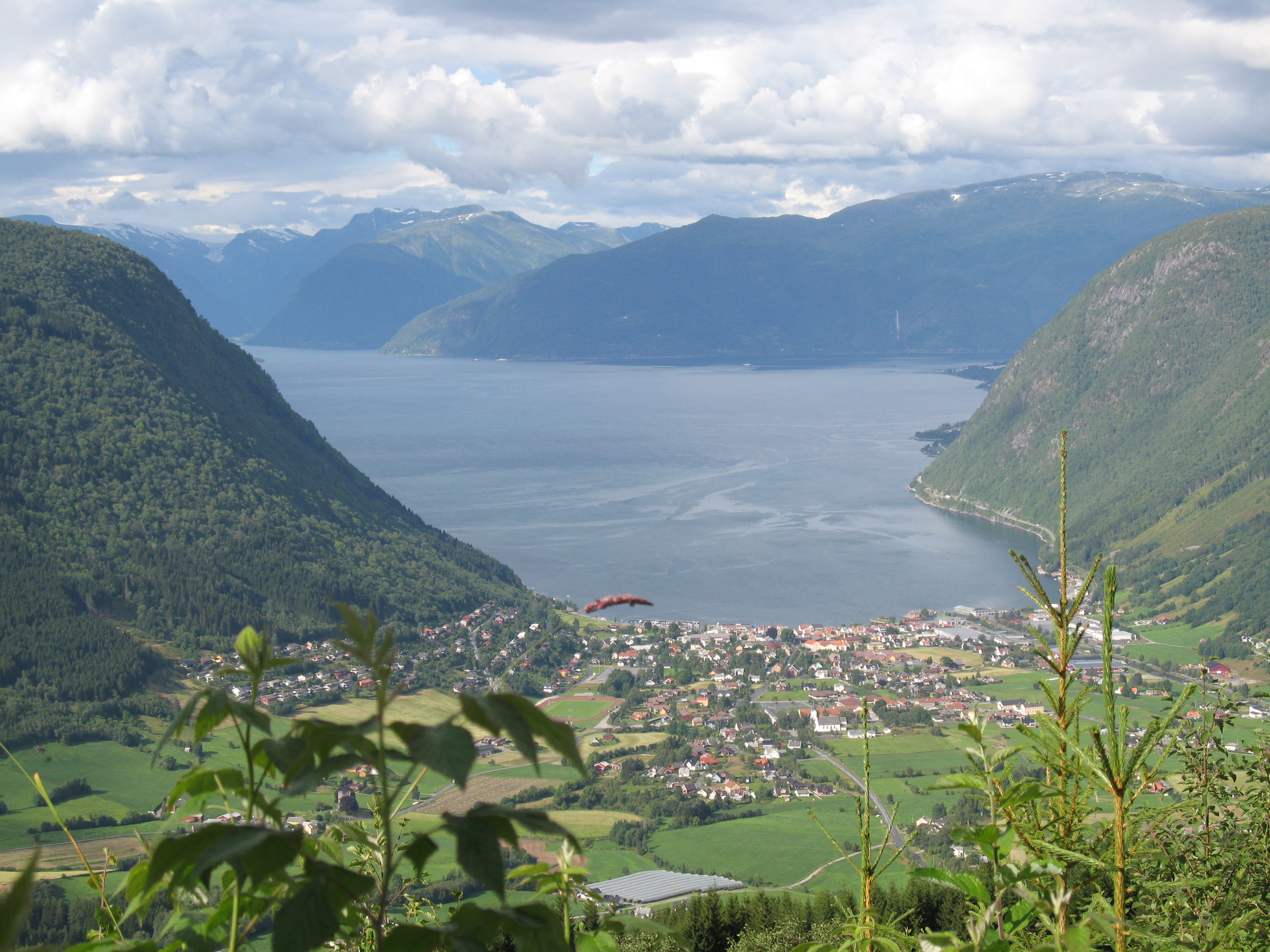
- View of Vikøyri
- Interactive map of Vikøyri
- Location within Vestland Location within Norway
- Coordinates: 61.08708°N 6.57914°E
- Country: Norway
- Region: Western Norway
- County: Vestland
- District: Sogn
- Municipality: Vik Municipality

Area
  - Total: 1.34 km^{2} (0.52 sq mi)
- Elevation: 5 m (16 ft)

Population (2025)
  - Total: 1,230
  - Density: 918/km^{2} (2,380/sq mi)
- Time zone: UTC+01:00 (CET)
  - Summer (DST): UTC+02:00 (CEST)
- Post Code: 6893 Vik i Sogn

Vikøyri is the administrative center of Vik Municipality in Vestland county, Norway. The village is located at the mouth of the Vikja river on the south shore of the Sognefjorden, roughly near the midpoint of Norway's longest fjord. The village lies along Norwegian National Road 13 which leads north to the ferry to Balestrand and south to the village of Vossevangen. The 1.34-square-kilometre (330-acre) village has a population (2025) of 1,230 and a population density of 918 inhabitants per square kilometre (2,380/sq mi).

Vikøyri sits about 13 kilometres (8.1 mi) south of the village of Balestrand (across the fjord), about 25 kilometres (16 mi) northeast of the village of Arnafjord. To the north and west of Vikøyri lie the villages of Vangsnes, Feios, and Fresvik. Vikøyri is 10 kilometres (6.2 mi) northwest of the Fresvikbreen glacier and about 26 kilometres (16 mi) northeast of the big lake Holskardvatnet.

Vikøyri is the site of one of the Tine cheese factories. It is the only factory in the world that produces gammelost, a unique Norwegian cheese. The village also has the only prison in Sogn og Fjordane. There are also two medieval churches on the south side of the village: Hove Church (built c. 1170) and the Hopperstad Stave Church (built c. 1140). Vik Church is also located in the village, although it is much newer (built in 1877) and it is the main church for the municipality.
