= Fresvikbreen =

Norwegian glacier

- Interactive map of Fresvikbreen
- Location: Vestland, Norway
- Coordinates: 61°02′03″N 06°46′14″E
- Area: 15 km^{2} (5.8 sq mi)
- Highest elevation: 1,648 metres (5,407 ft)

Fresvikbreen is a glacier on the south side of the Sognefjord in Vik Municipality in Vestland, county, Norway. It lies between the Seljedal valley in the west, and the Storedal valley in the east. It is located about 9 kilometres (5.6 mi) southwest of the village of Fresvik and 11 kilometres (6.8 mi) southeast of the municipal center of Vikøyri.

The glacier has an area of 15 square kilometres (5.8 sq mi) and its highest point is 1,648 metres (5,407 ft) above sea level. Fresvikbreen is the 23rd largest glacier on the Norwegian mainland.

== See also ==
- List of glaciers in Norway
