= Tordis Halvorsen =

Norwegian actress (1884–1955)

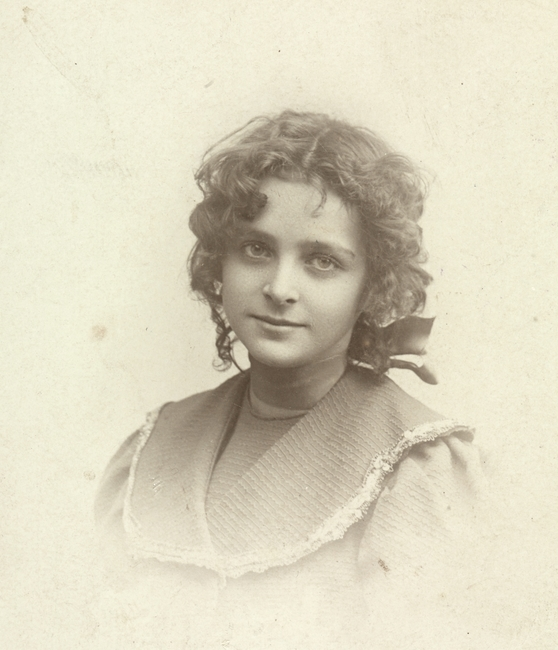
- Tordis Halvorsen in 1899
- Born: 4 January 1884; Bergen, Norway
- Died: 19 July 1955 (aged 71)
- Spouses: Christian Mohr (m. 1908, died); Francis Sidney Arbuthnot (m. 1912)
- Mother: Inga Houge

Tordis "Lillemor" Halvorsen (4 January 1884/1885 – 19 July 1955) was a Norwegian actress.

== Early and personal life ==
Tordis Halvorsen was born on 4 January 1884 in Bergen to actors Nicolai Halvorsen and Inga Houge. Her first marriage was to engineer Christian Mohr (1876–1908). After his death she married Captain Francis Sidney Arbuthnot in 1912.

== Career ==
At the age of 10, Halvorsen played the title role in Henrik Ibsen's Little Eyolf at the Christiania Theatre, alongside her father who played the role of Alfred Allmers. At the last performance at the Christiania Theatre on 15 June 1899, she was named as "Olaf" on the poster.

Like most people who worked at the Christiania Theatre, she went over to the National Theatre when it opened in 1899. It was here she made her second debut as Helga in Geografi og Kærlighed on 8 November 1900. She once again performed alongside her father in 1905 in Elias Kræmmer's Uncle Nabob, where she portrayed Ellen. Halvorsen was employed by the theatre until 31 October 1908, when she left to marry Christian Mohr and move to China.

Halvorsen returned to stage as Tordis Arbuthnot and performed in London at the Ambassadors Theatre, where she portrayed the role of Panthea in the play of the same name. She also played Blanche Bowden in Lucy Clifford's play A Woman Alone at the Little Theatre in London in July 1914.

== Death ==
Halvorsen died on 19 July 1955.
