= Twin Sisters (2013 film) =

- Film poster
- Norwegian: Tvillingsøstrene
- Directed by: Mona Friis Bertheussen
- Produced by: Mona Friis Bertheussen
- Starring: Mia Hansen; Alexandra Hauglum; Wenche Hauglum; Sigmund Hauglum; Angela Hansen; Andy Hansen
- Cinematography: Hallgrim Haug
- Edited by: Erik Andersson; Mona Friis Bertheussen
- Production company: Moment Film
- Release date: November 21, 2013 (IDFA)
- Running time: 58 minutes
- Country: Norway
- Languages: English; Norwegian

Twin Sisters is a documentary film released in 2013, directed by Mona Friis Bertheussen and produced by Moment Film. This film garnered significant acclaim, notably securing the Audience Award at the 2013 International Documentary Film Festival Amsterdam. Twin Sisters also received ten other awards and has been broadcast by over 30 television channels, reaching a global audience in the millions.

== Synopsis ==
The film begins in 2003, when two babies are discovered in a cardboard box in a Southern Chinese village. They are taken to an orphanage in Changsha, Hunan Province, China; where they are individually adopted by two separate families. One of the sisters, Alexandra Hauglum, grows up in the small village of Fresvik, Norway; surrounded by high mountains and deep fjords. The other sister, Mia Hansen, is raised in Sacramento, California; a much larger city in northern California.

The adoptive parents of the girls are unaware of their daughters' twin connection until a series of inexplicable incidents lead to their reunion. The film follows the sisters' lives until their reunion at Alexandra's home in Norway when they are eight years old.

== Production and filming ==
The production of "Twin Sisters" spanned approximately four years, during which director Mona Friis Bertheussen and cinematographer Hallgrim Haug traveled between Fresvik, Norway, and Sacramento, California. Funding for the film was secured from various sources. The film received its major funding from the Norwegian Film Institute, Creative Europe, the Norwegian television channel TV2, and Swedish television channel SVT. The film also received funding from Fond for Lyd og Bilde, Fritt Ord, Arts Council Norway, and Vest Norsk Filmsenter. It was pitched at the 2010 Sheffield Doc/Fest MeetMarket.

== Reception ==
In 2014, "Norway's TV2 reported that the film was its most watched documentary in more than four years". The New York Times reported that "Everything about the Norwegian film 'Twin Sisters' seems too good to be true". Mia and Alexandra were invited to be interviewed on the popular Scandinavian talk show, Skavlan.

In the United States, acclaim for the film came through the PBS series Independent Lens which began airing Twin Sisters in October 2014.

== Awards ==
- 2013 Audience Award, International Documentary Film Festival Amsterdam
- 2014 Best Documentary Film, Monte Carlo International Television Festival
- 2014 Best Director Award, National TV Awards, Gullruten
- 2014 Best Feature, Olympia Film Festival (Olympia Film Society)
