= Christen Christensen (politician) =

Norwegian military officer and politician

Christen Christensen (1826–1900) was a Norwegian military officer and politician.

He was born in Førde, but the family soon moved to Lærdal Municipality. As a military officer he became a lieutenant in 1845, and later colonel. He eventually settled in Vik Municipality, where he worked with post services, bank administration and breeding of farm animals, importing Leicester sheep from England.

As a politician he was mayor of Vik Municipality from 1858 to 1861 and 1866 to 1873. He served as a deputy representative to the Norwegian Parliament in 1862 and 1865.
