= Leikanger Municipality =

Former municipality in Sogn og Fjordane, Norway

Leikanger Municipality Leikanger kommune
- Former municipality
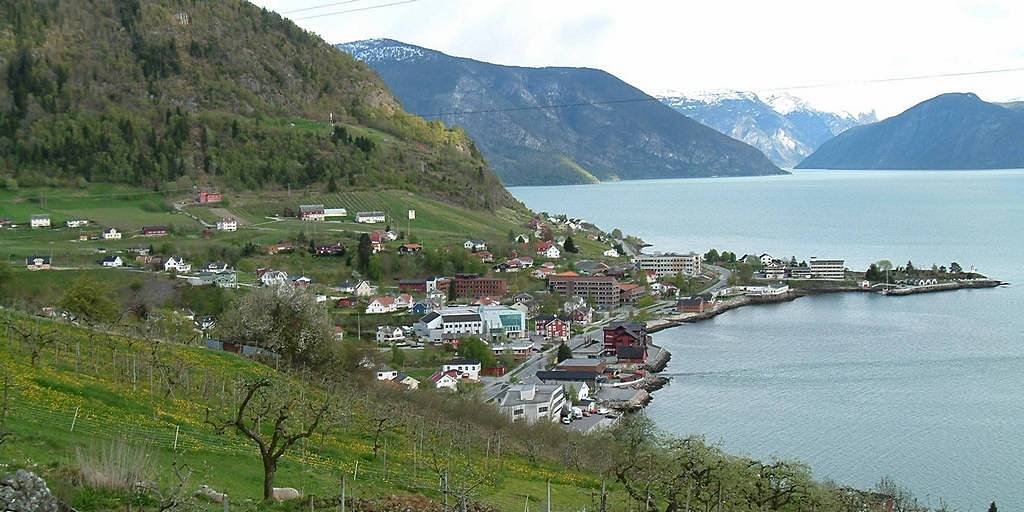
- View of Hermansverk

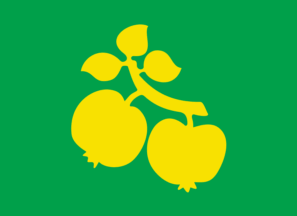
- Flag Coat of arms

- Sogn og Fjordane within Norway

- Leikanger within Sogn og Fjordane
- Coordinates: 61°13′51″N 06°47′23″E
- Country: Norway
- County: Sogn og Fjordane
- District: Sogn
- Established: 1 Jan 1838
  - Created as: Formannskapsdistrikt
- Disestablished: 1 Jan 2020
  - Succeeded by: Sogndal Municipality
- Administrative centre: Hermansverk

Government
  - Mayor (2015–2019): Jon Håkon Odd (Ap)

Area (upon dissolution)
  - Total: 180.10 km^{2} (69.54 sq mi)
  - Land: 177.44 km^{2} (68.51 sq mi)
  - Water: 2.66 km^{2} (1.03 sq mi) 1.5%
  - Rank: #342 in Norway
- Highest elevation: 1,604 m (5,262 ft)

Population (2019)
  - Total: 2,331
  - Rank: #302 in Norway
  - Density: 12.9/km^{2} (33/sq mi)
  - Change (10 years): ▲ +8.1%
- Demonym: Systrending

Official language
  - Norwegian form: Nynorsk
- Time zone: UTC+01:00 (CET)
  - Summer (DST): UTC+02:00 (CEST)
- ISO 3166 code: NO-1419

Leikanger (Urban East Norwegian: [ˈlæ̂ɪkɑŋər]) is a former municipality in Sogn og Fjordane county, Norway. It was located on the northern shore of the Sognefjorden in the traditional district of Sogn. The administrative center was the village of Hermansverk, which also was the administrative center of the old Sogn og Fjordane county.

Prior to its dissolution in 2020, the 180.1-square-kilometre (69.5 sq mi) municipality was the 342nd largest by area out of the 422 municipalities in Norway. Leikanger Municipality was the 302nd most populous municipality in Norway with a population of about 2,331. The municipality's population density was 12.9 inhabitants per square kilometre (33/sq mi) and its population had increased by 8.1% over the previous 10-year period.

The Leikanger/Hermansverk urban area had 2,144 inhabitants (2019), about 90% of the municipal population. This urban area is often called Systrond, which is why a person from Leikanger is often called Systrending.

== General information ==
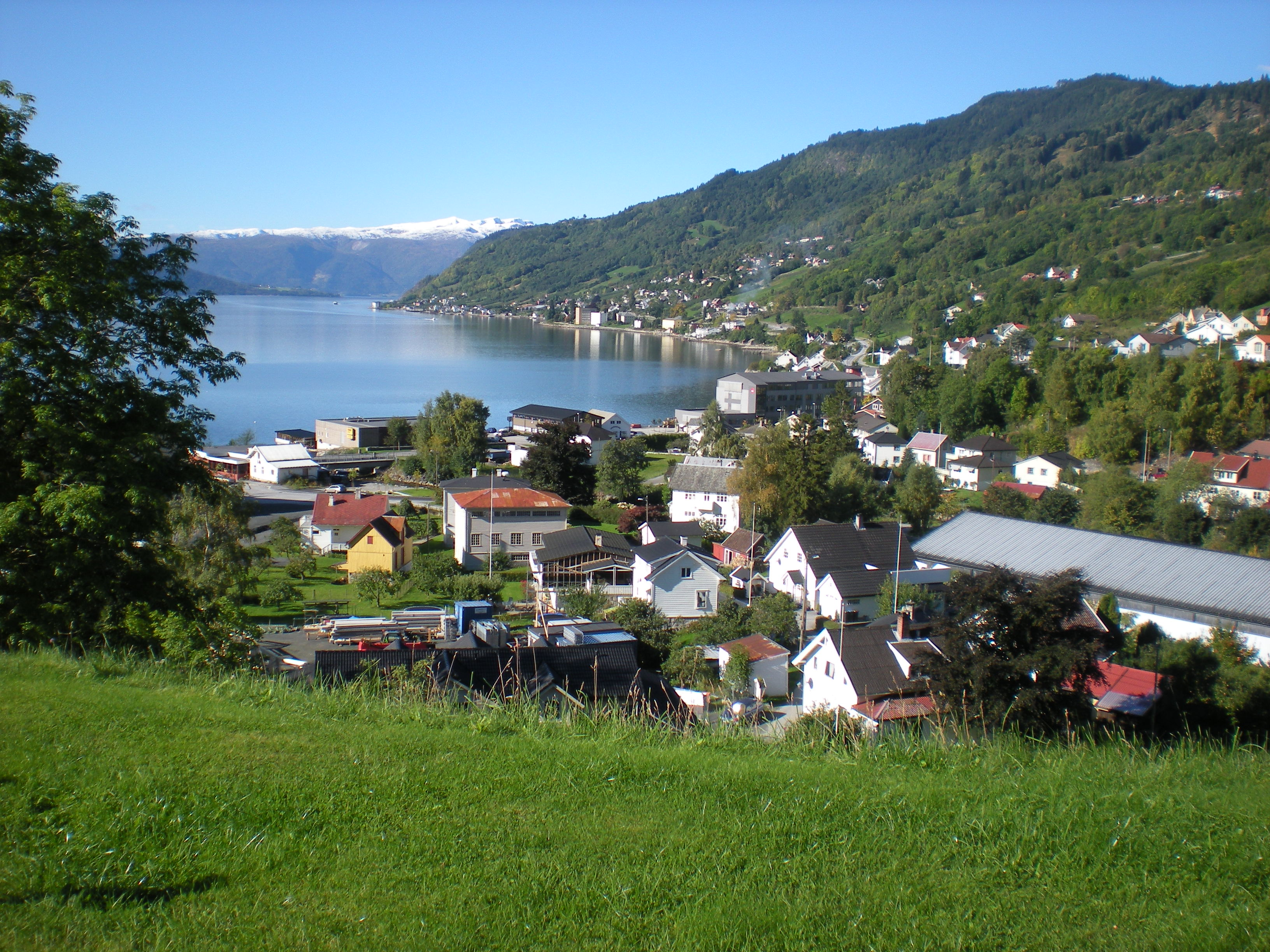
View of Systrond

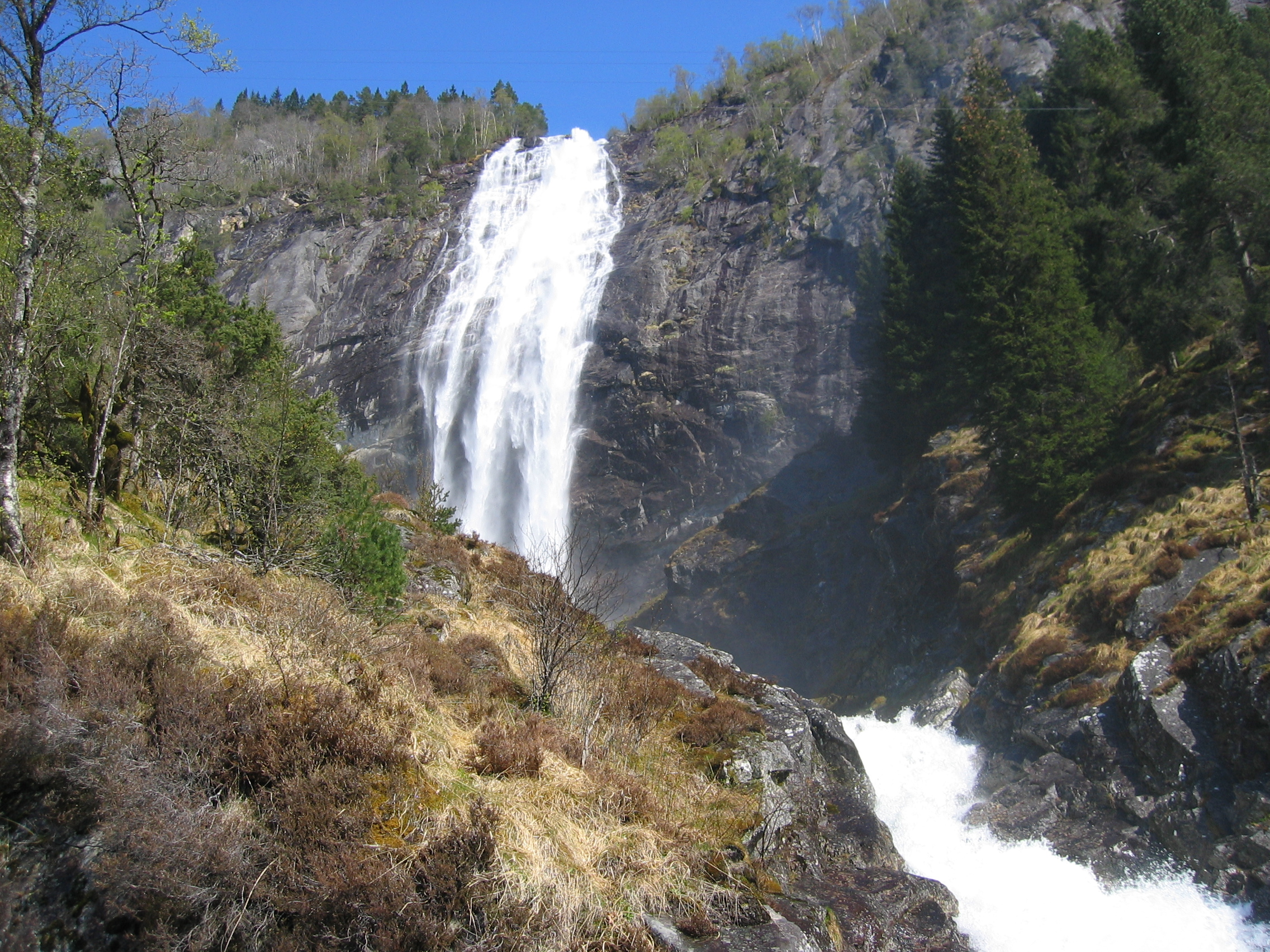
View of the Kvinnafossen in western Leikanger

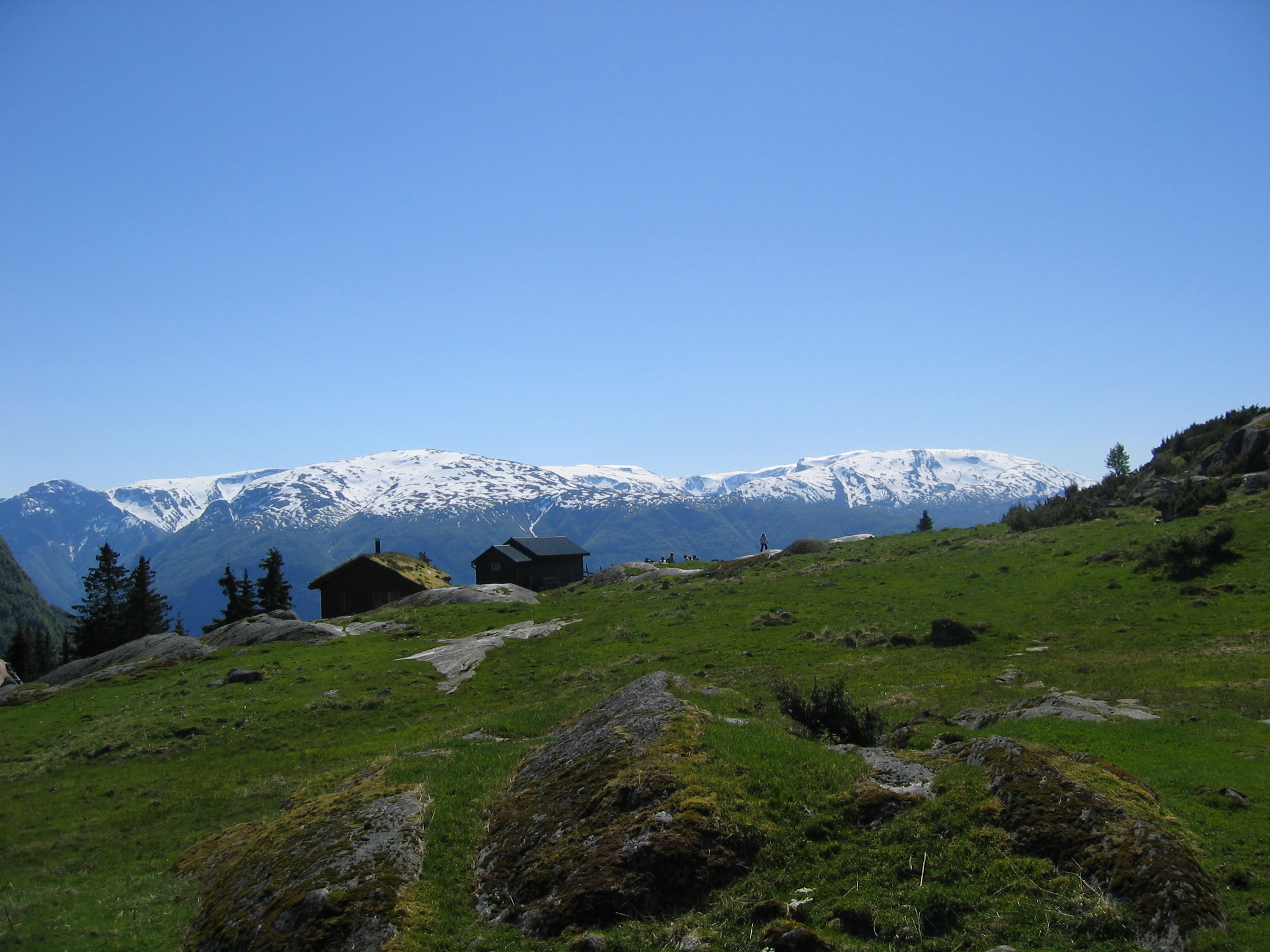
View of a small mountain farm

The parish of Leikanger was established as a municipality on 1 January 1838 (see formannskapsdistrikt law). The original municipality was quite large and it was identical to the old Leikanger Church of Norway prestegjeld with the six parishes (sokn) of Leikanger, Fresvik, Rinde, Vangsnes, Tjugum, and Mundal. In 1850, Leikanger Municipality was divided as follows:

- the parishes of Vangsnes, Tjugum, and Mundal (population: 2,122) became the new Balestrand Municipality
- the parishes of Leikanger, Fresvik, and Rinde (population: 2,368) continued on as a smaller Leikanger Municipality

During the 1960s, there were many municipal mergers across Norway due to the work of the Schei Committee. On 1 January 1964, the Hella-Eitorn area (population: 31) was transferred from Balestrand Municipality to Leikanger Municipality. Also, the Tingstad area (population: 5) was transferred from Leikanger Municipality to neighboring Sogndal Municipality. These changes left Leikanger Municipality with 2,680 residents.

On 1 January 1992, the parishes of Leikanger Municipality located south of the Sognefjorden, including Feios and Fresvik (total population: 572) were transferred to Vik Municipality. This move left Leikanger Municipality with only one parish: Leikanger.

Historically, this municipality was part of the old Sogn og Fjordane county. On 1 January 2020, the municipality became a part of the newly-formed Vestland county (after Hordaland and Sogn og Fjordane counties were merged). Also on that date, Leikanger Municipality was merged with the neighboring Balestrand Municipality and Sogndal Municipality to form a new, much larger Sogndal Municipality.

=== Name ===
The municipality (originally the parish) is named after the old Leikanger farm (Old Norse: Leikvangir) since the first Leikanger Church was built there. The first element is leikr which means "game", "sports", or "contest". The last element is the plural form of vangr which means "field" or "meadow". Thus it means a meadow used for sports or games. Prior to 1889, the name was written Lekanger.

=== Coat of arms ===
The coat of arms was granted on 5 September 1963. The official blazon is "Vert, two apples on a branch with three leaves Or" (Norwegian: På grøn botn to gull eple på kvist med tre lauv). This means the arms have a green field (background) and the charge is an apple tree branch with two apples and three leaves attached. The charge has a tincture of Or which means it is commonly colored yellow, but if it is made out of metal, then gold is used. The apple tree branch is a symbol for the many orchards in the municipality and thus for the local economy. The three leaves symbolised the three parishes (Leikanger, Feios, and Fresvik) that used to make up the municipality (before two of them were transferred to Vik Municipality in 1992). The arms were designed by K. Fotland. The municipal flag has the same design as the coat of arms.

=== Churches ===
The Church of Norway had one parish (sokn) within Leikanger Municipality. It was part of the Sogn prosti (deanery) in the Diocese of Bjørgvin.

Churches in Leikanger Municipality
Parish (sokn)	Church name	Location of the church	Year built
Leikanger	Leikanger Church	Leikanger	1166

== Government ==
While it existed, Leikanger Municipality was responsible for primary education (through 10th grade), outpatient health services, senior citizen services, welfare and other social services, zoning, economic development, and municipal roads and utilities. The municipality was governed by a municipal council of directly elected representatives. The mayor was indirectly elected by a vote of the municipal council. The municipality was under the jurisdiction of the Sogn og Fjordane District Court and the Gulating Court of Appeal.

=== Municipal council ===
The municipal council (Kommunestyre) of Leikanger Municipality was made up of 17 representatives that were elected to four year terms. The tables below show the historical composition of the council by political party.

Leikanger kommunestyre 2015–2019
Party name (in Nynorsk)	Number of representatives
Labour Party (Arbeidarpartiet)	7
Conservative Party (Høgre)	1
Centre Party (Senterpartiet)	5
Socialist Left Party (Sosialistisk Venstreparti)	1
Liberal Party (Venstre)	3
Total number of members:	17
Note: On 1 January 2020, Balestrand Municipality, Leikanger Municipality, and Sogndal Municipality were merged to form the new Sogndal Municipality.

Leikanger kommunestyre 2011–2015
Party name (in Nynorsk)	Number of representatives
Labour Party (Arbeidarpartiet)	7
Conservative Party (Høgre)	2
Centre Party (Senterpartiet)	3
Socialist Left Party (Sosialistisk Venstreparti)	2
Liberal Party (Venstre)	3
Total number of members:	17

Leikanger kommunestyre 2007–2011
Party name (in Nynorsk)	Number of representatives
Labour Party (Arbeidarpartiet)	7
Conservative Party (Høgre)	2
Centre Party (Senterpartiet)	3
Socialist Left Party (Sosialistisk Venstreparti)	2
Liberal Party (Venstre)	3
Total number of members:	17

Leikanger kommunestyre 2003–2007
Party name (in Nynorsk)	Number of representatives
Labour Party (Arbeidarpartiet)	7
Conservative Party (Høgre)	2
Christian Democratic Party (Kristeleg Folkeparti)	1
Centre Party (Senterpartiet)	3
Socialist Left Party (Sosialistisk Venstreparti)	2
Liberal Party (Venstre)	2
Total number of members:	17

Leikanger kommunestyre 1999–2003
Party name (in Nynorsk)	Number of representatives
Labour Party (Arbeidarpartiet)	7
Conservative Party (Høgre)	3
Christian Democratic Party (Kristeleg Folkeparti)	1
Centre Party (Senterpartiet)	1
Socialist Left Party (Sosialistisk Venstreparti)	2
Liberal Party (Venstre)	3
Total number of members:	17

Leikanger kommunestyre 1995–1999
Party name (in Nynorsk)	Number of representatives
Labour Party (Arbeidarpartiet)	7
Conservative Party (Høgre)	2
Christian Democratic Party (Kristeleg Folkeparti)	1
Centre Party (Senterpartiet)	3
Socialist Left Party (Sosialistisk Venstreparti)	1
Liberal Party (Venstre)	3
Total number of members:	17

Leikanger kommunestyre 1991–1995
Party name (in Nynorsk)	Number of representatives
Labour Party (Arbeidarpartiet)	9
Conservative Party (Høgre)	3
Christian Democratic Party (Kristeleg Folkeparti)	2
Centre Party (Senterpartiet)	3
Socialist Left Party (Sosialistisk Venstreparti)	2
Liberal Party (Venstre)	2
Total number of members:	21

Leikanger kommunestyre 1987–1991
Party name (in Nynorsk)	Number of representatives
Labour Party (Arbeidarpartiet)	9
Conservative Party (Høgre)	4
Christian Democratic Party (Kristeleg Folkeparti)	2
Centre Party (Senterpartiet)	3
Socialist Left Party (Sosialistisk Venstreparti)	1
Liberal Party (Venstre)	2
Total number of members:	21

Leikanger kommunestyre 1983–1987
Party name (in Nynorsk)	Number of representatives
Labour Party (Arbeidarpartiet)	9
Conservative Party (Høgre)	4
Christian Democratic Party (Kristeleg Folkeparti)	2
Centre Party (Senterpartiet)	2
Socialist Left Party (Sosialistisk Venstreparti)	1
Liberal Party (Venstre)	2
Cross-party common list (Tverrpolitisk Samlingsliste)	1
Total number of members:	21

Leikanger kommunestyre 1979–1983
Party name (in Nynorsk)	Number of representatives
Labour Party (Arbeidarpartiet)	8
Conservative Party (Høgre)	4
Christian Democratic Party (Kristeleg Folkeparti)	2
New People's Party (Nye Folkepartiet)	1
Centre Party (Senterpartiet)	3
Liberal Party (Venstre)	2
Cross-party common list (Tverrpolitisk Samlingsliste)	1
Total number of members:	21

Leikanger kommunestyre 1975–1979
Party name (in Nynorsk)	Number of representatives
Labour Party (Arbeidarpartiet)	8
Conservative Party (Høgre)	3
Christian Democratic Party (Kristeleg Folkeparti)	3
New People's Party (Nye Folkepartiet)	1
Centre Party (Senterpartiet)	3
Socialist Left Party (Sosialistisk Venstreparti)	1
Liberal Party (Venstre)	2
Total number of members:	21

Leikanger kommunestyre 1971–1975
Party name (in Nynorsk)	Number of representatives
Labour Party (Arbeidarpartiet)	9
Conservative Party (Høgre)	2
Christian Democratic Party (Kristeleg Folkeparti)	3
Centre Party (Senterpartiet)	4
Liberal Party (Venstre)	3
Total number of members:	21

Leikanger kommunestyre 1967–1971
Party name (in Nynorsk)	Number of representatives
Labour Party (Arbeidarpartiet)	8
Conservative Party (Høgre)	2
Christian Democratic Party (Kristeleg Folkeparti)	2
Centre Party (Senterpartiet)	4
Liberal Party (Venstre)	5
Total number of members:	21

Leikanger kommunestyre 1963–1967
Party name (in Nynorsk)	Number of representatives
Labour Party (Arbeidarpartiet)	8
Conservative Party (Høgre)	2
Christian Democratic Party (Kristeleg Folkeparti)	1
Centre Party (Senterpartiet)	3
Socialist People's Party (Sosialistisk Folkeparti)	1
Liberal Party (Venstre)	6
Total number of members:	21

Leikanger heradsstyre 1959–1963
Party name (in Nynorsk)	Number of representatives
Labour Party (Arbeidarpartiet)	9
Conservative Party (Høgre)	1
Christian Democratic Party (Kristeleg Folkeparti)	1
Centre Party (Senterpartiet)	3
Liberal Party (Venstre)	7
Total number of members:	21

Leikanger heradsstyre 1955–1959
Party name (in Nynorsk)	Number of representatives
Labour Party (Arbeidarpartiet)	9
Farmers' Party (Bondepartiet)	2
Liberal Party (Venstre)	7
Joint List(s) of Non-Socialist Parties (Borgarlege Felleslister)	3
Total number of members:	21

Leikanger heradsstyre 1951–1955
Party name (in Nynorsk)	Number of representatives
Labour Party (Arbeidarpartiet)	13
Farmers' Party (Bondepartiet)	4
Liberal Party (Venstre)	10
Joint List(s) of Non-Socialist Parties (Borgarlege Felleslister)	5
Total number of members:	32

Leikanger heradsstyre 1947–1951
Party name (in Nynorsk)	Number of representatives
Labour Party (Arbeidarpartiet)	15
Liberal Party (Venstre)	4
Joint List(s) of Non-Socialist Parties (Borgarlege Felleslister)	13
Total number of members:	32

Leikanger heradsstyre 1945–1947
Party name (in Nynorsk)	Number of representatives
Labour Party (Arbeidarpartiet)	8
List of workers, fishermen, and small farmholders (Arbeidarar, fiskarar, småbrukarar liste)	8
Joint List(s) of Non-Socialist Parties (Borgarlege Felleslister)	16
Total number of members:	32

Leikanger heradsstyre 1937–1941*
Party name (in Nynorsk)	Number of representatives
Labour Party (Arbeidarpartiet)	11
Farmers' Party (Bondepartiet)	2
Liberal Party (Venstre)	5
Joint List(s) of Non-Socialist Parties (Borgarlege Felleslister)	11
Local List(s) (Lokale lister)	3
Total number of members:	32
Note: Due to the German occupation of Norway during World War II, no elections were held for new municipal councils until after the war ended in 1945.

=== Mayors ===
The mayor (Nynorsk: ordførar) of Leikanger Municipality was the political leader of the municipality and the chairperson of the municipal council. The following people held this position:

- 1838–1839: Christian Garup Meidell
- 1840–1843: Søren Lem
- 1844–1847: Herman Brun
- 1848–1849: Harald Ulrik Sverdrup
- 1849–1851: Herman Brun
- 1852–1853: Hans Johannes Brun
- 1854–1857: Johan David Haslund
- 1858–1868: Sjur Sæterlid
- 1868–1868: Hans Lem
- 1868–1869: Johan Herman Brun
- 1870–1873: Nils J. Njøs
- 1874–1881: Lars M. Husabø
- 1882–1884: Jakob Liv Rosted Sverdrup
- 1885–1901: Jakob Bøthun
- 1902–1907: Lars M. Husabø
- 1908–1916: Nils Tjønn
- 1917–1919: Hans N. Grinde
- 1920–1922: Hans Fleche
- 1922–1922: Knut Jordal
- 1923–1934: Hans N. Grinde
- 1935–1951: Olav Tveit (V)
- 1952–1957: Per H. Bøthun (V)
- 1958–1961: Hans Husabø (V)
- 1962–1963: Leiv Loen (V)
- 1964–1975: Arne Grepstad (V)
- 1975–1975: Olav Straume (KrF)
- 1976–1977: Lars Lefdal (H)
- 1978–1979: Kåre Næss (KrF)
- 1980–1983: Ola A. Vestrheim (H)
- 1984–1987: Erling Olsen (Ap)
- 1988–1991: Ola A. Vestrheim (H)
- 1992–1993: Kjell Helleland (Ap)
- 1994–1995: Åsta Magni Hauge (Ap)
- 1996–1999: Nils Erling Yndesdal (V)
- 2000–2003: Rolf Nesheim (V)
- 2003–2015: Olav Lunden (Ap)
- 2015–2019: Jon Håkon Odd (Ap)

== Geography ==
Leikanger Municipality was located on the north side of the Sognefjorden and to the east of the Fjærlandsfjorden. It was bordered on the north and east by Sogndal Municipality, on the west by Balestrand Municipality, and on the south (across the Sognefjorden) by Vik Municipality. The highest point in the municipality was the 1,604-metre (5,262 ft) tall mountain Gunvordalsbreen.

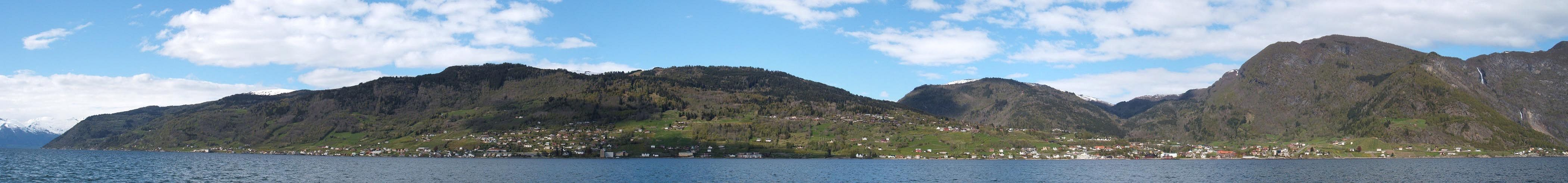
View of the main village of Hermansverk/Leikanger in Leikanger Municipality

== Buildings and structures ==
East of Leikanger, there are the Sognefjord Spans, three powerline spans with length over 4 kilometres (2.5 mi), which are currently the 2nd, 3rd, and 4th longest spans in the world. In 1955, the first Sognefjord Span was built near Leikanger. It was the longest span in the world from 1955 until 1997.

== Sister cities/Twin towns ==
Leikanger has sister city agreements with the following places:

- Ribe, Denmark

== Notable people ==
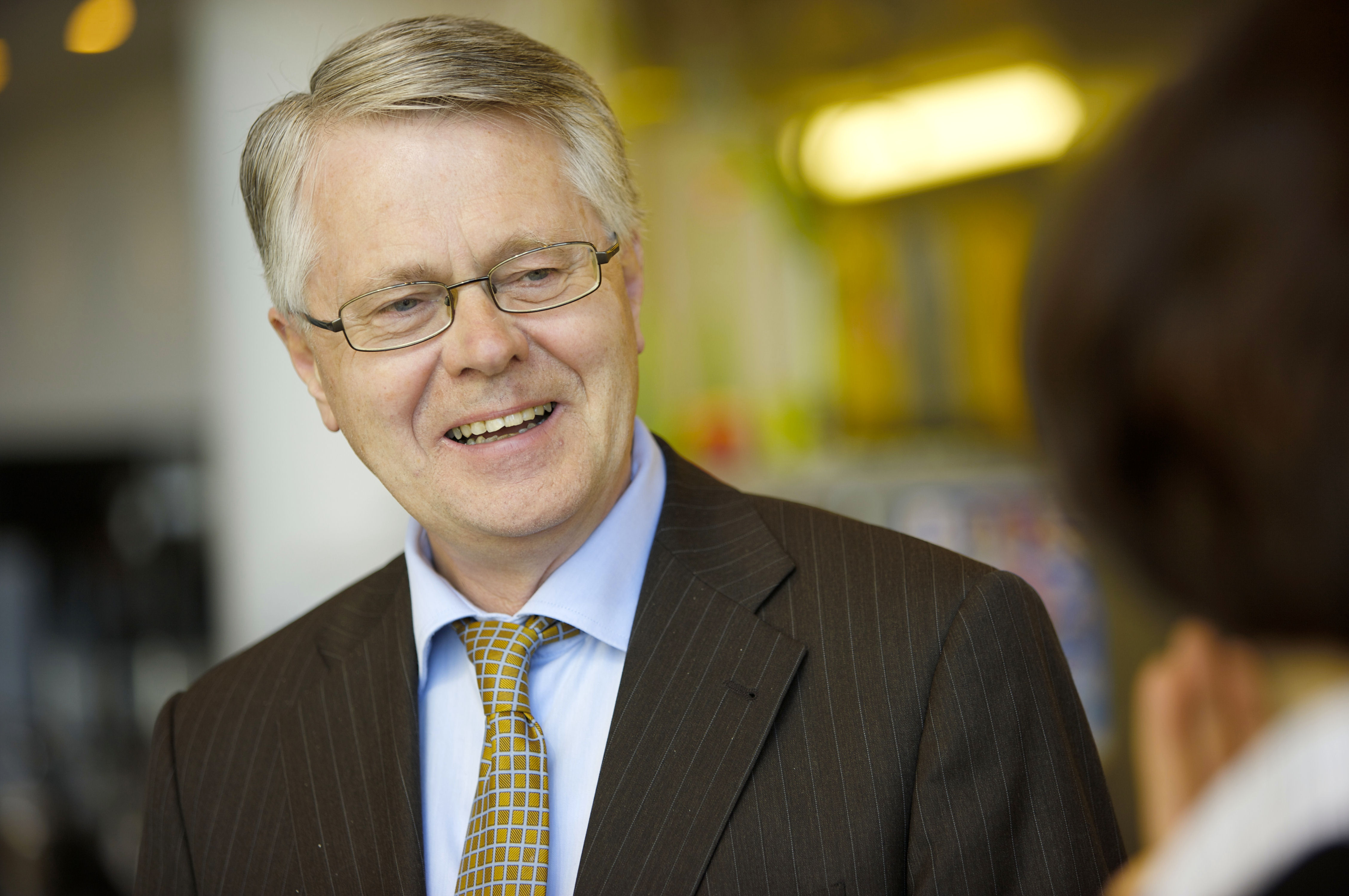
Oddvar Flæte, 2009

- Iver Erikssøn Leganger (1629 in Leikanger – 1702), a priest, author, and farm owner
- Georg Burchard Jersin (1767 in Leikanger – 1827), a Lutheran minister and representative on the Norwegian Constitutional Assembly
- Olaf Huseby (1856 in Leikanger – 1942), a Norwegian-American bookseller and publisher
- Jakob Sverdrup (1881 in Leikanger – 1938), a Norwegian philologist and lexicographer
- Kjell Bondevik (1901 in Leikanger – 1983), a Norwegian politician who also wrote history books
- Oddvar Flæte (born 1944 in Leikanger), a politician who was County Governor of Sogn og Fjordane from 1994-2011
- Silje Nes (born 1980 in Leikanger), a multi-instrumentalist, singer, and sound artist
- Elise Thorsnes (born 1988 in Leikanger), a footballer who played 125 games with the Norway women's national football team

== See also ==
- List of former municipalities of Norway
