= Fresvik =

Village in Vik Municipality, Norway

- Village
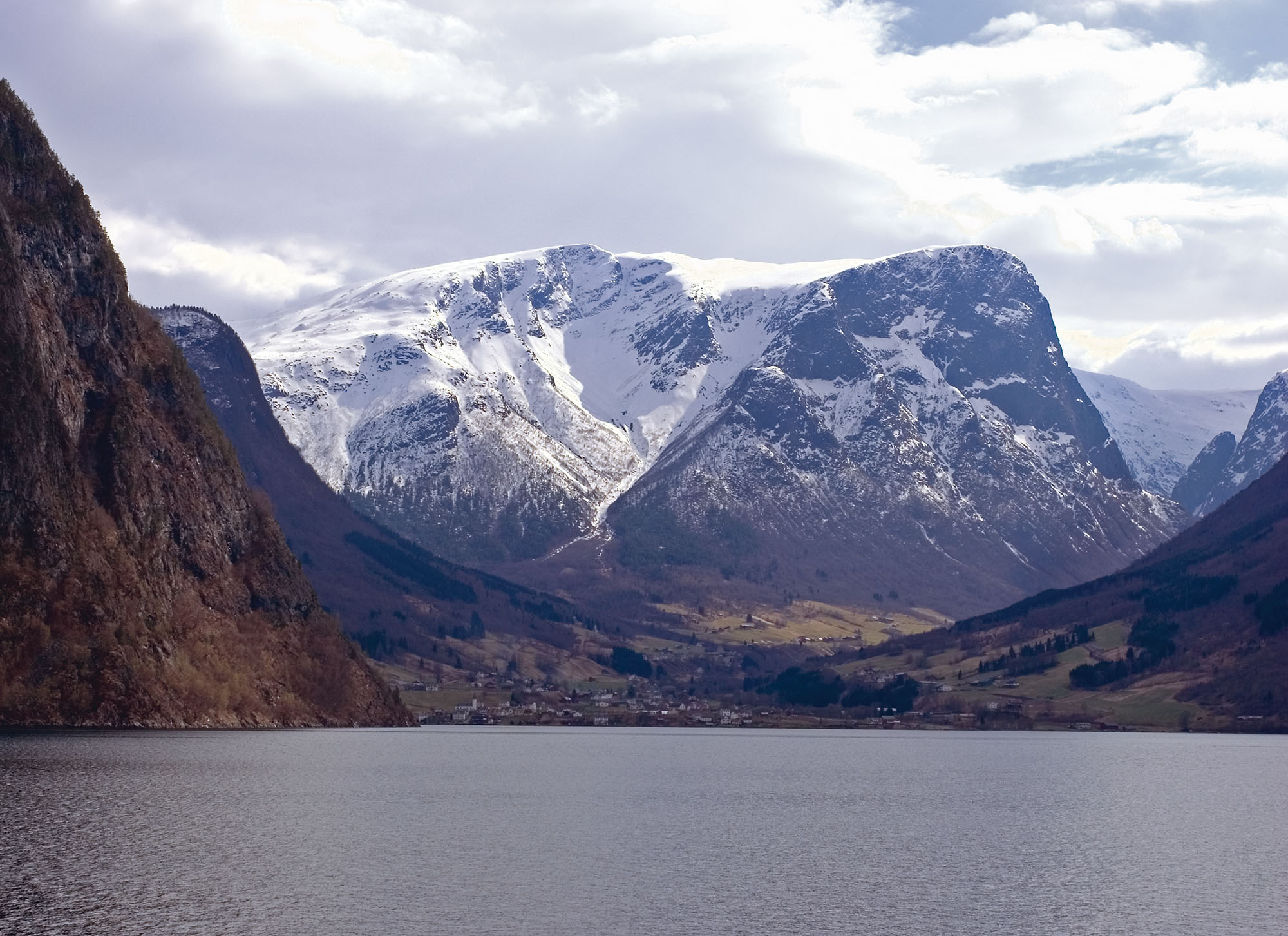
- View of Fresvik
- Interactive map of Fresvik
- Location within Vestland Location within Norway
- Coordinates: 61.07228°N 6.93416°E
- Country: Norway
- Region: Western Norway
- County: Vestland
- District: Sogn
- Municipality: Vik Municipality
- Elevation: 20 m (66 ft)

Population (2001)
  - Total: 275
- Time zone: UTC+01:00 (CET)
  - Summer (DST): UTC+02:00 (CEST)
- Post Code: 6896 Fresvik

Fresvik is a village in Vik Municipality in Vestland county, Norway. It is located on the southern shore of the Sognefjorden, just west of where the Aurlandsfjorden joins the Sognefjorden. Fresvik sits about 13 kilometres (8.1 mi) south of Leikanger-Hermansverk, about 20 kilometres (12 mi) east of the municipal center of Vikøyri, and about 15 kilometres (9.3 mi) southeast of the village of Feios. The population (2001) of Fresvik is approximately 275.

This village provides a starting point for hikes into the UNESCO World Heritage Site of Nærøyfjord which is 11 kilometres (6.8 mi) south, and also to the Fresvikbreen glacier which is 8 kilometres (5.0 mi) west of the village. Fresvik has been hosting the Fres music festival in July annually since 2005. Fresvik Church is located in the village, serving the eastern part of the municipality.

== Economy ==
Agriculture is one of the main industries around Fresvik. Some of the main agricultural products are fruit and berries (mainly strawberries) and there are also some lush mountain pastures for cattle or sheep. There is also the Fresvik produkt factory which produces refrigeration equipment.

== History ==
Fresvik was an isolated valley community until 1976. People could only access the village by boat on the Sognefjorden. In 1976, a road from Feios to Fresvik was completed, marking the first time there was a road connection to the village. Historically, Fresvik had been a part of Leikanger Municipality since the main part of Leikanger is located directly north (across the fjord). After the road was completed to Fresvik from Feios and westward into Vik Municipality, discussions began about municipal borders since Fresvik now was more easily connected to Vik Municipality rather than a 10-kilometre (6.2 mi) boat ride across the huge Sognefjorden. As of 1 January 1992, Fresvik and its surroundings (all of Leikanger Municipality that was south of the fjord and west of the Aurlandsfjorden) were transferred to Vik Municipality.

== Name ==
The village (and parish) is named after the old Fresvik farm (Old Norse: Frøysvík) since the Fresvik Church was built there. The first element is the genitive of the name of the god Freyr and the last element is vík which means "inlet" or "bay". Another, less common theory is that is originates from settlement/farmstead of Frisians. The name has similarities to the Scottish Highland hamlet Freswick and with the town of Vreeswijk in the Netherlands. The name Freswick could mean 'Frisians wic' The place name Vreeswijk stemms from the medieval name Fresionovvic (11th century) meaning settlement of Frisians.

== Notable people ==
- Mensen Ernst, a long distance runner
- Alexandra Hauglum (b. 2003), star of the 2013 documentary "Twin Sisters" (which features Fresvik). The film was produced and directed by Mona Friis Bertheussen, and later aired on public television in the USA. This film features Chinese-born adoptee Alexandra Hauglum and her parents, residents of Fresvik, as well as her twin sister Mia Hansen, adopted separately by parents from Sacramento, California in the USA.

== See also ==
- Freswick, Scotland
- Friezenwijk (Heukelum), the Netherlands
- Vreeswijk, the Netherlands
