= Inga Houge =

Norwegian actress (1856–1926)

- Born: Inga Margrethe Houge; 3 May 1856; Vik Municipality, Norway
- Died: 11 February 1926 (aged 69); Oslo, Norway
- Occupation: Actress
- Spouse: Nicolai Halvorsen (m. 1883; died 1922)
- Children: Tordis Halvorsen

Inga Margrethe Houge (3 May 1856 – 11 February 1926) was a Norwegian stage actress and chief controller of the National Theatre.

== Early and personal life ==
Inga Margrethe Houge was born on 3 May 1856 in Vik Municipality in Sogn, and was the tenth child of priest and provost Christian Severin Flinthoug Houge and Susanna Maria Theresia Bruun. She was named after her sister, Inga Margrethe Houge who died in 1855 at the age of 16 while performing a play in Bergen. On 7 August 1883, Houge married fellow actor Nicolai Halvorsen in Christiania. The couple only had one child together, Tordis Halvorsen, who was also an actress.

== Career ==
After her father's death in the early 1870s, Houge moved to Christiania, where she drew attention with her talent for skating. On 4 February 1883, Houge made her stage debut at the Den Nationale Scene in Bergen in the minor role of Agnes in En Fristerinde. Critics noted that her role was too small for an overall opinion, but they praised her line delivery and stage presence. After her marriage, she took on fewer roles but continued to perform in minor roles with her husband at the Christiania Theatre, after they moved there during the 1890s. In later life, Houge worked as chief controller at the National Theatre in Christiania since its opening.

== Death ==
Houge died after a short illness on 11 February 1926 at a parish nursing home in Oslo, at the age of 69. Her funeral took place four days later on 15 February, and was attended by many representatives of the National Theatre. Singer Olav Sverénus also performed at the funeral.
