= Fresvik Church =

Church in Vestland, Norway

- Fresvik kyrkje
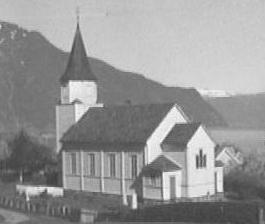
- View of the church
- Fresvik Church
- 61°04′24″N 6°56′22″E
- Location: Vik Municipality, Vestland
- Country: Norway
- Denomination: Church of Norway
- Previous denomination: Catholic Church
- Churchmanship: Evangelical Lutheran

History
- Status: Parish church
- Founded: 12th century
- Consecrated: 29 June 1881

Architecture
- Functional status: Active
- Architect: Johannes Henrik Nissen
- Architectural type: Long church
- Completed: 1881 (145 years ago)

Specifications
- Capacity: 200
- Materials: Wood

Administration
- Diocese: Bjørgvin bispedømme
- Deanery: Sogn prosti
- Parish: Fresvik
- Norwegian Cultural Heritage Site
- Type: Church
- Status: Listed
- ID: 84197

Fresvik Church (Norwegian: Fresvik kyrkje) is a parish church of the Church of Norway in Vik Municipality in Vestland county, Norway. It is located in the village of Fresvik, along the southern shore of the Sognefjorden. It is the church for the Fresvik parish which is part of the Sogn prosti (deanery) in the Diocese of Bjørgvin. The white, wooden church was built in a long church design in 1881 using plans drawn up by the architect Johannes Henrik Nissen. The church seats about 200 people.

== History ==
The earliest existing historical records of the church date back to the year 1340, but it was not new that year. The first church was a wooden stave church that was likely built during the 12th century. This church stood for hundreds of years on the same site as the present church. In the mid-1600s, the church was enlarged. The old choir was converted into a sacristy and the old nave was turned into the choir, and finally, a new nave was built to the west of the old church. The new nave measured about 9.5 by 8.8 metres (31 ft × 29 ft) and the new choir (old nave) measured about 7 by 6 metres (23 ft × 20 ft) and the new sacristy (old choir) measured about 4.3 by 4 metres (14 ft × 13 ft). A new 2.8-by-2.8-metre (9 ft 2 in × 9 ft 2 in) church porch was also built at the same time.

By the 1860s, people in the parish began asking for a new church because the church was too small for the parish. At that time, the church was privately owned and the owners did not want to pay money to enlarge the church or build a new one. They wanted to parish to pay. In 1869, the parish purchased the old church for 200 speciedaler with the plan to tear down the church and build a new one on the same site. The church was designed by Henrik Nissen and the lead builder was A.A. Åse. In 1881, the church was torn down and replaced with a new church on the same site. The new church was consecrated on 29 June 1881 by the local Dean Jacob Edward Smith. In 1961, the church was wired for electric lights and two years later, in 1963, electric heating was installed.

== Media gallery ==
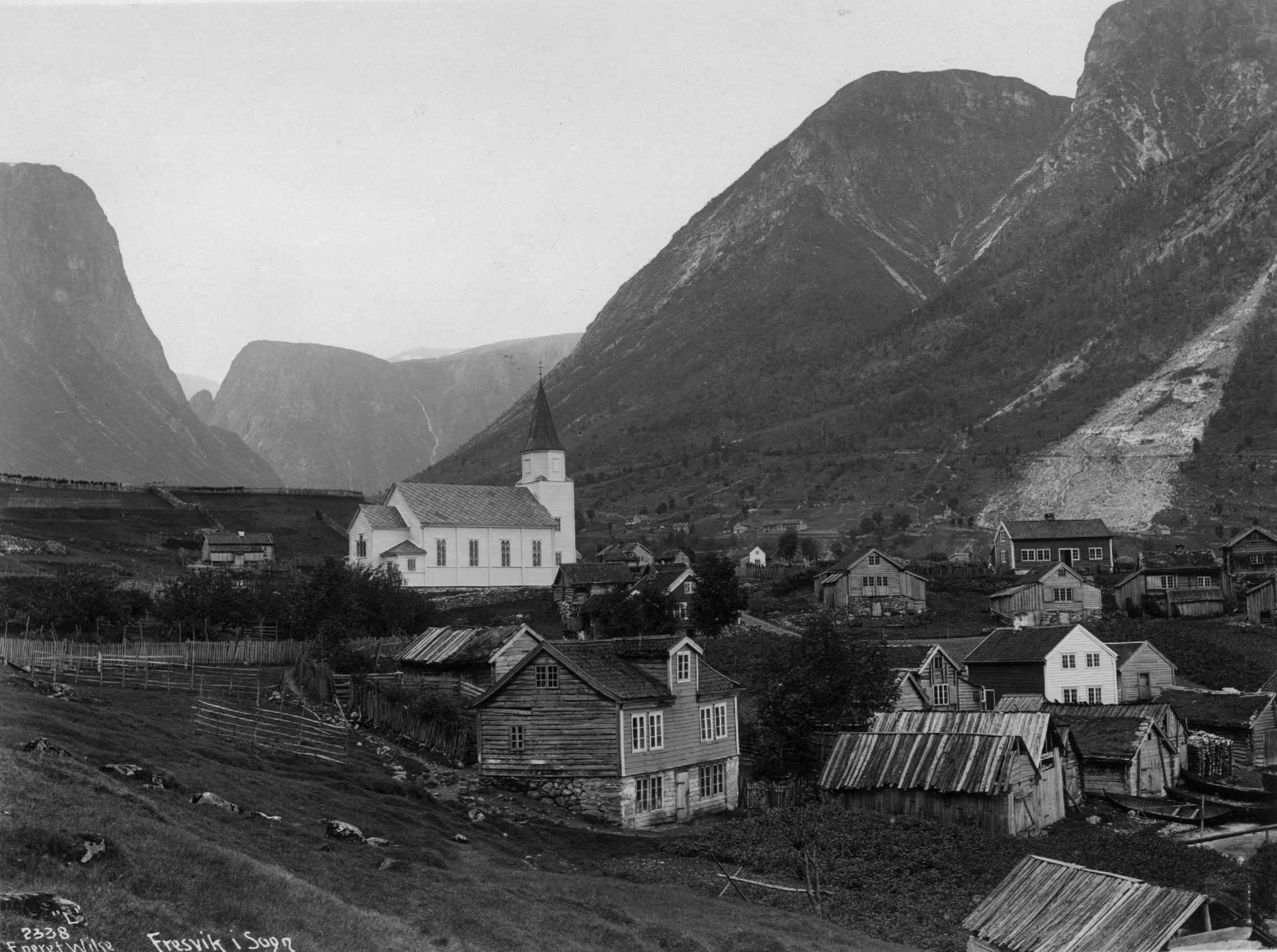

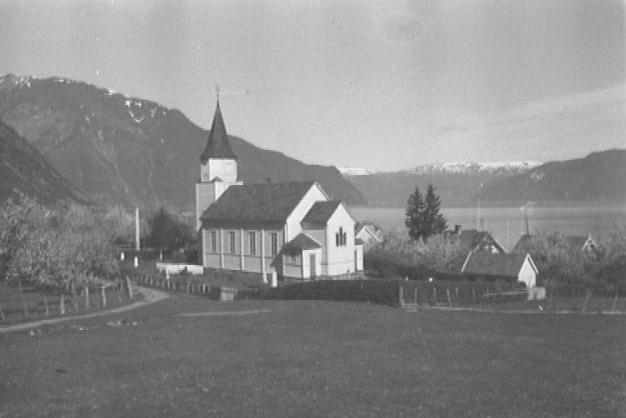

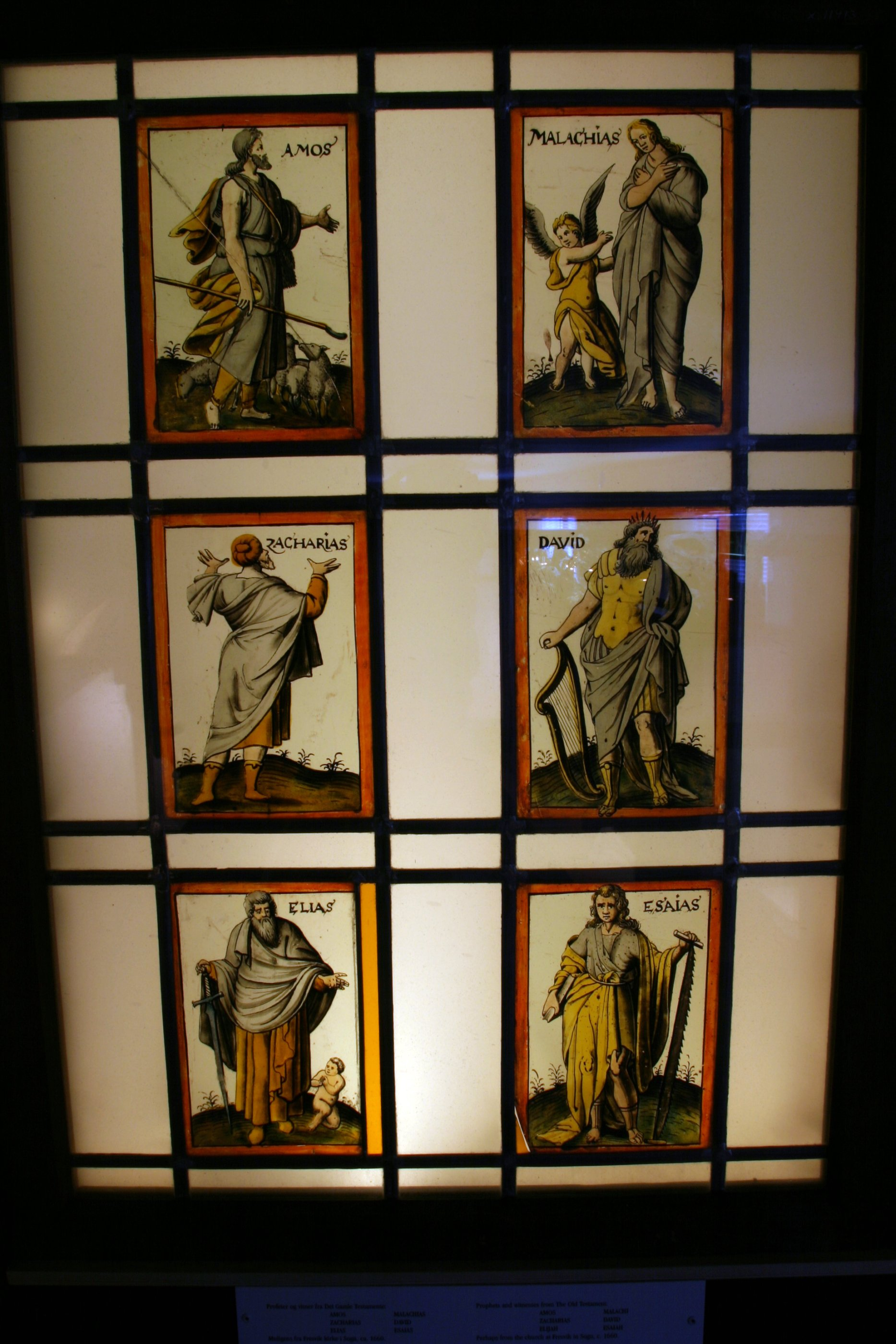

== See also ==
- List of churches in Bjørgvin
