= Feios =

Village in Vik Municipality, Norway

- Village
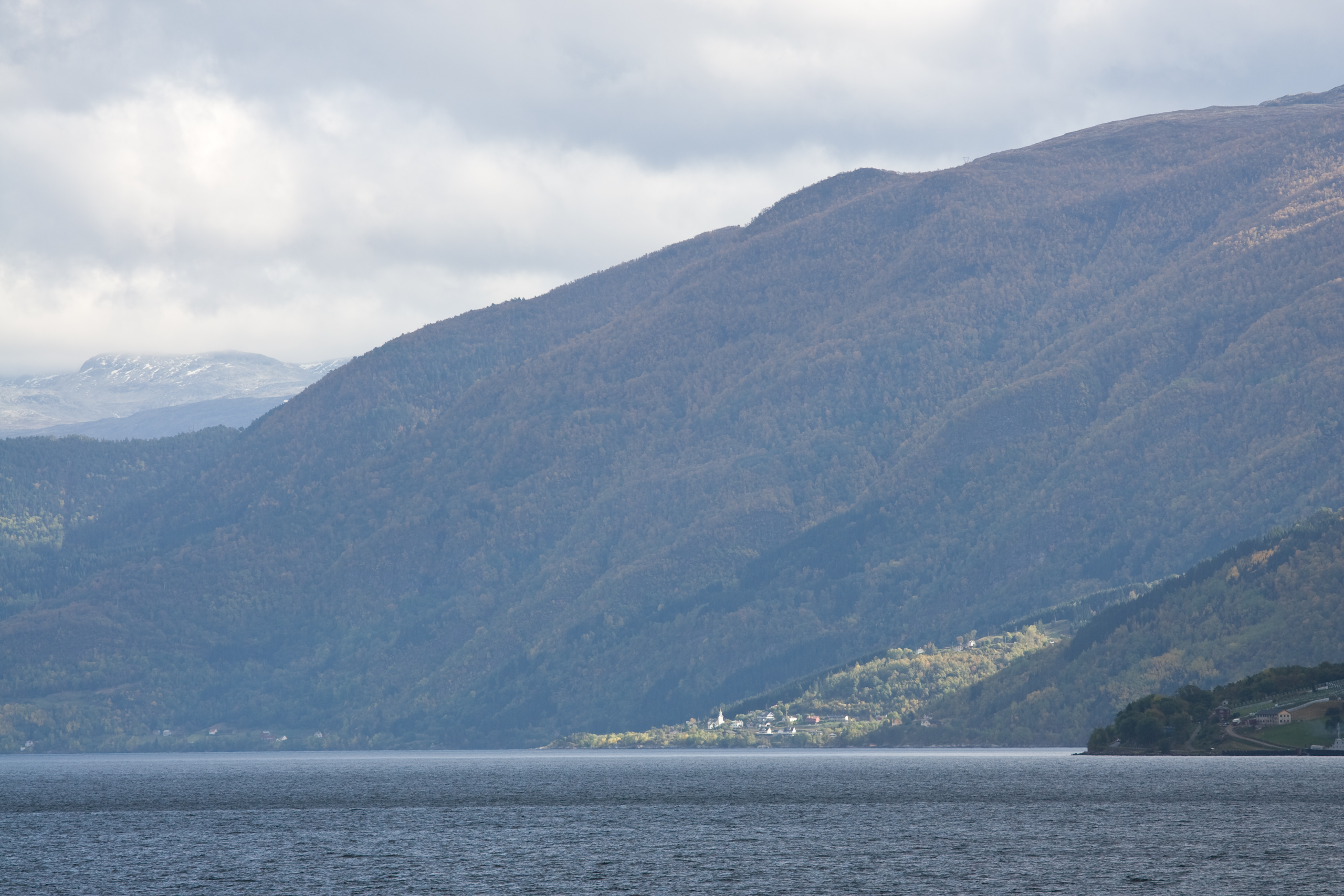
- View of the village (from across the fjord)
- Interactive map of Feios
- Location within Vestland Location within Norway
- Coordinates: 61.14897°N 6.75443°E
- Country: Norway
- Region: Western Norway
- County: Vestland
- District: Sogn
- Municipality: Vik Municipality
- Elevation: 19 m (62 ft)
- Time zone: UTC+01:00 (CET)
  - Summer (DST): UTC+02:00 (CEST)
- Post Code: 6895 Feios

Feios is a village in Vik Municipality in Vestland county, Norway. The village is located on the southern shore of the Sognefjorden, about 8 kilometres (5.0 mi) southeast of the village of Vangsnes and about 17 kilometres (11 mi) northwest of the village of Fresvik. The village lies in a small, narrow valley, surrounded by large mountains, with the river Feioselvi running through the center of the valley. Feios Church is located in the village.

A good portion of the population is engaged in agriculture, especially fruits such as apples, pears, plums, strawberries, and raspberries on farms and gardens in the village. Historically, the village has been famous for its beautiful fruit blossoms. Fruit cultivation has slowed somewhat in recent years. Raising cattle, sheep, and horses are also done on the farms in this valley.

== History ==
Feios was an isolated valley community until 1971. People could only access the village by boat along the Sognefjorden. In 1971, a road from Vangsnes to Feios was completed, marking the first time ever that there was a road connection to the village. In 1976, the road was completed from Feios to Fresvik. Historically, Feios (and Fresvik) had been a part of Leikanger Municipality since the main part of Leikanger is located directly north (across the fjord). After the road was completed to Feios and Fresvik from Vik Municipality, discussions began about municipal borders since both villages now were more easily connected to Vik rather than a 5-to-10-kilometre (3.1 to 6.2 mi) boat ride across the huge Sognefjord. As of 1 January 1992, Fresvik, Feios, and their surroundings (all of Leikanger Municipality that was south of the fjord and west of the Aurlandsfjorden) were transferred to Vik Municipality.
