= Neşe =

Neşe is a common Turkish given name. In Turkish, neşe means "joy", "happiness", or "cheerfulness", representing a state of positive emotion and lively spirit.

== People ==
=== Given name ===
- Neşe Aybey (1930-2015), Turkish miniaturist
- Neşe Erberk (born 1964), Turkish businesswoman
- Nese Erdok (born 1940), Turkish painter
- Neşe Karaböcek (born 1947), Turkish singer
- Neşe Mercan (born 1994), Turkish Paralympian goalball player
- Neşe Şensoy Yıldız (born 1974), Turkish judoka
- Neşe Yaşın (born 1959), Turkish Cypriot writer
- Neşe Zara Yılmaz, Turkish folk music singer and actress
