= Vik, Sogn =

Municipality in Vestland, Norway

Vik Municipality Vik kommune
- Municipality
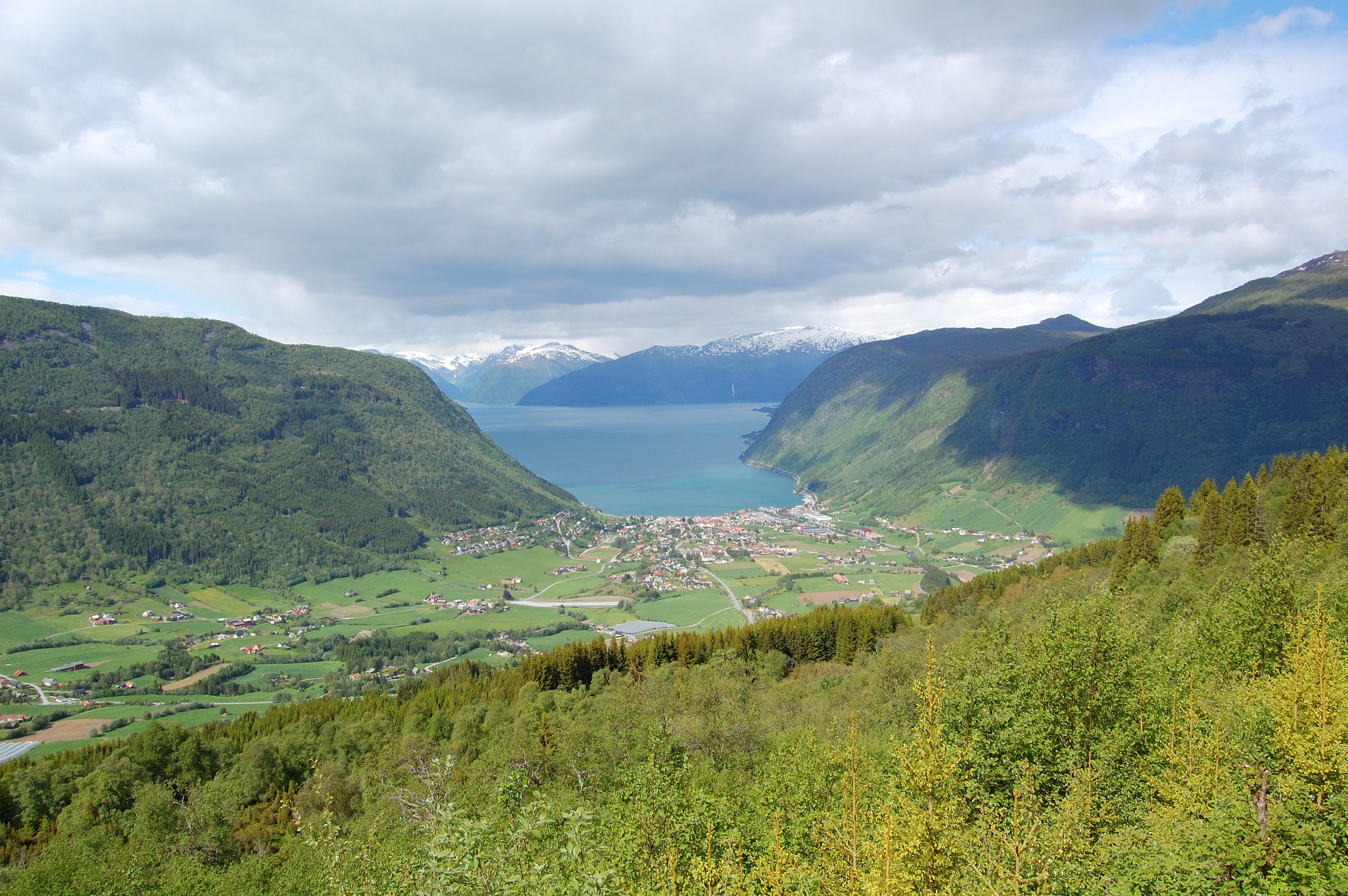

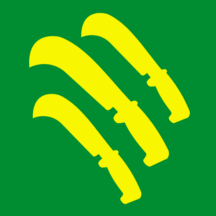
- Flag Coat of arms

- Vestland within Norway

- Vik within Vestland
- Coordinates: 61°03′25″N 06°34′41″E
- Country: Norway
- County: Vestland
- District: Sogn
- Established: 1 Jan 1838
  - Created as: Formannskapsdistrikt
- Administrative centre: Vikøyri

Government
  - Mayor (2019): Roy Egil Stadheim (Ap)

Area
  - Total: 833.21 km^{2} (321.70 sq mi)
  - Land: 794.91 km^{2} (306.92 sq mi)
  - Water: 38.30 km^{2} (14.79 sq mi) 4.6%
  - Rank: #137 in Norway
- Highest elevation: 1,640.14 m (5,381.0 ft)

Population (2025)
  - Total: 2,550
  - Rank: #250 in Norway
  - Density: 3.1/km^{2} (8.0/sq mi)
  - Change (10 years): ▼ −5.1%
- Demonym(s): Vikje (male); Vikja (female)

Official language
  - Norwegian form: Nynorsk
- Time zone: UTC+01:00 (CET)
  - Summer (DST): UTC+02:00 (CEST)
- ISO 3166 code: NO-4639
- Website: Official website

Vik is a municipality in Vestland county, Norway. It is located on the southern shore of the Sognefjorden in the traditional district of Sogn. The administrative center of Vik Municipality is the village of Vikøyri. Other villages in the municipality include Feios, Fresvik, Arnafjord, and Vangsnes.

The 833.21-square-kilometre (321.70 sq mi) municipality is the 137th largest by area out of the 357 municipalities in Norway. Vik Municipality is the 250th most populous municipality in Norway with a population of 2,550. The municipality's population density is 3.1 inhabitants per square kilometre (8.0/sq mi) and its population has decreased by 5.1% over the previous 10-year period.

== General information ==
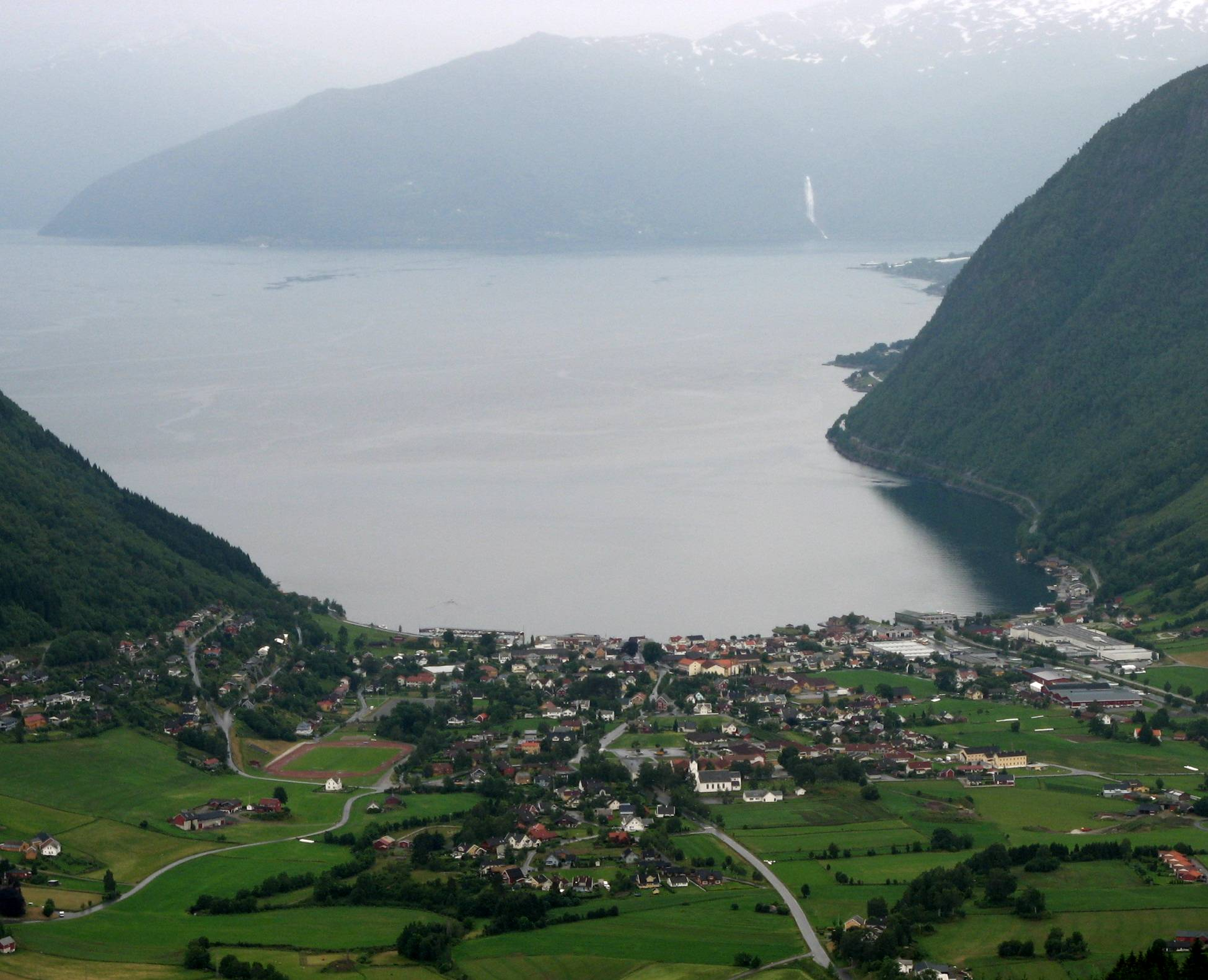
View of Vikøyri

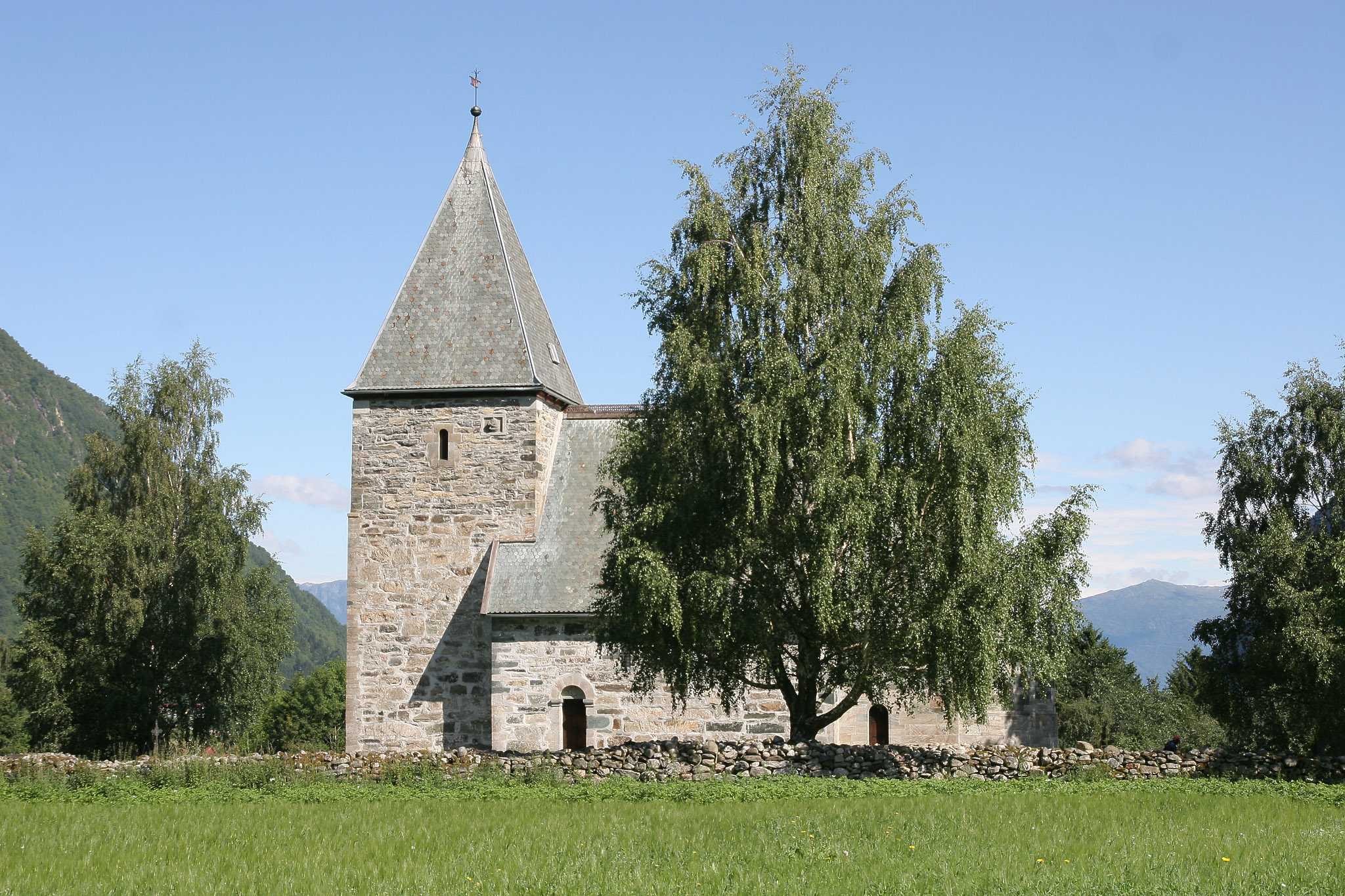
Stone church in Hove

The parish of Vik was established as a municipality on 1 January 1838 (see formannskapsdistrikt law). The original municipality was identical to the Church of Norway's Vik prestegjeld with the parishes (sokn) of Hopperstad, Hove, and Arnafjord (on the south side of the fjord) and Kvamsøy (on the north side of the fjord).

During the 1960s, there were many municipal mergers across Norway due to the work of the Schei Committee. On 1 January 1964 there was a land trade between three neighoring municipalities: the parish of Kvamsøy (population: 363) was transferred from Vik Municipality to Balestrand Municipality, the parish of Vangsnes (population: 189) was transferred from Balestrand Municipality to Vik Municipality, and the Nybø and Nygjerdet farms were transferred from Vik Municipality to Høyanger Municipality. After all these changes, Vik Municipality had a new total population of 2,623.

On 1 January 1992, the parishes of Feios and Fresvik were transferred from Leikanger Municipality to Vik Municipality. This added 572 residents to the population of Vik Municipality.

Historically, this municipality was part of the old Sogn og Fjordane county. On 1 January 2020, the municipality became a part of the newly-formed Vestland county (after Hordaland and Sogn og Fjordane counties were merged).

=== Name ===
The municipality (originally the parish) is named after the old village of Vik (Old Norse: Vík) since the first Vik Church was built there. The name is identical with the word vík which means "small bay", "cove", or "inlet", possibly referring to the small bay off the main Sognefjorden at the present-day village of Vikøyri.

=== Coat of arms ===
The coat of arms was granted on 15 March 1991. The official blazon is "Vert, three leaf-knives Or bendwise in pale" (Norwegian: På grøn grunn tre skråstilte gull lauvknivar). This means the arms have a green field (background) and the charge is a set of three knives for the cutting of leaves that are laying diagonally in a vertical column. The charge has a tincture of Or which means it is commonly colored yellow, but if it is made out of metal, then gold is used. These types of blunt point knives were commonly used in the area to cut fodder for animals. The arms were designed by Rune Tangstad. The municipal flag has the same design as the coat of arms.

=== Churches ===
The Church of Norway has five parishes (sokn) within Vik Municipality. It is part of the Sogn prosti (deanery) in the Diocese of Bjørgvin.

Churches in Vik Municipality
Parish (sokn)	Name	Location	Year built
Arnafjord	Arnafjord Church	Nese	1880
Feios	Feios Church	Feios	1866
Fresvik	Fresvik Church	Fresvik	1881
Vangsnes	Vangsnes Church	Vangsnes	1877
Vik	Vik Church	Vikøyri	1877
Vik	Hove Church	Vikøyri	c. 1170
Vik	Hopperstad Stave Church	Vikøyri	c. 1140

== Government ==
Vik Municipality is responsible for primary education (through 10th grade), outpatient health services, senior citizen services, welfare and other social services, zoning, economic development, and municipal roads and utilities. The municipality is governed by a municipal council of directly elected representatives. The mayor is indirectly elected by a vote of the municipal council. The municipality is under the jurisdiction of the Sogn og Fjordane District Court and the Gulating Court of Appeal.

=== Municipal council ===
The municipal council (Kommunestyre) of Vik Municipality is made up of 17 representatives that are elected to four-year terms. The tables below show the current and historical composition of the council by political party.

Vik kommunestyre 2023–2027
Party name (in Nynorsk)	Number of representatives
Labour Party (Arbeidarpartiet)	10
Conservative Party (Høgre)	2
Centre Party (Senterpartiet)	4
Socialist Left Party (Sosialistisk Venstreparti)	1
Total number of members:	17

Vik kommunestyre 2019–2023
Party name (in Nynorsk)	Number of representatives
Labour Party (Arbeidarpartiet)	8
Conservative Party (Høgre)	1
Centre Party (Senterpartiet)	7
Socialist Left Party (Sosialistisk Venstreparti)	1
Total number of members:	17

Vik kommunestyre 2015–2019
Party name (in Nynorsk)	Number of representatives
Labour Party (Arbeidarpartiet)	6
Conservative Party (Høgre)	2
Christian Democratic Party (Kristeleg Folkeparti)	1
Centre Party (Senterpartiet)	5
Liberal Party (Venstre)	3
Total number of members:	17

Vik kommunestyre 2011–2015
Party name (in Nynorsk)	Number of representatives
Labour Party (Arbeidarpartiet)	6
Conservative Party (Høgre)	2
Christian Democratic Party (Kristeleg Folkeparti)	1
Centre Party (Senterpartiet)	4
Liberal Party (Venstre)	4
Total number of members:	17

Vik kommunestyre 2007–2011
Party name (in Nynorsk)	Number of representatives
Labour Party (Arbeidarpartiet)	6
Progress Party (Framstegspartiet)	1
Conservative Party (Høgre)	1
Christian Democratic Party (Kristeleg Folkeparti)	1
Centre Party (Senterpartiet)	5
Socialist Left Party (Sosialistisk Venstreparti)	1
Liberal Party (Venstre)	2
Total number of members:	17

Vik kommunestyre 2003–2007
Party name (in Nynorsk)	Number of representatives
Labour Party (Arbeidarpartiet)	6
Progress Party (Framstegspartiet)	1
Conservative Party (Høgre)	1
Christian Democratic Party (Kristeleg Folkeparti)	1
Centre Party (Senterpartiet)	5
Socialist Left Party (Sosialistisk Venstreparti)	2
Liberal Party (Venstre)	1
Total number of members:	17

Vik kommunestyre 1999–2003
Party name (in Nynorsk)	Number of representatives
Labour Party (Arbeidarpartiet)	7
Conservative Party (Høgre)	2
Christian Democratic Party (Kristeleg Folkeparti)	2
Centre Party (Senterpartiet)	8
Socialist Left Party (Sosialistisk Venstreparti)	1
Liberal Party (Venstre)	1
Total number of members:	21

Vik kommunestyre 1995–1999
Party name (in Nynorsk)	Number of representatives
Labour Party (Arbeidarpartiet)	8
Conservative Party (Høgre)	2
Christian Democratic Party (Kristeleg Folkeparti)	1
Centre Party (Senterpartiet)	8
Socialist Left Party (Sosialistisk Venstreparti)	1
Liberal Party (Venstre)	1
Total number of members:	21

Vik kommunestyre 1991–1995
Party name (in Nynorsk)	Number of representatives
Labour Party (Arbeidarpartiet)	7
Conservative Party (Høgre)	3
Christian Democratic Party (Kristeleg Folkeparti)	1
Centre Party (Senterpartiet)	8
Socialist Left Party (Sosialistisk Venstreparti)	2
Total number of members:	21

Vik kommunestyre 1987–1991
Party name (in Nynorsk)	Number of representatives
Labour Party (Arbeidarpartiet)	8
Conservative Party (Høgre)	3
Christian Democratic Party (Kristeleg Folkeparti)	2
Centre Party (Senterpartiet)	8
Total number of members:	21

Vik kommunestyre 1983–1987
Party name (in Nynorsk)	Number of representatives
Labour Party (Arbeidarpartiet)	8
Conservative Party (Høgre)	4
Christian Democratic Party (Kristeleg Folkeparti)	2
Centre Party (Senterpartiet)	7
Total number of members:	21

Vik kommunestyre 1979–1983
Party name (in Nynorsk)	Number of representatives
Labour Party (Arbeidarpartiet)	6
Conservative Party (Høgre)	4
Christian Democratic Party (Kristeleg Folkeparti)	2
Centre Party (Senterpartiet)	8
Liberal Party (Venstre)	1
Total number of members:	21

Vik kommunestyre 1975–1979
Party name (in Nynorsk)	Number of representatives
Labour Party (Arbeidarpartiet)	6
Conservative Party (Høgre)	1
Christian Democratic Party (Kristeleg Folkeparti)	2
Centre Party (Senterpartiet)	11
Liberal Party (Venstre)	1
Total number of members:	21

Vik kommunestyre 1971–1975
Party name (in Nynorsk)	Number of representatives
Labour Party (Arbeidarpartiet)	6
Conservative Party (Høgre)	1
Christian Democratic Party (Kristeleg Folkeparti)	2
Centre Party (Senterpartiet)	10
Liberal Party (Venstre)	2
Total number of members:	21

Vik kommunestyre 1967–1971
Party name (in Nynorsk)	Number of representatives
Labour Party (Arbeidarpartiet)	6
Conservative Party (Høgre)	1
Christian Democratic Party (Kristeleg Folkeparti)	1
Centre Party (Senterpartiet)	9
Liberal Party (Venstre)	4
Total number of members:	21

Vik kommunestyre 1963–1967
Party name (in Nynorsk)	Number of representatives
Labour Party (Arbeidarpartiet)	5
Conservative Party (Høgre)	1
Christian Democratic Party (Kristeleg Folkeparti)	2
Centre Party (Senterpartiet)	9
Liberal Party (Venstre)	3
Local List(s) (Lokale lister)	1
Total number of members:	21

Vik heradsstyre 1959–1963
Party name (in Nynorsk)	Number of representatives
Labour Party (Arbeidarpartiet)	6
Conservative Party (Høgre)	1
Christian Democratic Party (Kristeleg Folkeparti)	3
Centre Party (Senterpartiet)	14
Liberal Party (Venstre)	5
Total number of members:	29

Vik heradsstyre 1955–1959
Party name (in Nynorsk)	Number of representatives
Labour Party (Arbeidarpartiet)	4
Conservative Party (Høgre)	1
Farmers' Party (Bondepartiet)	8
Liberal Party (Venstre)	2
Local List(s) (Lokale lister)	14
Total number of members:	29

Vik heradsstyre 1951–1955
Party name (in Nynorsk)	Number of representatives
Labour Party (Arbeidarpartiet)	7
Conservative Party (Høgre)	1
Farmers' Party (Bondepartiet)	10
Liberal Party (Venstre)	5
Joint List(s) of Non-Socialist Parties (Borgarlege Felleslister)	7
Local List(s) (Lokale lister)	6
Total number of members:	36

Vik heradsstyre 1947–1951
Party name (in Nynorsk)	Number of representatives
Labour Party (Arbeidarpartiet)	7
Conservative Party (Høgre)	1
Farmers' Party (Bondepartiet)	11
Liberal Party (Venstre)	2
List of workers, fishermen, and small farmholders (Arbeidarar, fiskarar, småbrukarar liste)	7
Local List(s) (Lokale lister)	8
Total number of members:	36

Vik heradsstyre 1945–1947
Party name (in Nynorsk)	Number of representatives
Labour Party (Arbeidarpartiet)	8
Conservative Party (Høgre)	1
Farmers' Party (Bondepartiet)	10
Liberal Party (Venstre)	3
Joint List(s) of Non-Socialist Parties (Borgarlege Felleslister)	6
Local List(s) (Lokale lister)	8
Total number of members:	36

Vik heradsstyre 1937–1941*
Party name (in Nynorsk)	Number of representatives
Labour Party (Arbeidarpartiet)	4
Conservative Party (Høgre)	3
Farmers' Party (Bondepartiet)	10
Liberal Party (Venstre)	3
Local List(s) (Lokale lister)	16
Total number of members:	36
Note: Due to the German occupation of Norway during World War II, no elections were held for new municipal councils until after the war ended in 1945.

=== Mayors ===
The mayor (Nynorsk: ordførar) of Vik Municipality is the political leader of the municipality and the chairperson of the municipal council. Here is a list of people who have held this position:

- 1838–1847: Christian Fredrik Fasting
- 1848–1849: Rev. Christian Severin Flinthoug Houge
- 1850–1854: Christian Fredrik Fasting
- 1855–1856: Rev. Christian Severin Flinthoug Houge
- 1857–1857: Peder A. Undi
- 1858–1861: Christian Christensen
- 1862–1863: Arnt Uchermann
- 1864–1864: Erik Brekke
- 1865–1865: Peder A. Undi
- 1866–1873: Christian Christensen
- 1874–1885: H.M. Meyer
- 1886–1897: Anfin Refsdal
- 1898–1898: Olav G. Tryti
- 1899–1901: Svein Aase
- 1902–1907: Anfin Refsdal
- 1908–1919: Nikolai Erdal
- 1920–1922: Ola R. Hoperstad
- 1923–1928: Anfin Refsdal
- 1929–1931: Jon Risløw
- 1932–1937: Arne Målsnes
- 1938–1940: Jon Risløw
- 1940–1945: Otto Svendsen
- 1946–1957: Lars O. Brekke
- 1958–1961: Olav Turvoll (Sp)
- 1961–1963: Ola A. Målsnes (Sp)
- 1965–1967: Lars Skeie (V)
- 1968–1973: Olav Turvoll (Sp)
- 1974–1987: Sjur Hopperstad (Sp)
- 1988–1991: Olav Turvoll (Sp)
- 1992–2003: Erling Stadheim (Ap)
- 2003–2007: Erik Lidal (Sp)
- 2007–2015: Marta Finden Halset (Ap)
- 2015–2019: Olav Turvoll (Sp)
- 2019–present: Roy Egil Stadheim (Ap)

== History ==
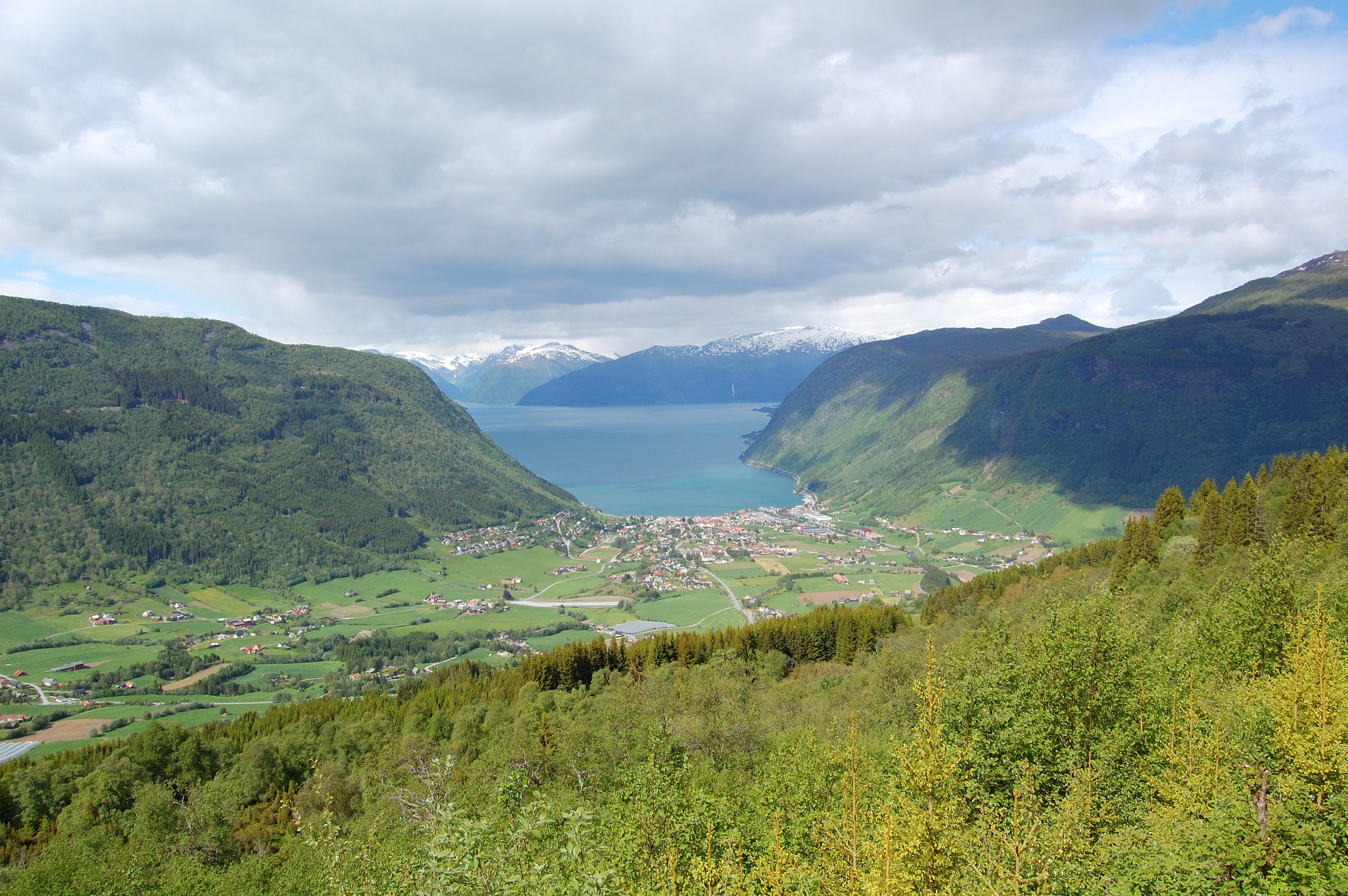
View of the Vikøyri valley

The wide and fertile village of Vikøyri was established in ancient times. The area must have stood out early as a good place to settle. Distinct parts of Norway stand out with many large burial mounds. These are areas that have been powerful and rich and must have been political centers in prehistoric times. Vik is such an area.

Vik was a center in Sogn through a great deal of the Bronze and Iron Ages (1800 BC-1050 AD). This is due to the importance of agriculture in Vik.

=== Viking Age ===
The farms in Vik lie on old marine terraces, and many of the burial mounds lie on the edges of these. Several of the mounds carried rich finds that show how the people of Vik traded and travelled both domestically and abroad. Especially the burial fields at Stadheim and Hove have given rich finds. The Hove mounds were built about 400-500 AD. At Hopperstad, finds have been made that prove Viking raids from Vik. These finds are bronze bowls and bronze dishes, things that probably found their way to Norway with the Viking raids.

Old Churches

In the latter half of the 12th century the Hopperstad Stave Church was built at Hopperstad and the stone Hove Church was built at Hove. Both churches are now renovated and restored and they are used by villagers and tourists. The Hove Church was privately owned and indicates that Hove was the home of citizens of great wealth.

In addition to these churches there was also a stave church at Tenål. This church was destroyed in a landslide, probably in the 16th century. This church might also have been built in the 12th century.

=== The Middle Ages ===
Until the 18th century life passed on for centuries without major changes, in Vik as in other parts of Norway. The Black Death swept over the country and lay farms waste. People lived from what the earth, the mountains, and the fjord gave them. Agriculture kept people alive, forestry has never had a central place in the Vik economy. Few people lived far from the fjord.

=== 18th century ===
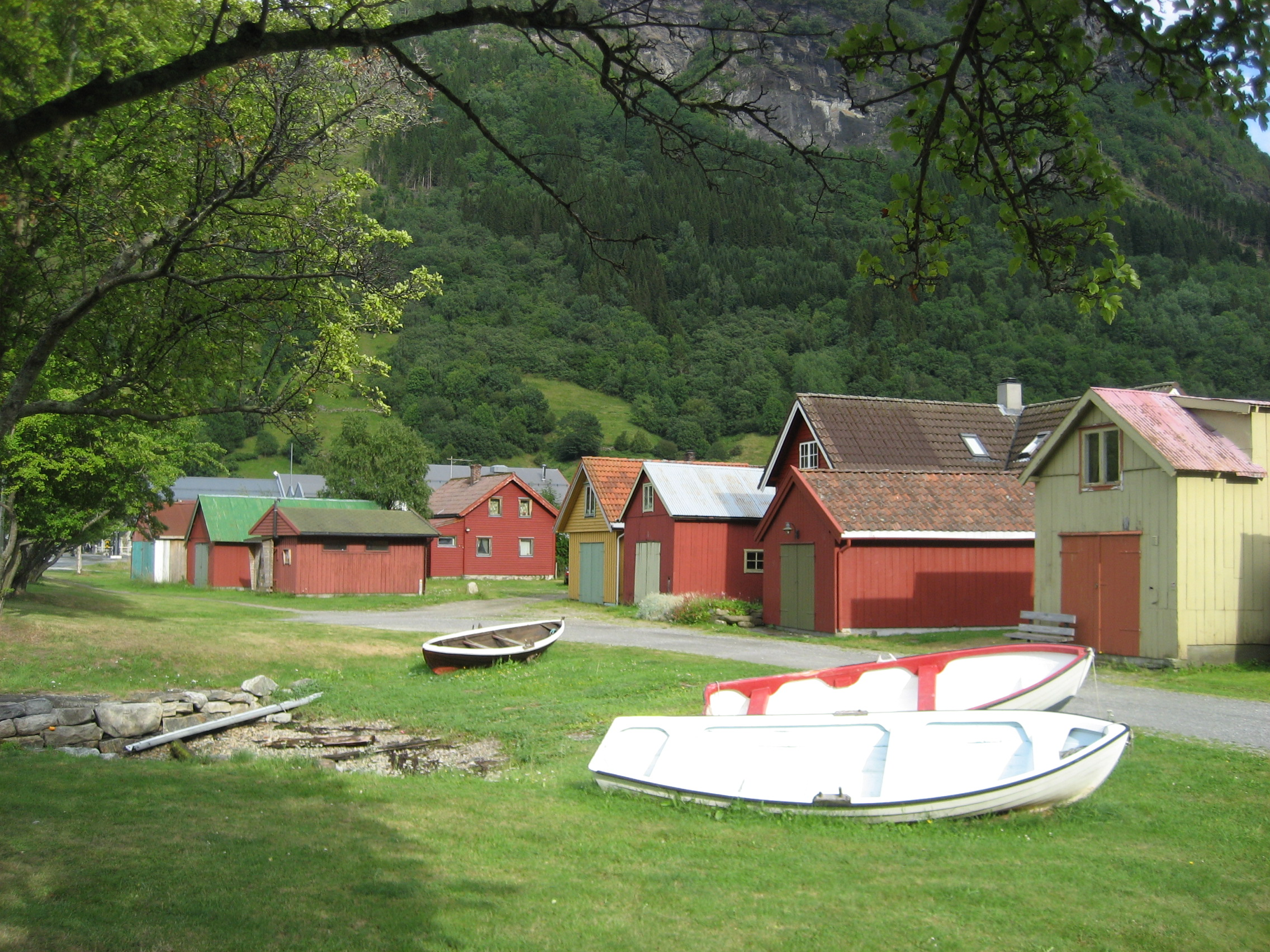
View of boathouses in Vik

In 1726, a military parade ground was established in Vik. This represents an important happening in the history of Vik. With the parade ground soldiers and officers found their way to Vik. When Vik became the drill ground for Sogns Bataljon in 1874, Vik's military days of glory began. The officers who came to Vik meant a lot for the development of the town. They were pioneers in agriculture and they were principal characters in politics. Other important happenings in the 18th century was the school building that was built already in 1741. The vicar Anders Daae built this house by his private means. This was one of the first school buildings in rural Norway. The house was torn down in the 1890s.

=== 19th century ===
On 2 December 1811, disaster struck Vik. The village of Nese, on the shore of the Arnafjorden, was devastated by a landslide and 45 people died. The farms at Nese were gathered in one house cluster where the landslide came down from the mountain. The situation worsened by the bad crops in 1812. Surviving cost a lot of hard work, and many people were in need of help. But eventually a way out was offered. In 1839. the first people from Vik emigrated to America. Per Ivarson Undi with his wife and children became the first emigrants from Sogn og Fjordane county. Over the years, many would follow. Over 4,000 people left from the area of present-day Vik municipality. In the year 2000 there are less than 3000 inhabitants left in Vik. Tens of thousands of Americans can trace their roots to Vik municipality.

The latter part of the 19th century saw villagers gathering in common organizations and clubs, and official organizations were established. A post office was established in 1844, Vik Sparebank in 1846 and an agricultural organization in 1858. Then followed a rifle club, a temperance society, a morality society, a choral society, a consumer union, a youth society and many others. People created new social meeting places. The extensive shifting of agricultural land resulted in better working and living conditions. In 1865, Vik Prison was built in Vikøyri (the only prison in Sogn og Fjordane county). The dairy plant was established in 1897. The dairy is the only one that produces gammelost (old cheese), and every year there is a Gammelost festival in Vik.

=== 20th century ===
Power Plant

In 1913, the first power plant in Vik was finished. When the plant was opened it was immoderately labeled "the greatest happening in the development of Vik". The Vik people looked optimistically upon the future of industry and economic growth. In 1920, Vik saw its first industry when Vik Trevarefabrikk (wood articles) and Vik Hermetikkfabrikk (canned products) were established. The Trevarefabrikk employed between 10 and 20 persons, and the Hermetikkfabrikk employed 60 persons from May through September. Both companies have since gone out of business.

Rv13 across Vikjafjellet

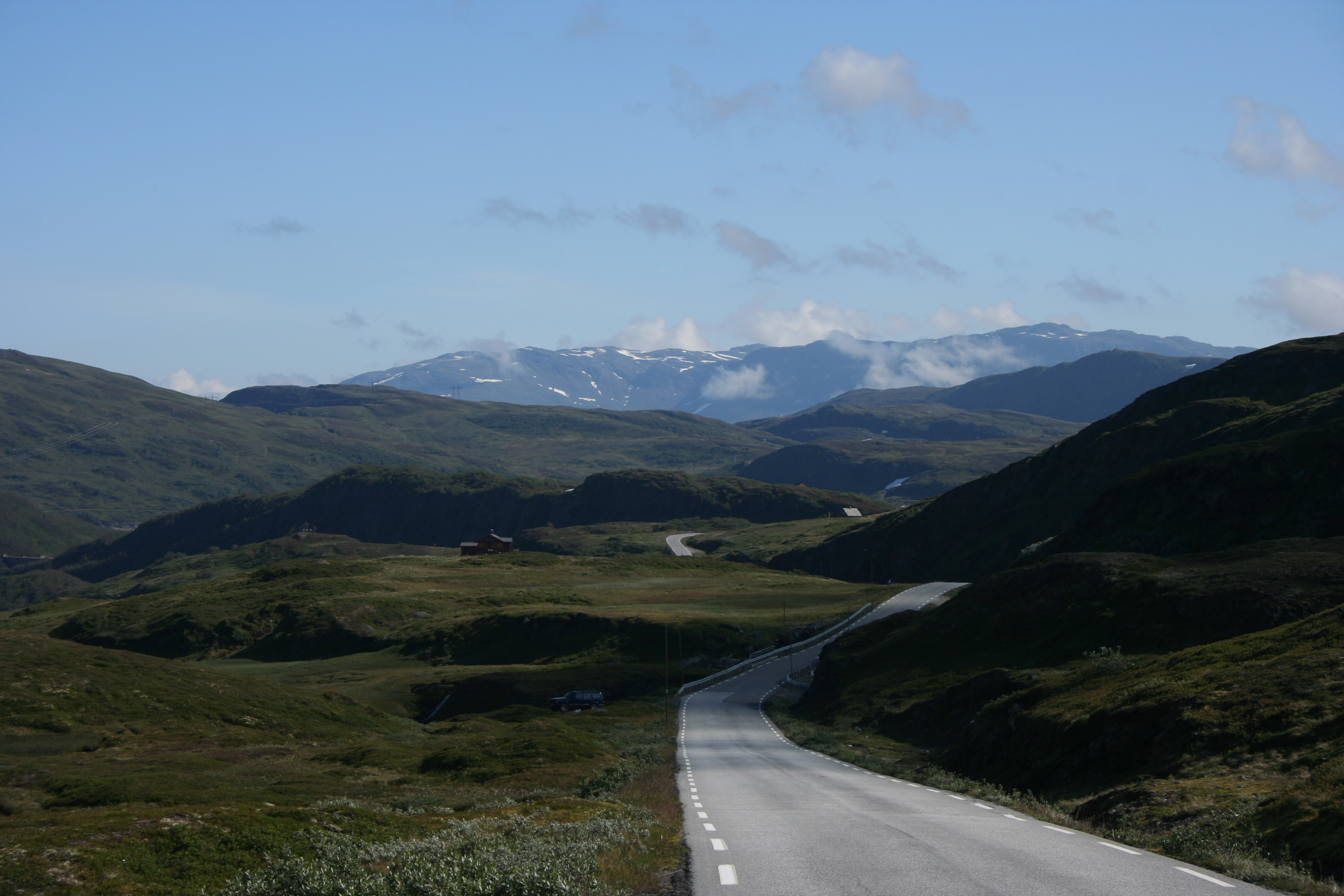
View of the road over Vikjafjellet

In 1957, the Norwegian National Road 13 between Vik Municipality and Voss Municipality (across the Vikjafjellet mountain) was officially opened. This was the first (and only) road connection to Vik from the rest of Norway, without any ferry or boat across the fjord. There are several regular ferry connections across the fjord.

Industry

From the late 1960s until 1990, agriculture in Vik was revolutionized. New land was cultivated and new farm buildings were built. When the last power project was finished, a great effort was made to establish new employment in Vik. The effort resulted in success, and Vik Verk opened in 1968. The company produced crash barriers, signposts, snow shields, and other aluminium products. About 220 persons were employed. Since then, the company has been split into several minor companies, and the total employment is a lot less today.

== Geography ==
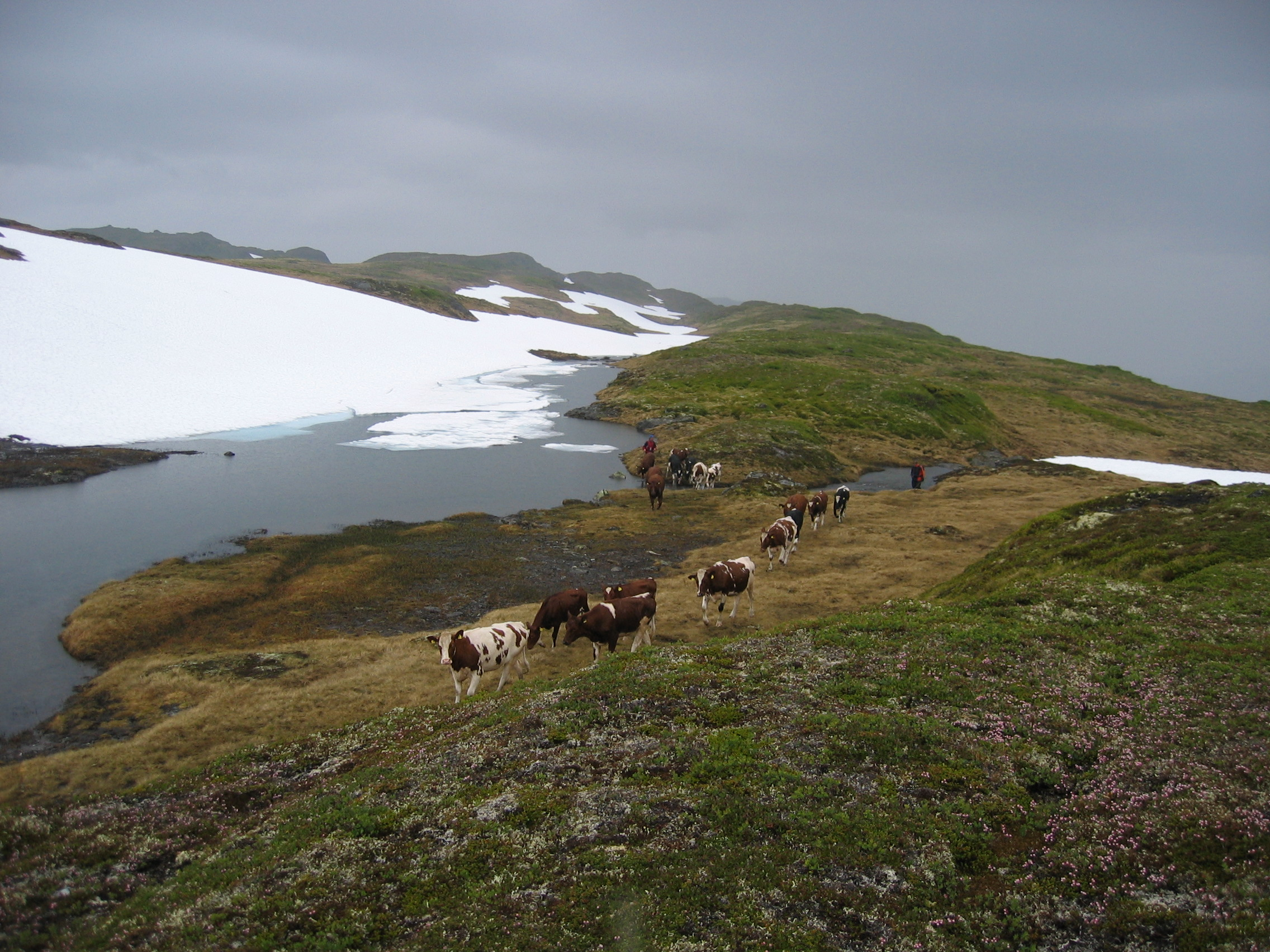
Moving cows to mountain pastures

Vik Municipality is located on the southern shores of the Sognefjorden and west of the Aurlandsfjorden. The municipality is bordered on the west by Høyanger Municipality and Modalen Municipality, to the south by Voss Municipality and Vaksdal Municipality, and to the east by Aurland Municipality. Across the Sognefjorden to the north and east lie Sogndal Municipality and Lærdal Municipality.

The lake Holskardvatnet is located in the southwest part of the municipality. The Fresvikbreen glacier is located between the villages of Fresvik and Vikøyri. The highest point in the municipality is the 1,640.14-metre (5,381.0 ft) tall mountain Rambera.

== Attractions ==
UNESCO World Heritage Site

The "West Norwegian Fjords of Geirangerfjord and Nærøyfjord" were added to UNESCO's World Heritage List in 2005. The two fjords are situated 120 kilometres (75 mi) from each other and they are separated by the Jostedalsbreen glacier. The World Heritage Site possesses a unique combination of glacial landforms at the same time as each area is characterised by its own outstanding beauty. The Nærøyfjord areas in this site stretch through the municipalities of Aurland, Lærdal, Vik, and Voss.

Vikøyri

The name Vikøyri describes the area between the rivers Vikja and Hopra. The last syllable of the name is the Norwegian word describing the flat area of land at the mouth of a river. The settlement lies on the Øyri, which was created by sediments deposited over thousands of years. Vikøyri was common land, owned by the local community, which might be the reason why the community grew so rapidly. During the 19th century an increasing number of people took up trade.

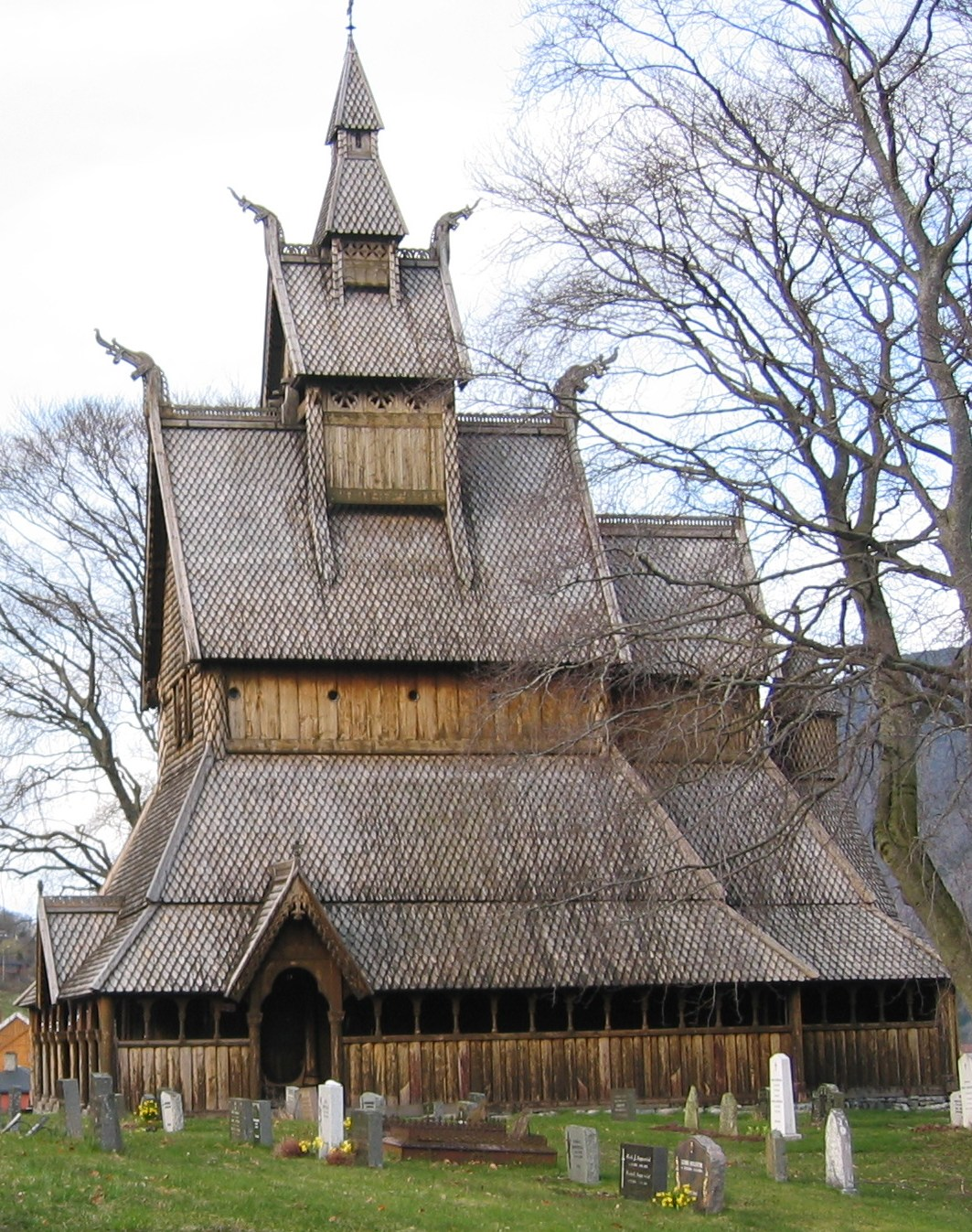
Hopperstad Stave Church in Vik in Sogn

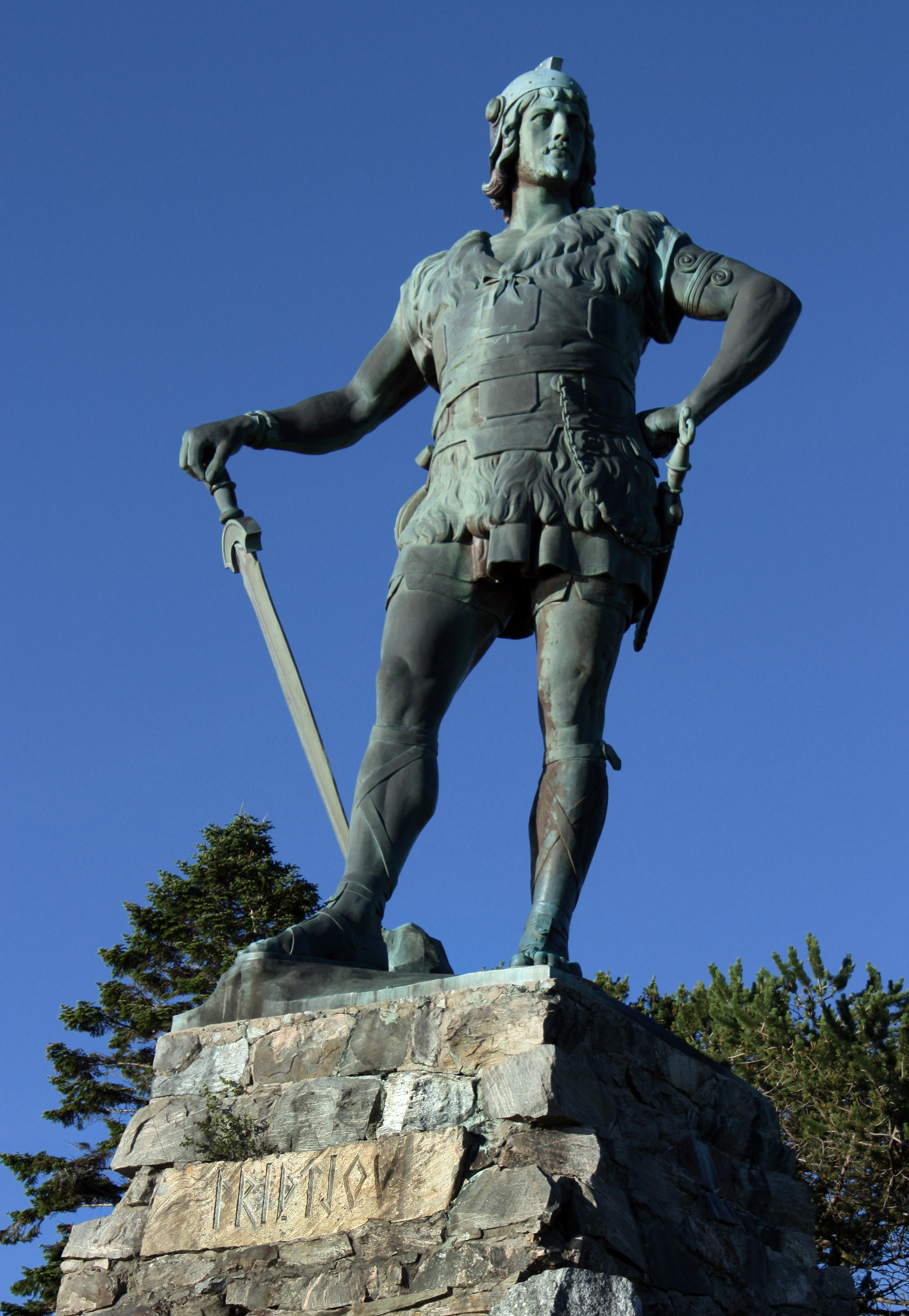
Statue of Fridtjof Max Unger (1913)

Hopperstad Stave Church

The Hopperstad Stave Church was built around 1130. It is a triple-nave stave church and has a Gothic altar-baldaquin with sculptured heads, as well as decorations and paintings in the ceiling depicting the childhood of Christ. This stave church was saved from demolition on the initiative of the architect Peter Andreas Blix.

The Stave churches are constructions of high quality, richly decorated with carvings. In virtually all of them the door frames are decorated from top to bottom with carvings. This tradition of rich ornamentation appears to go back to the animal carvings of the Viking Age. The dragons are lovingly executed and transformed into long-limbed creatures of fantasy, here and there entwined with tendrils of vine, with winding stems and serrated leaves. The elaborate designs are executed with supreme artistic skill. The stave church doorways are, therefore, among the most distinctive works of art to be found in Norway. However, it is difficult to connect them with the Christian gospel.

Statue of Fridtjof

The Statue of Fridtjof from Frithjof's Saga is a landmark which towers 22.5 metres (74 ft) over the hilltop. The statue was a gift from Kaiser Wilhelm II, to the Norwegian people and was erected in July 1913. It stands in a beautiful park overlooking the Sognefjorden at Vangsnes.

Borgstova

Borgstova is a house built in 1790. It is the only remnant of the Sjøtun Estate, which covered almost the entire village of Vikøyri. At Borgstova, there are copies of relics from the oldest burial sites in Vik.

Kristianhus Boat and Engine Collection

The museum is located by the fjord at the centre of Vikøyri in the same building as the tourist office. Here you can experience what historic boatlife was like for the inhabitants along the Sognefjord.

Vik Ski Festival

The Ski Festival is arranged at Vikafjellet (Vik Mountain) at the end of May. There are competitions in ski jumping, slalom skiing, cross-country skiing, and Telemark skiing. Public parties and cultural arrangements are organized in connection with the ski festival.

Birdlife

Situated on the Sognfjord, the municipality of Vik is known for its mild climate and vast scenery. On Vikafjellet, such animal species are present: the Eurasian golden plover, rodents, and the rough-legged buzzard. The woodlands hold the usual passerines depending if it is coniferous or deciduous. Along the fjords, the red-breasted merganser can be seen all year round while the call of the Eurasian oystercatcher can only be heard from spring through early autumn.

== Notable people ==
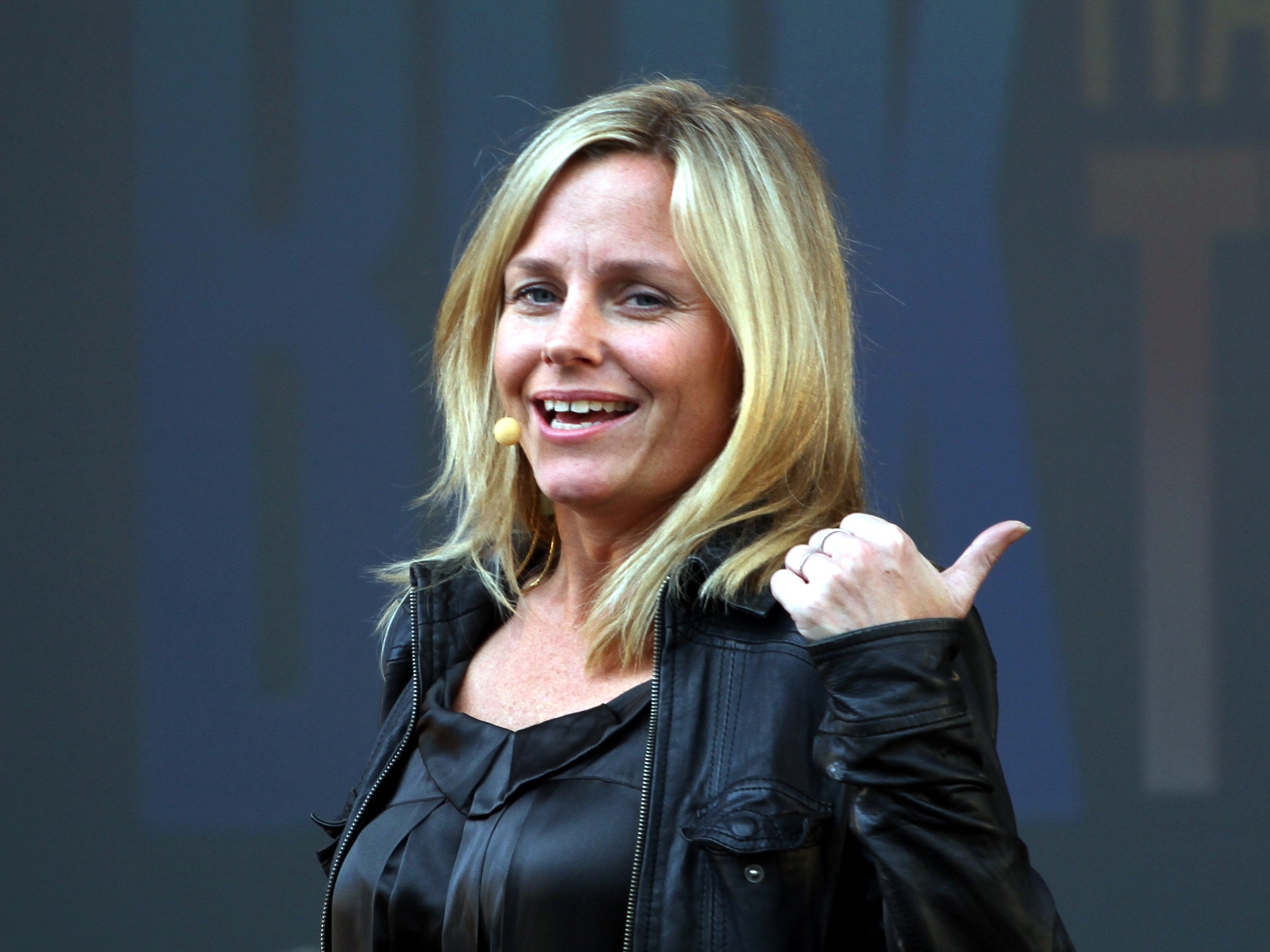
Solveig Kloppen, 2010

- Ludvig Daae (1723–1786), a priest and landowner
- Christen Christensen (1826–1900), a military officer, politician, and mayor of Vik in the 1850s & 1860s
- Edvard Liljedahl (1845–1924), a farmer, politician, and government minister
- Inga Houge (1856–1926), an actress
- Anders Nummedal (1867–1944), an archaeologist and academic who discovered the Fosna culture
- Sverre Riisnæs (1897-1988), a jurist, public prosecutor, and member of the Nasjonal Samling government
- Kåre Norvald Lerum (born 1939), a wealthy businessperson, politician, and mayor of Sogndal from 1978 to 1982
- Solveig Kloppen (born 1971), a journalist, actress, and TV hostess who grew up in Vik
- Gustav Valsvik (born 1993), a footballer with 250 club caps and 6 for Norway
