= Nese, Norway =

Village in Vik Municipality, Norway

Nese Arnafjord
- Village
- Interactive map of Nese; Arnafjord
- Location within Vestland Location within Norway
- Coordinates: 61.0226°N 6.38627°E
- Country: Norway
- Region: Western Norway
- County: Vestland
- District: Sogn
- Municipality: Vik Municipality
- Elevation: 18 m (59 ft)
- Time zone: UTC+01:00 (CET)
  - Summer (DST): UTC+02:00 (CEST)
- Post Code: 6893 Vik i Sogn

Nese or Arnafjord is a village in Vik Municipality in Vestland county, Norway. The village is located on the shore of the inner part of the Arnafjorden in the eastern part of the municipality. This is the site of Arnafjord Church, where there has been a church since the 1600s. This village was historically the main village around this fjord, with a shop, post office, and steamship stop. Today the population has declined to that of a very small village.

Nese/Arnafjord sits about 25 kilometres (16 mi) southwest of the village of Vikøyri, at the end of the road. There is only one road that leads to the village, and the village is at the end of that road. There are no other roads leading further west in the municipality. The next village to the west is Ortnevik in Høyanger Municipality about 16 kilometres (9.9 mi) away. Since there is no direct road connection from Nese to Ortnevik, one would have to drive 37 kilometres (23 mi) northeast, cross the Sognefjorden by ferry, drive another 60 kilometres (37 mi) west, cross the Sognefjorden by ferry, and then get off the ferry at Ortnevik—a grand total of about 115 kilometres (71 mi).

== History ==
On the night of 2 December 1811, there was a large rock slide from the mountain immediately west of Nese, which sent large rocks and boulders falling and rolling right through the small village, and killing 45 people (out of the 60 or so that were living there). Most of the bodies were swept into the fjord and never recovered.
