= Hopperstad Stave Church =

Church in Vestland, Norway

- Hopperstad stavkyrkje
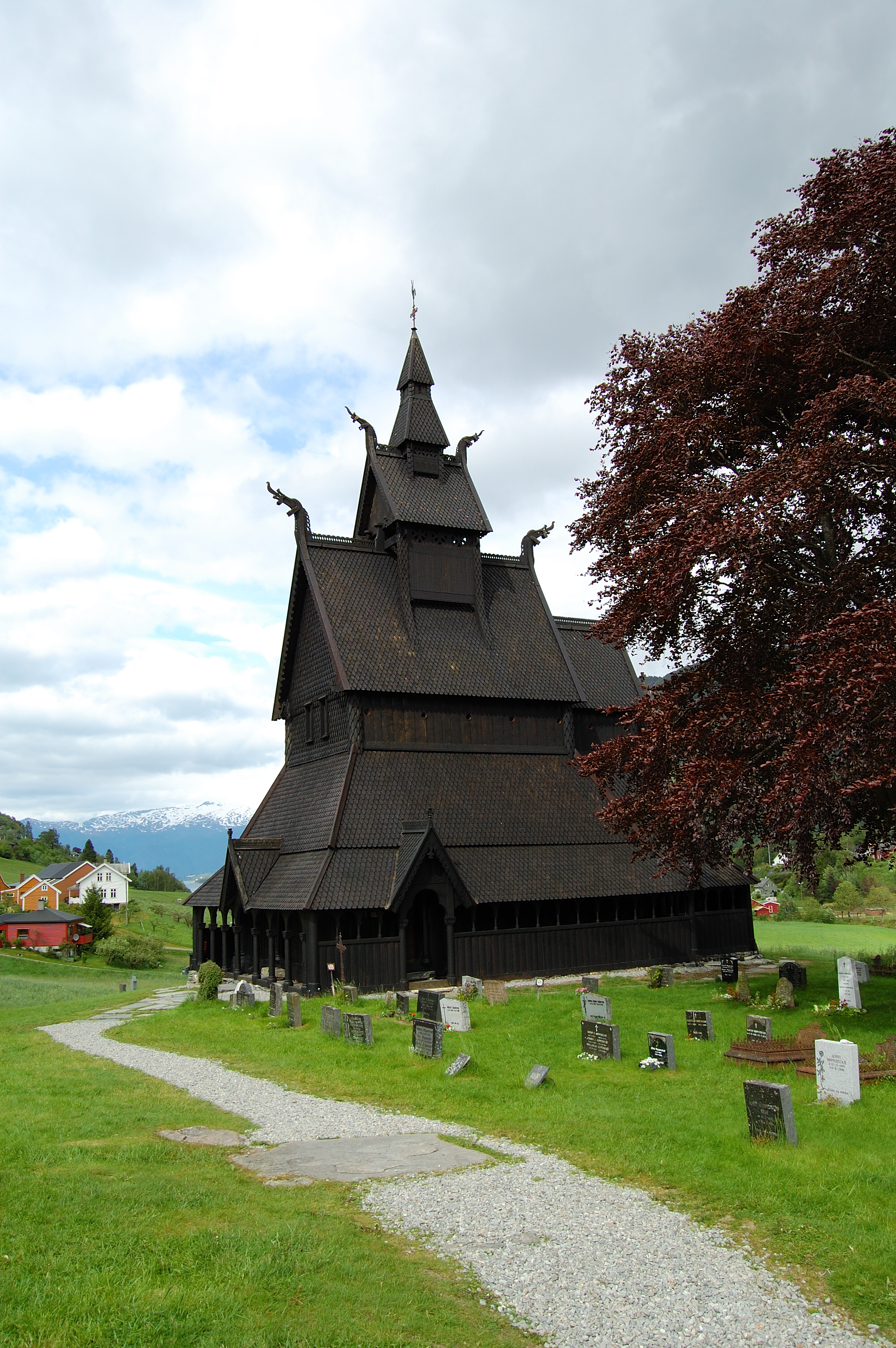
- View of the church
- Hopperstad Stave Church
- 61°04′39″N 6°34′08″E
- Location: Vik Municipality, Vestland
- Country: Norway
- Denomination: Church of Norway
- Previous denomination: Catholic Church
- Churchmanship: Evangelical Lutheran

History
- Status: Parish church (former)
- Founded: 12th century
- Consecrated: c. 1130

Architecture
- Functional status: Preserved
- Architect: Unknown (19th-century restoration: Peter Andreas Blix)
- Architectural type: Long church / Stave church
- Style: Romanesque and Gothic
- Completed: c. 1130 (896 years ago)
- Closed: 1877

Specifications
- Capacity: 30
- Materials: Wood

Administration
- Diocese: Bjørgvin bispedømme
- Deanery: Sogn prosti
- Parish: Vik
- Norwegian Cultural Heritage Site
- Type: Church
- Status: Automatically protected
- ID: 84627

Hopperstad Stave Church (Norwegian: Hopperstad stavkyrkje) is a historic parish church of the Church of Norway in the village of Vikøyri in Vik Municipality in Vestland county. It was historically the church for the Hopperstad parish in the Diocese of Bjørgvin. The brown, wooden stave church was built during the 12th century. The church seats about 30 people.

The stave church is assumed to have been built around the year 1130 and still stands at its original location. The church is one of the oldest stave churches still standing in Norway. The church is currently owned by the Society for the Preservation of Ancient Norwegian Monuments.

There is a replica of the Hopperstad Stave Church at the Heritage Hjemkomst Center in the city of Moorhead in the state of Minnesota in the United States. It was dedicated in 1998. The replica church is part of a larger complex that includes a museum and Scandinavian heritage center.

== History ==
The earliest existing historical records of the church date back to the year 1322, but the church was not new that year. The first church at Hopperstad was likely a small, wooden stave church that was built during the mid-11th century, possibly around the year 1060. This church was torn down and replaced with the present church during the early- to mid-12th century, possibly between the years 1130 and 1150. In 1982, archaeological evidence was found showing post holes for the large staves that support the idea of a previous church on the site. Again in 1997, a series of samples from the logs were collected for dendrochronological dating of the church. A total of seven samples produced an estimate for the construction ranging from 1034 to 1116 and resulted in no definite conclusion in the age of the church, however, this supports the idea that the materials from the old church were used in the construction of the present church.

The medieval timbers of the church bear a significant number of graffiti, carved in runes.

No records exist as to what the medieval church actually looked like. There are a variety of sketches showing a nave and chancel. The church did not undergo any major changes until the 1600s. At that time the nave was lengthened to the west, and a bell-tower was added above the new extension. To the east, a new section was added and built out of logs. A new vestibule to the south with its own entrance was also added. In 1723, the church was sold into private ownership at the Norwegian church auction so the King could pay off debts from the Great Northern War.

The largest addition to the church came to the north with a log construction. This new part was named the "new church" (nykirken). The construction was finished during the 1700s (this area was torn down in around 1875). There are no known images of the interior from this time, but a story written by the priest Niels Dahl, who is assumed to have visited the church in 1824, describes the interior:

The church has galleries at three levels around all of the walls, that the church [had a rundt alle veggene og at den var lavloftet og tømret] with staircases up to the galleries. And the font is placed under the medieval baldaquin. And the walls are painted by numerous quotes from the Holy Scripture in vivid colours.

In 1814, this church served as an election church (Norwegian: valgkirke). Together with more than 300 other parish churches across Norway, it was a polling station for elections to the 1814 Norwegian Constituent Assembly which wrote the Constitution of Norway. This was Norway's first national elections. Each church parish was a constituency that elected people called "electors" who later met together in each county to elect the representatives for the assembly that was to meet at Eidsvoll Manor later that year.

In the 1870s, the two neighboring Hove Church and Hopperstad Stave Church parishes were both in need of new churches. The issue was first raised by the local parish priest Jørgen Christian Andreas Grøner who complained about the size of the two churches. Both churches were old and small and due to their age, they were in dire need of improvements. The local villagers believed he was exaggerating and the private owners of the church did not want to spend money on the churches. Soon after, the local priest decided to no longer hold services at the Hopperstad Stave Church since it was so cold and drafty. Within a short period of time, it was decided to merge the two neighboring parishes into one larger parish. On 11 December 1875, a royal decree was issued that ordered the closure of both churches and the construction of a new church in Vikøyri for the newly created parish. In 1877, the new Vik Church was constructed and the two older churches were taken out of regular use and preserved as historical sites.

In 1877, after about 700 years in use, the old church was abandoned. The church had been in very poor condition for many years and three years after its closure, the Society for the Preservation of Ancient Norwegian Monuments purchased the building in 1880. All of the "new" additions were torn down, leaving just the medieval building still standing. Using the Borgund Stave Church as a model, architect Peter Andreas Blix reconstructed the church between 1884 and 1891. During the reconstruction, carved sections were found beneath the floor which indicated that the new church replaced an older church, which was probably built in the latter half of the 11th century. During the reconstruction, the nave and choir were left alone and the apse, corridors, and roof were all rebuilt. All of the newly rebuilt areas were based on similar existing stave churches such as the Borgund Stave Church and the Urnes Stave Church. Since its completion in 1891, the church has been used primarily as a museum, although the parish will still use the church for special occasions.

== Present building ==
The church is a triple-nave stave church of what is known as the Borgund-type. It has three portals, and the western portal is an excellent example of Middle Age wood carving. The motifs are of a romance character, often associated with European influence. The nave is a raised central room with an aisle around it, and the choir is apsidal and narrower than the nave.

The church contains an altar dedicated to the Virgin Mary, and 14th-century ciborium with a baldachin on the north side. The ciborium has four sculptured heads, that of Christ with a halo, a queen, a king, and a monk. The roof of the baldachin bears a painting of the birth of Christ.

== Media gallery ==
Exterior

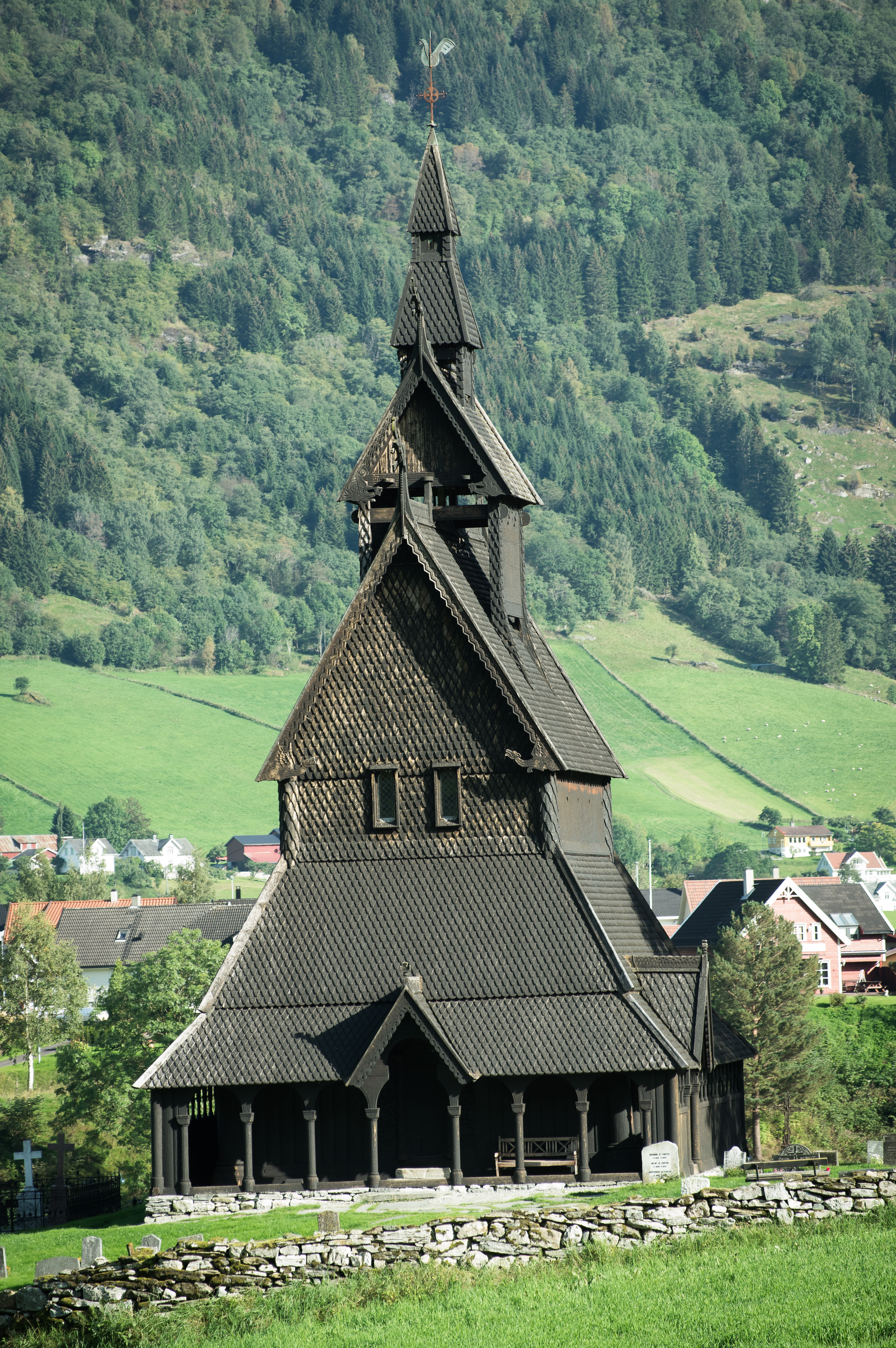
Main entrance

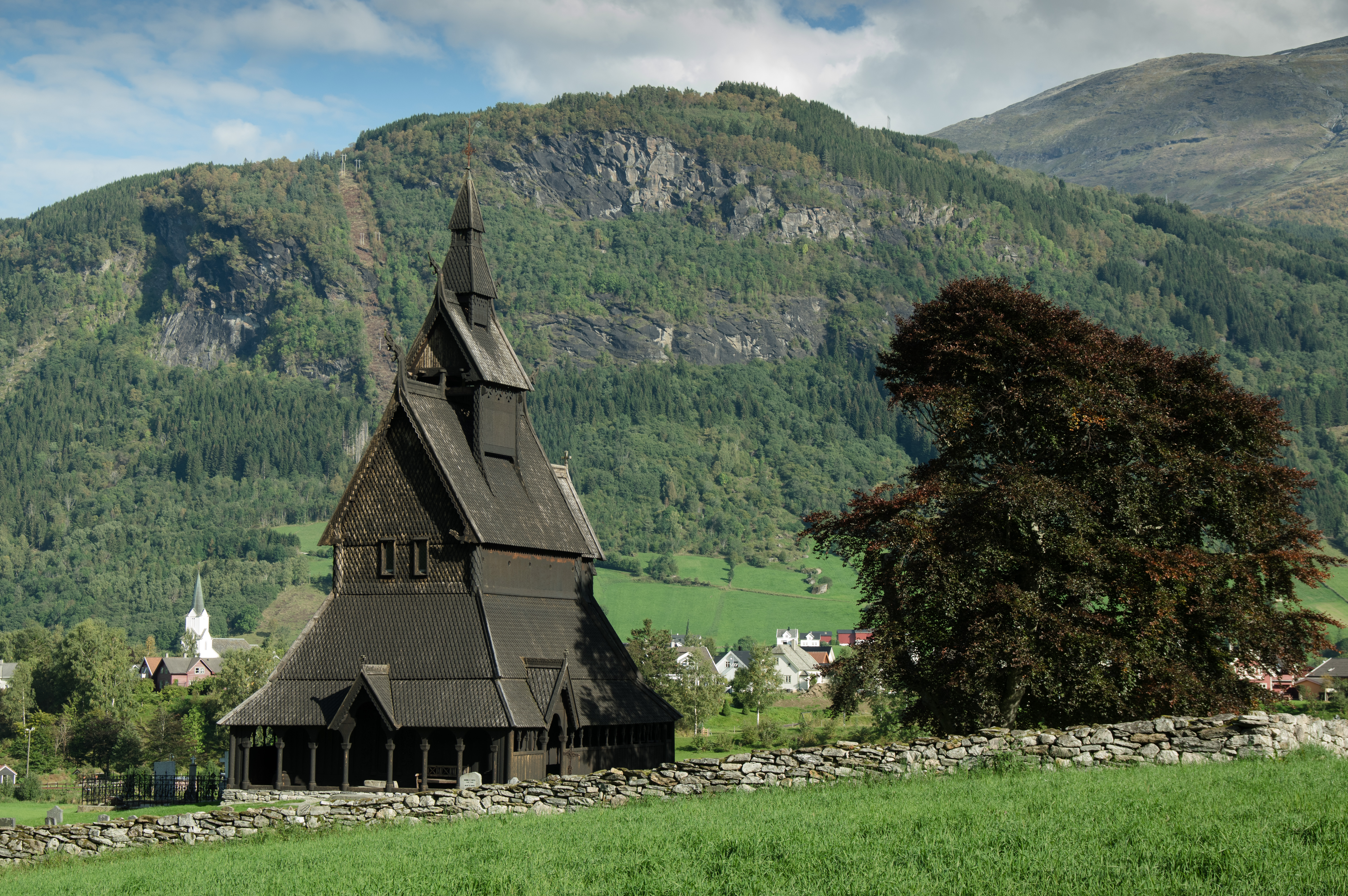
Church exterior (2016)

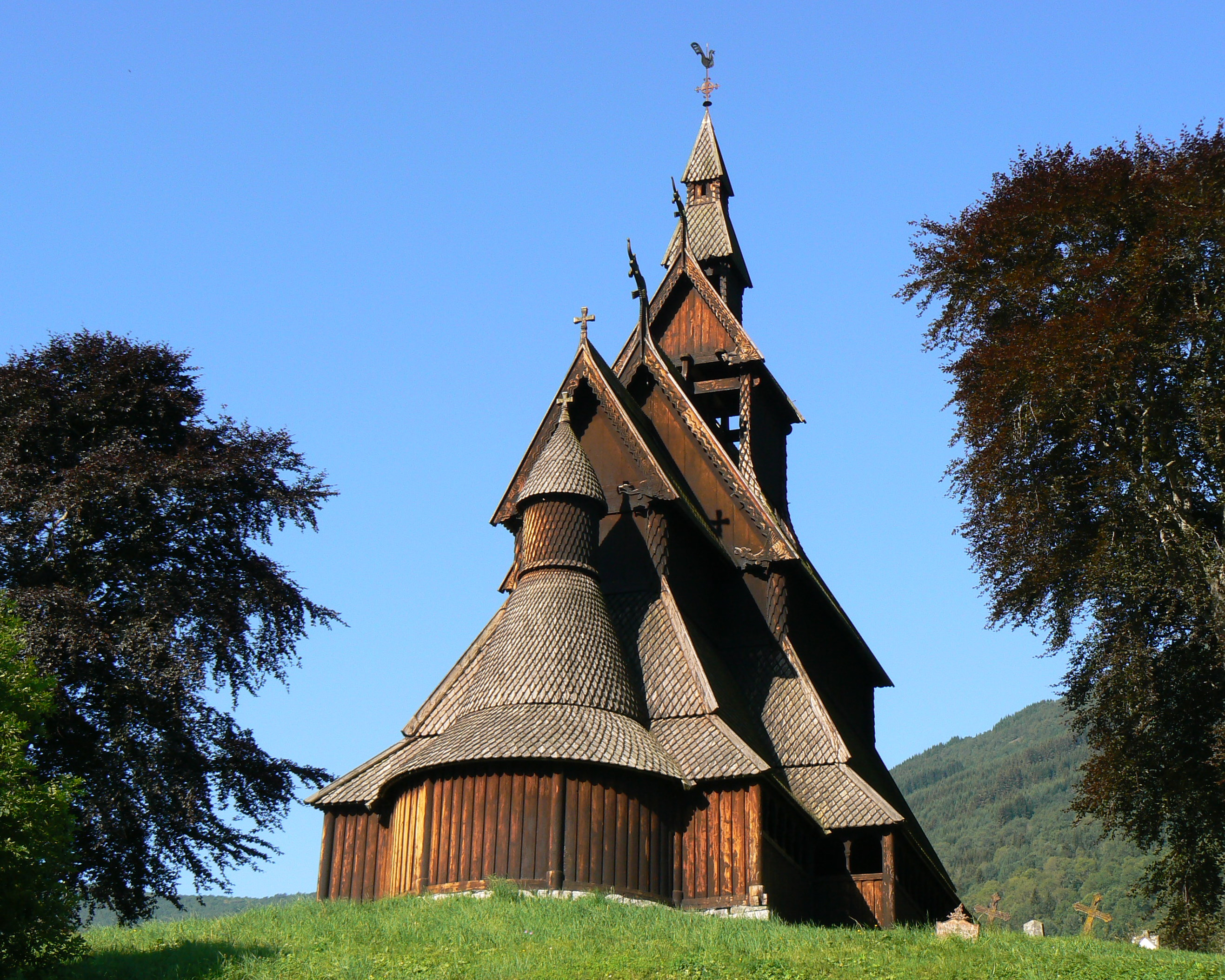
View from the east

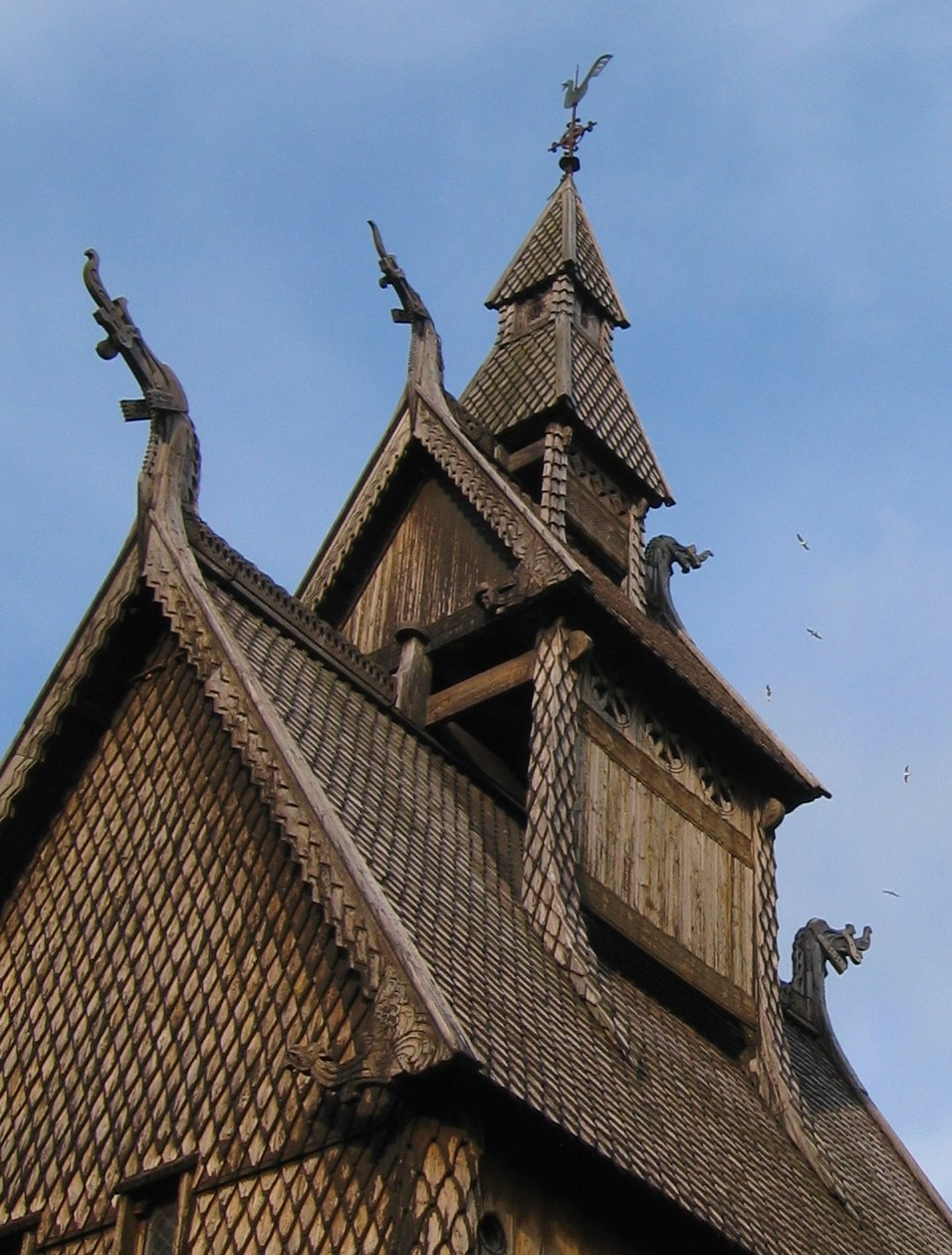
Hopperstad stave church

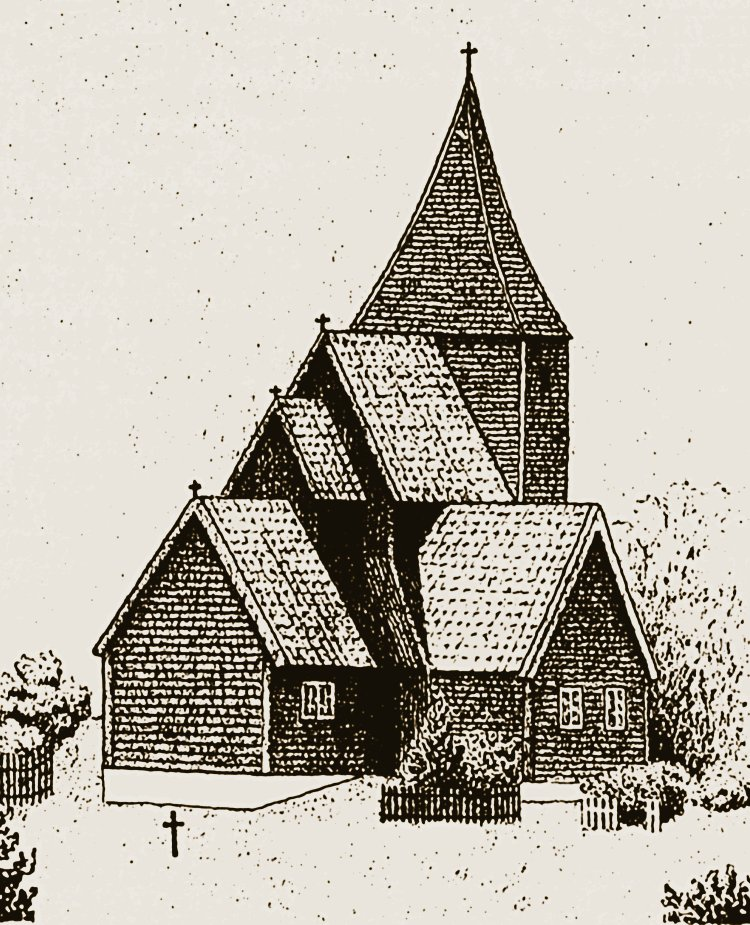
Drawing of Hopperstad stave church from 1878

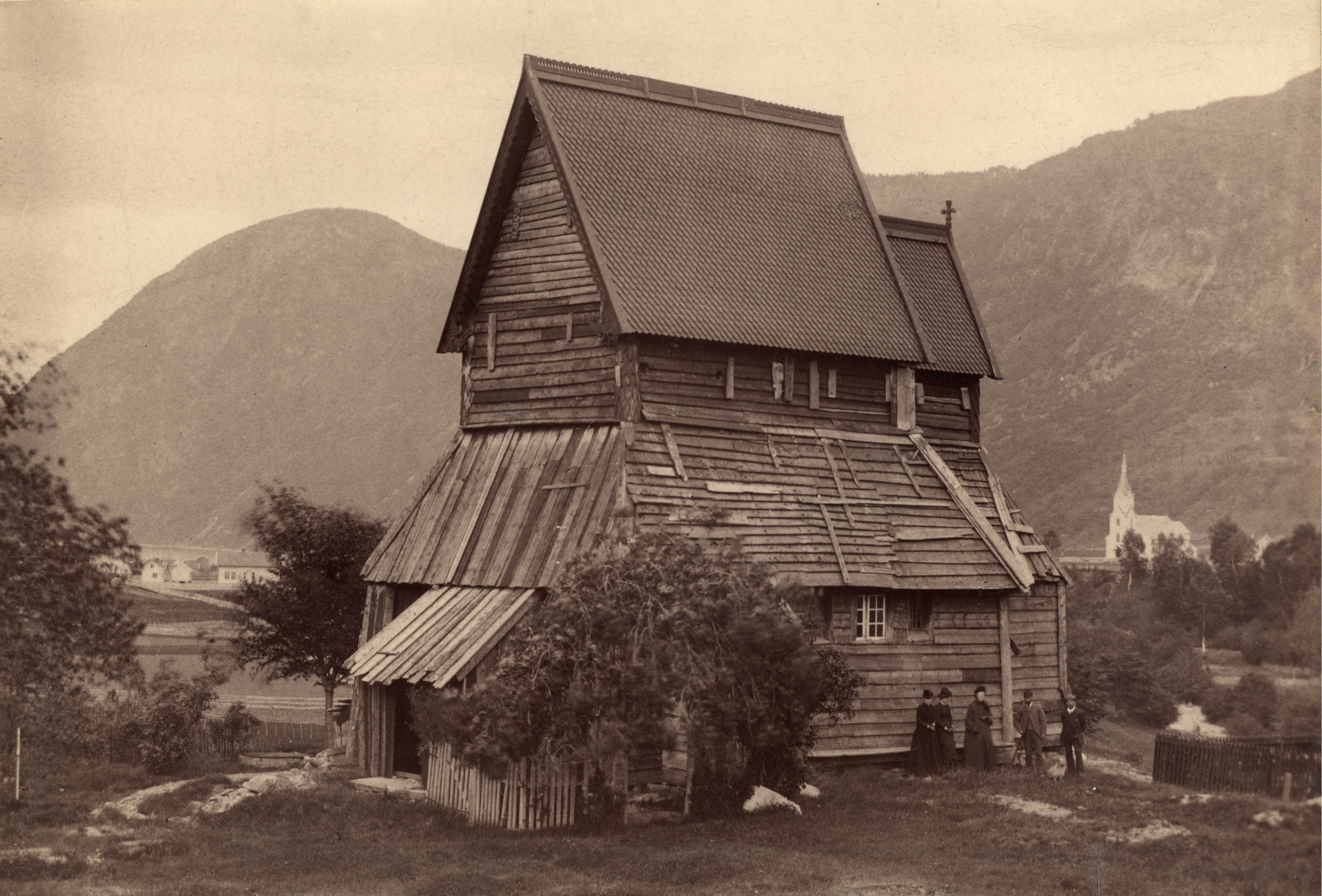
Hopperstad in 1885 before restoration work

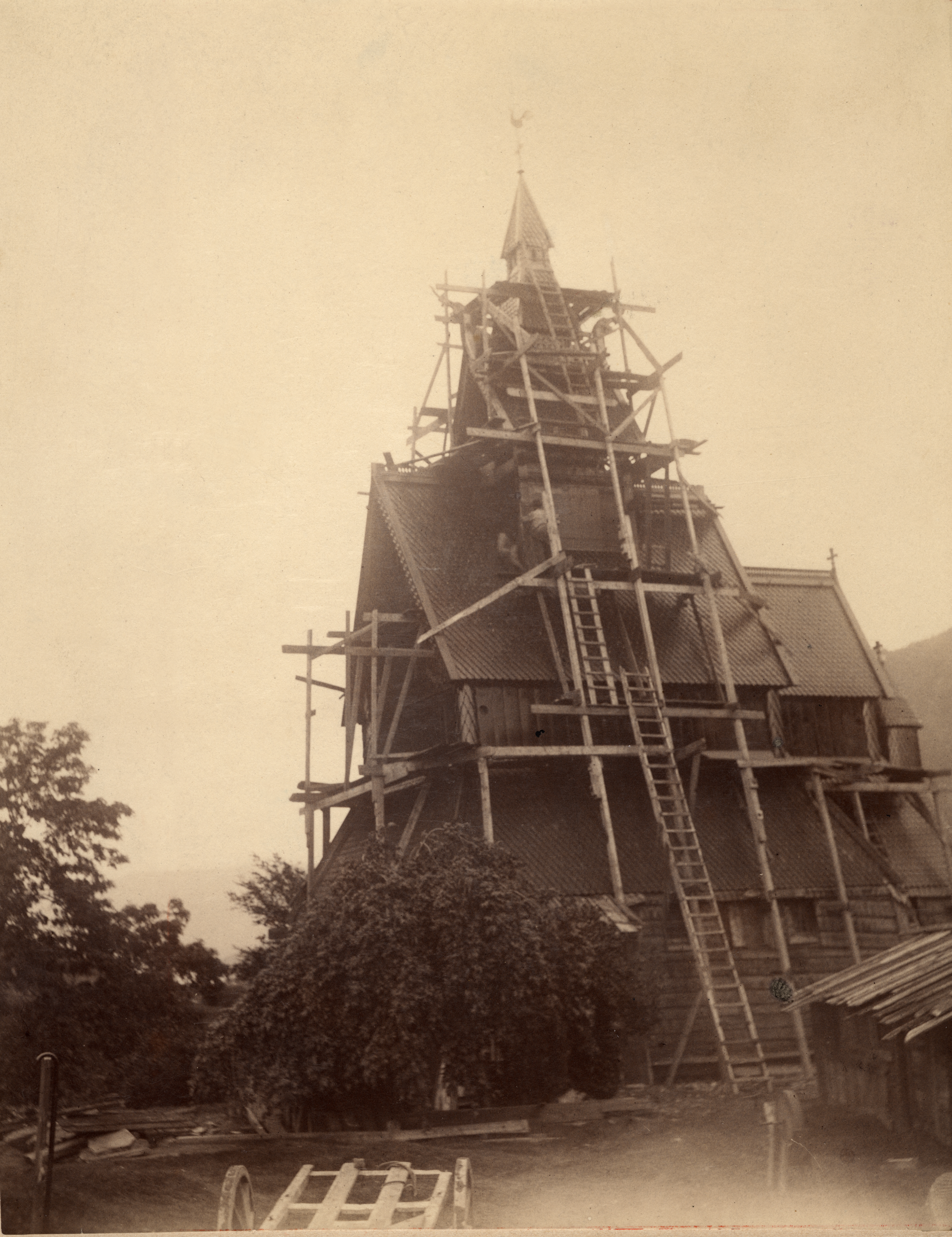
View of the church during the restoration work

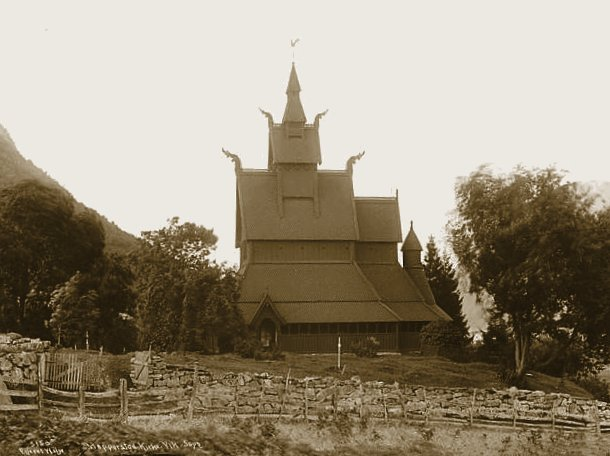
The church after the restoration

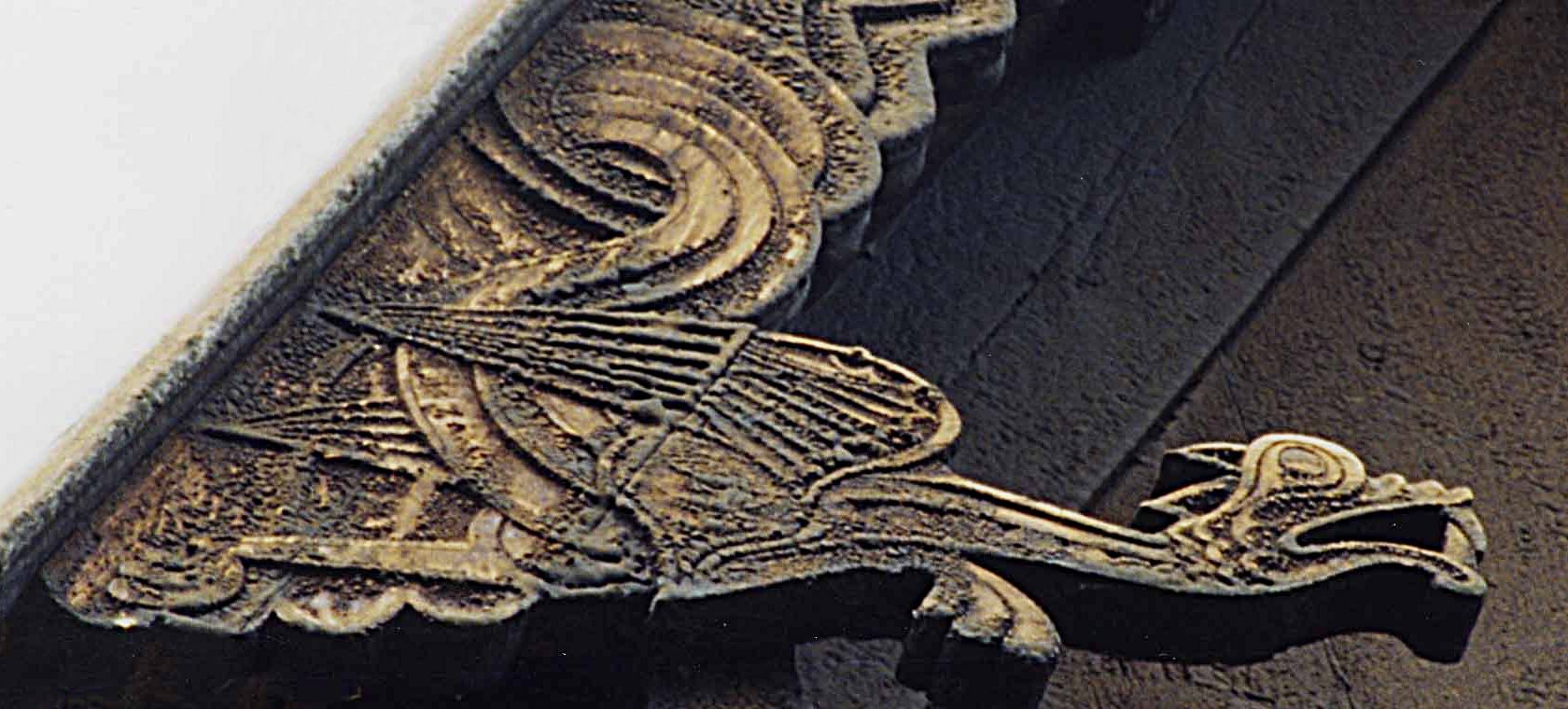
Dragon head

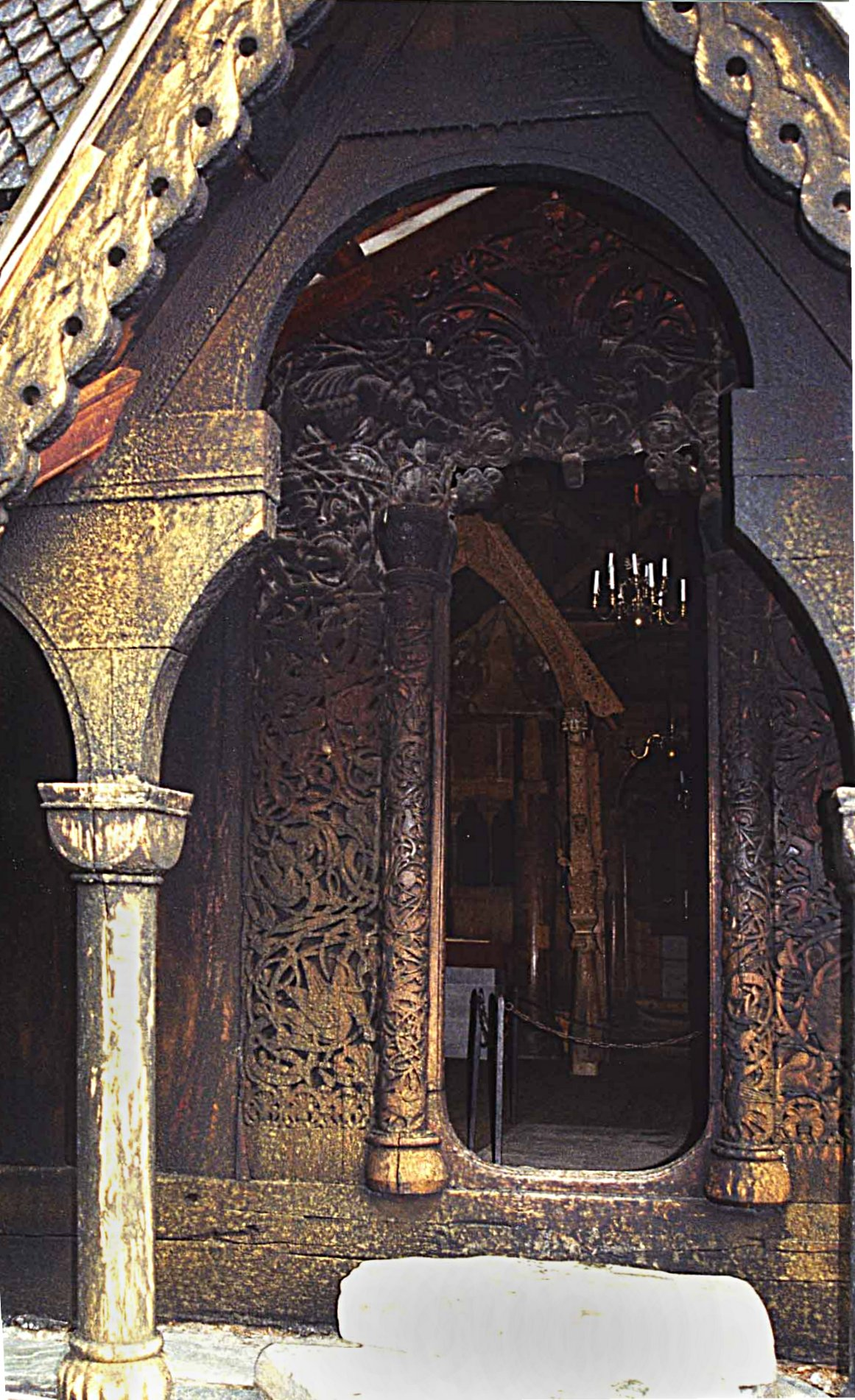
Portal
Interior

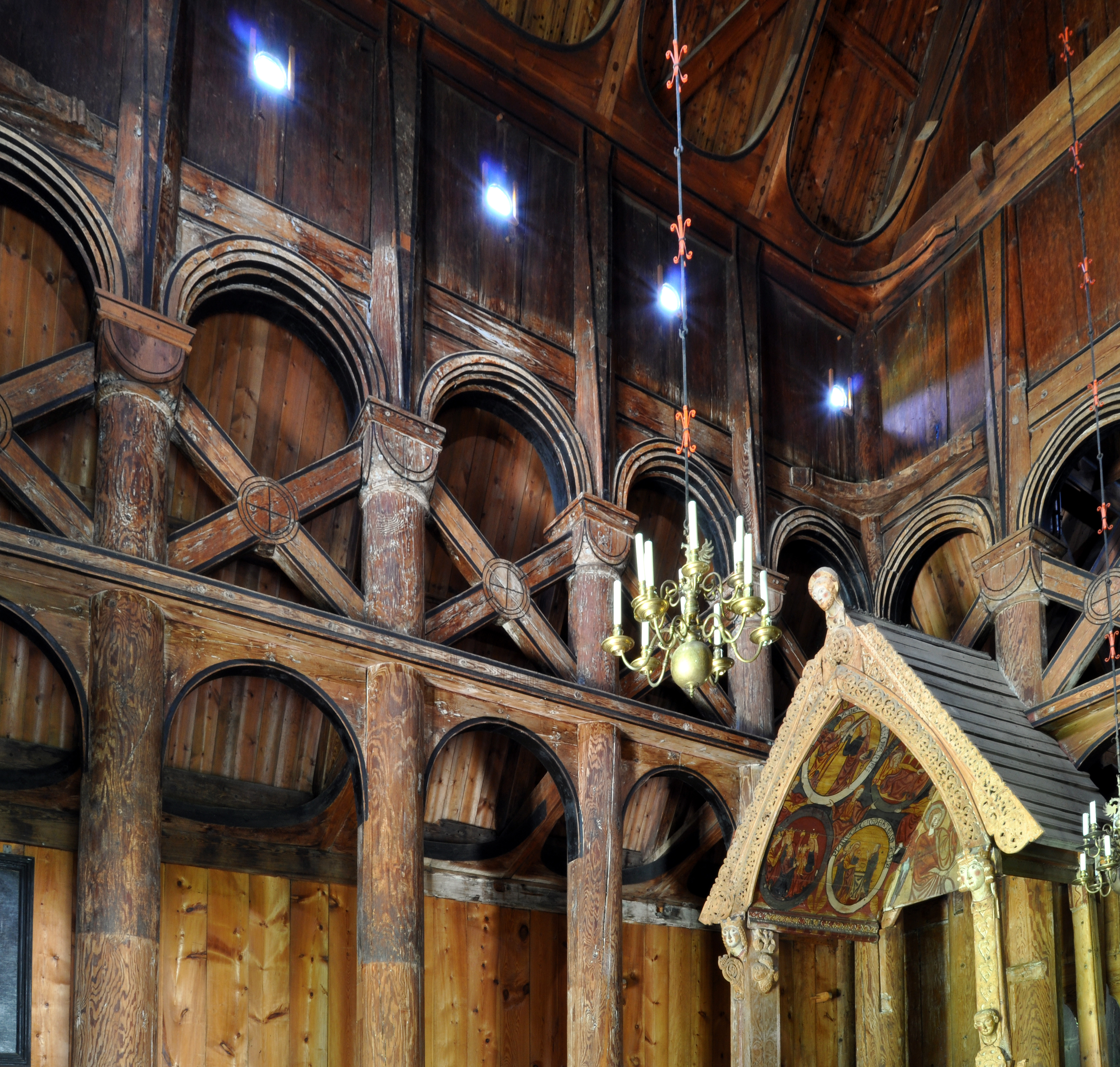
View of interior with cimborium

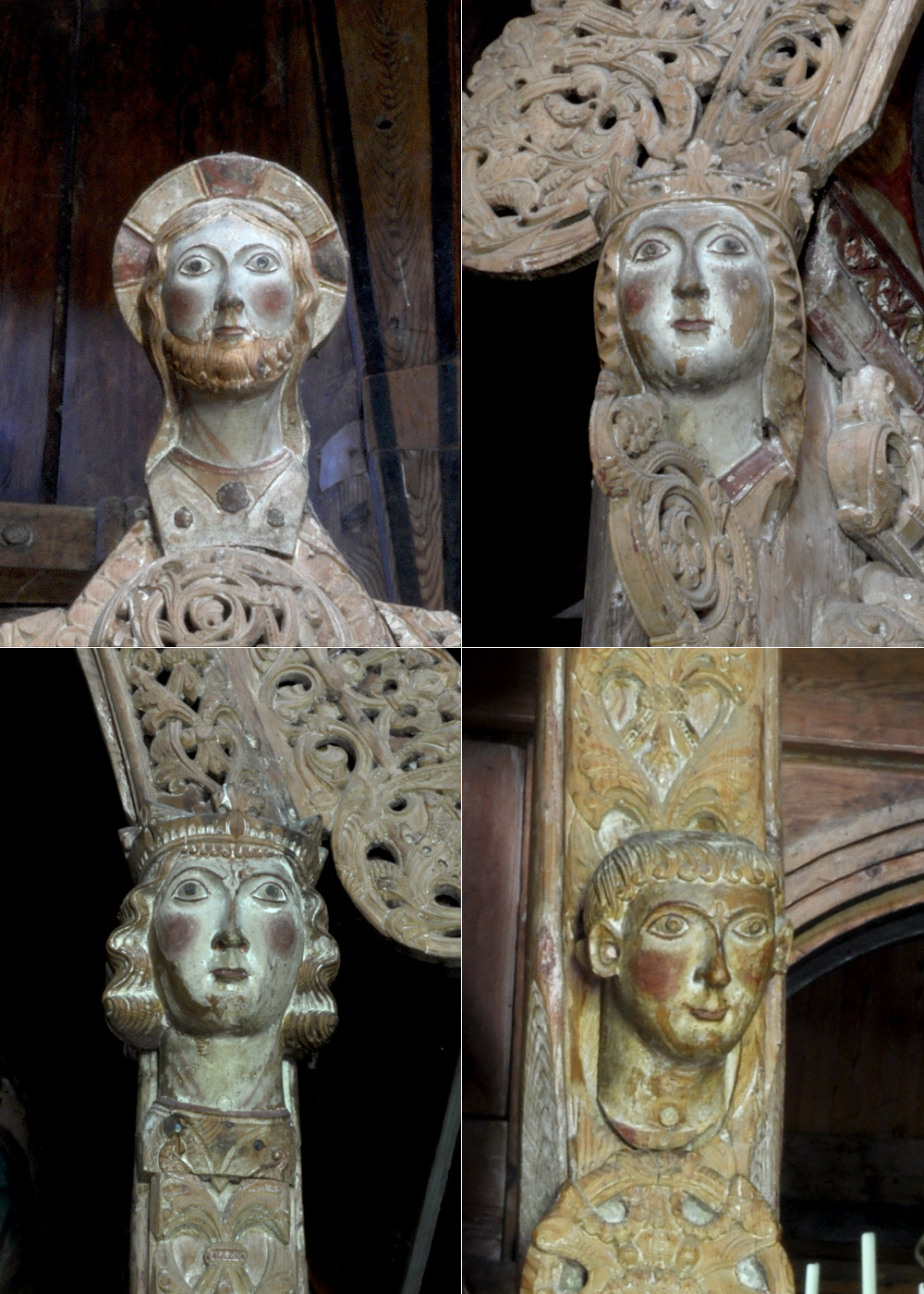
Heads of baldachin in stave church Hopperstad

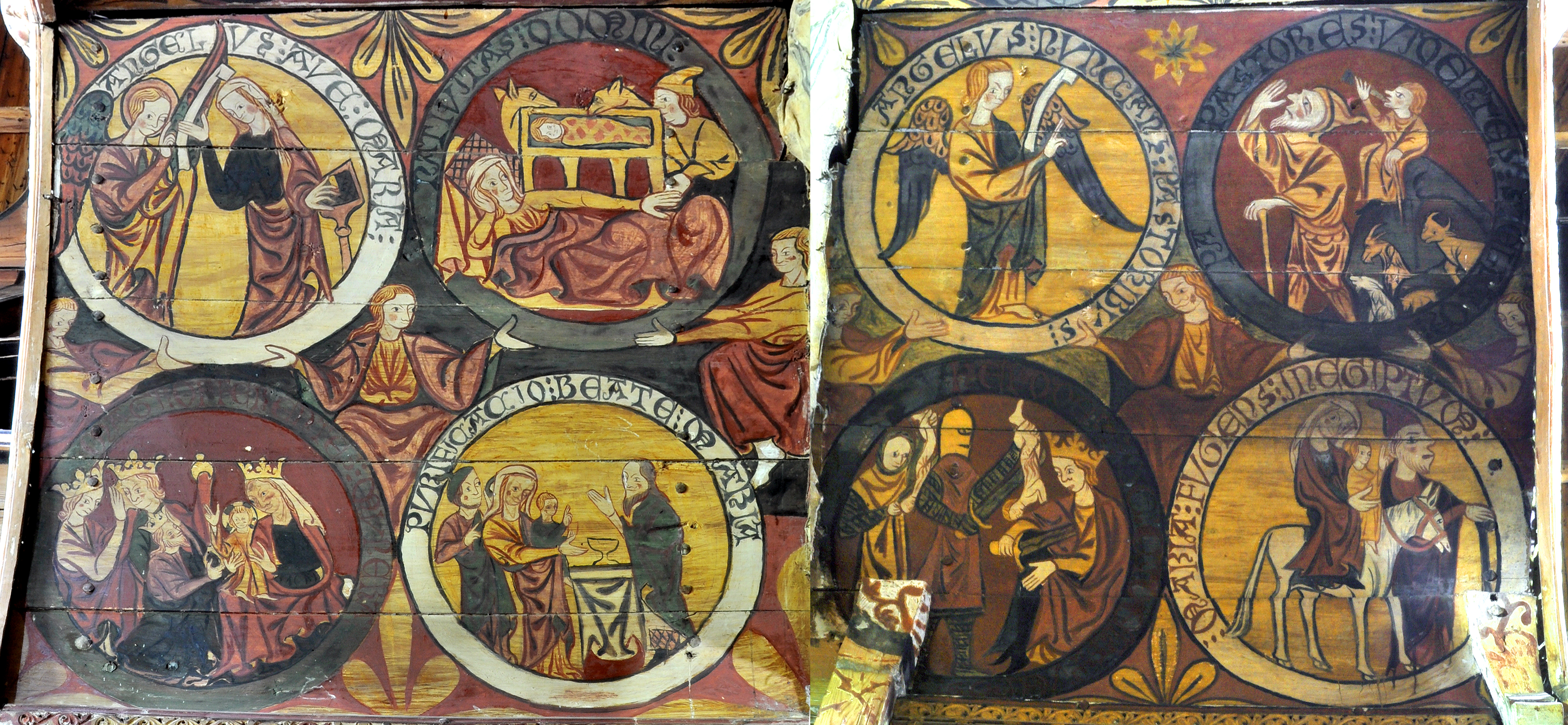
Roof paintings of the baldachin in the stave church Hopperstad

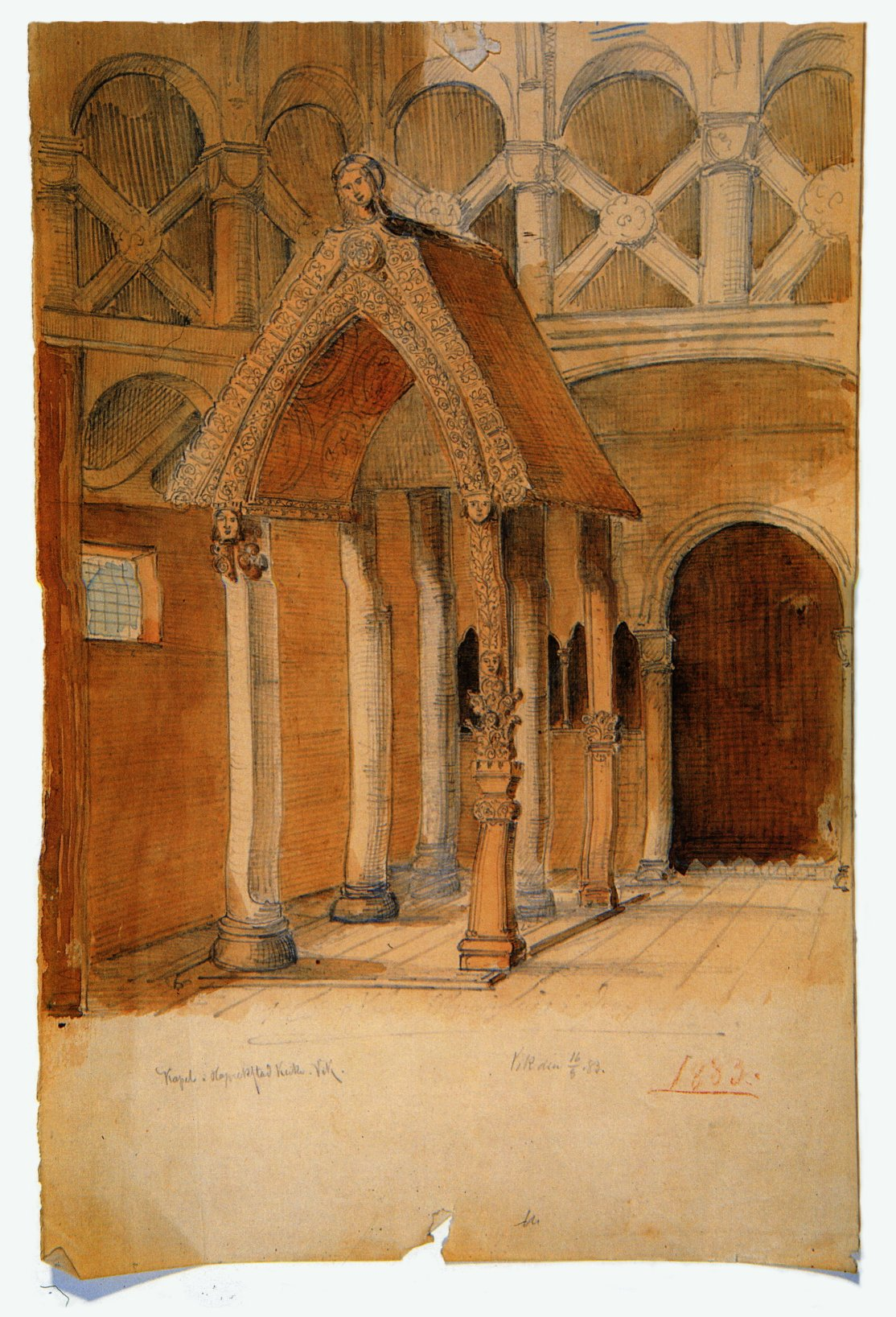
Aquarel from Hopeprstad stave church by Peter Andrias Blix, painted in 1882

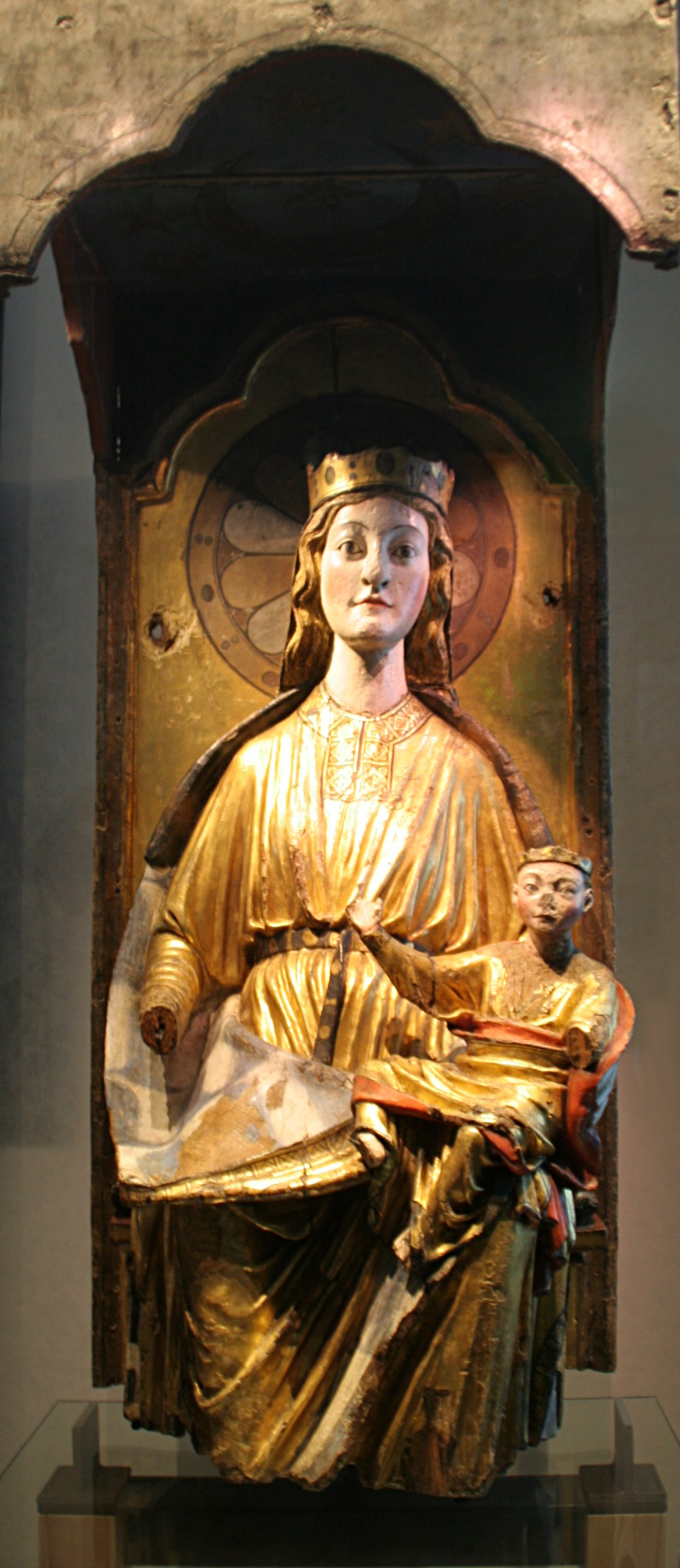
Virgin Mary with the Child (formerly in the Hopperstad Stave Church, now in a museum)

== See also ==
- List of churches in Bjørgvin
