= Hove Church =

Church in Vestland, Norway

- Hove kyrkje
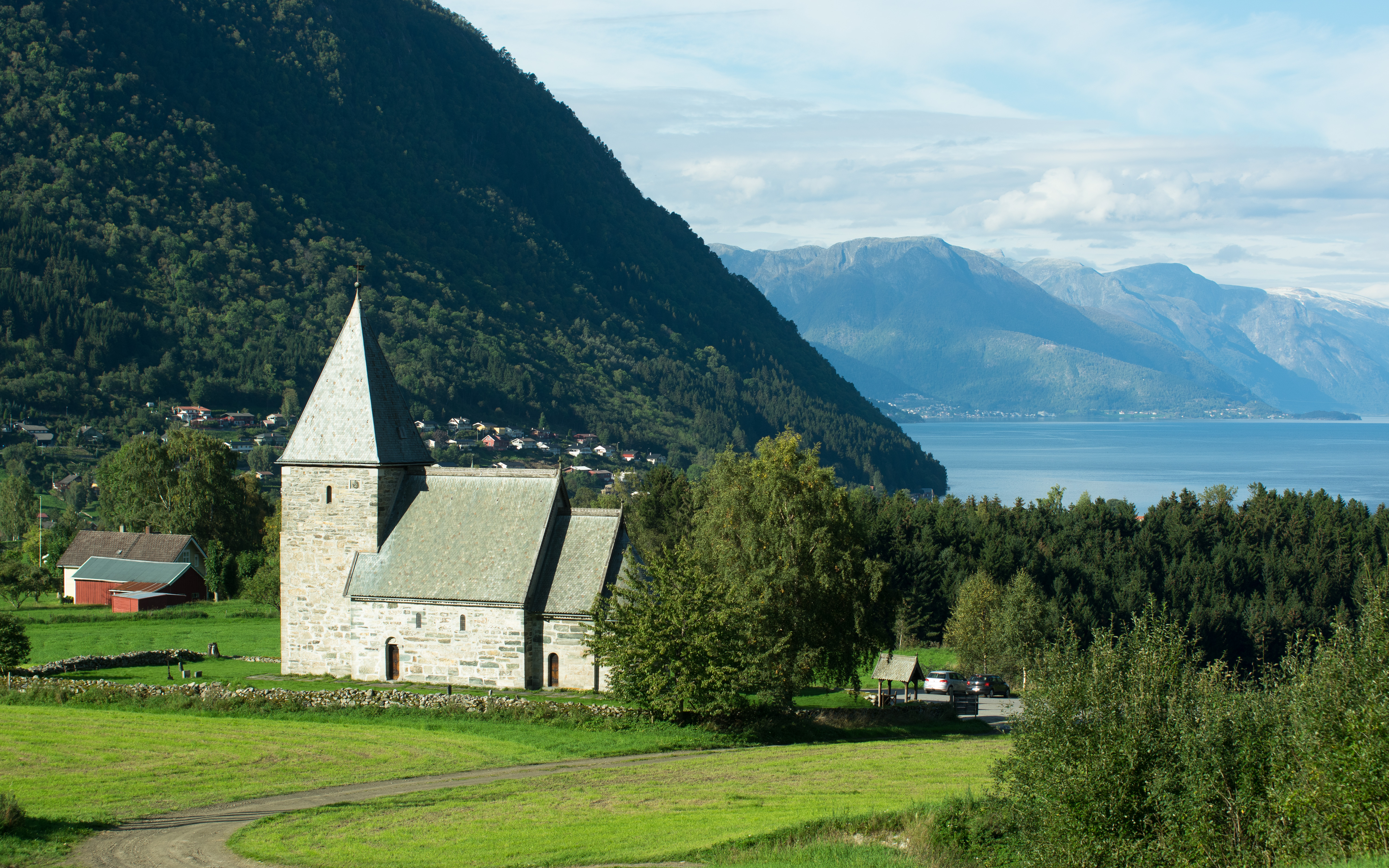
- View of the Hove Church overlooking Vikøyri on the Arnafjord
- Hove Church
- 61°04′18″N 6°35′03″E
- Location: Vik Municipality, Vestland
- Country: Norway
- Denomination: Church of Norway
- Previous denomination: Catholic Church
- Churchmanship: Evangelical Lutheran

History
- Status: Parish church (former)
- Founded: c. 1170
- Consecrated: c. 1170

Architecture
- Functional status: Preserved
- Architectural type: Long church
- Style: Romanesque
- Completed: c. 1170 (856 years ago)
- Closed: 1877

Specifications
- Capacity: 35
- Materials: Stone

Administration
- Diocese: Bjørgvin bispedømme
- Deanery: Sogn prosti
- Parish: Vik
- Norwegian Cultural Heritage Site
- Type: Church
- Status: Automatically protected
- ID: 84644

Hove Church (Norwegian: Hove kyrkje) is a historic parish church of the Church of Norway in Vik Municipality in Vestland county, Norway. It is located in the village of Vikøyri on the Arnafjord, an arm of the Sognefjord. It was historically the main church for Hove parish in the Diocese of Bjørgvin. The gray, stone church was built in a long church design in a Romanesque style around the year 1170 using plans drawn up by unknown architect. Since about 2016 the church has been the base for the Hove Church Music Festival (Hove kyrkjemusikkfestival) run by local cultural personality, Jens Brekke, and an American early music chamber choir. The church seats about 35 people.

The old parish of Hove (together with the neighboring parish of Hopperstad) was abolished in 1875, and replaced by the new, united Vik parish.

== History ==
The earliest existing historical records of the church date back to the year 1340, but the church was not new that year. The church was likely built around the year 1170. Historians believe it was built for a wealthy man who belonged to the very upper echelon within the Norwegian aristocracy. They say he had built this as a private chapel with seating for only about 35 people. The church was constructed in stages. The first part to be built was a rectangular chancel with a rounded apse on the east end. Later, a small nave was added and then later a wooden tower with a stone base was constructed on the west end.

In the 1870s, the old Hove Church and the neighboring Hopperstad Stave Church parishes were both in need of new churches. The issue was first raised by the local parish priest Jørgen Christian Andreas Grøner who complained about the size of the two churches. Both churches were old and small and due to their age, they were in dire need of improvements. The local villagers believed he was exaggerating and the private owners of the church did not want to spend money on the churches. Soon after, the local priest decided to no longer hold services at the Hopperstad Stave Church since it was so cold and drafty. Within a short period of time, it was decided to merge the two neighboring parishes into one larger parish. On 11 December 1875, a royal decree was issued that ordered the closure of both churches and the construction of a new church in Vikøyri for the newly created parish. In 1877, the new Vik Church was constructed and the two older churches were taken out of use and closed.

After the church was closed, it was put up for sale with the intent that the new owners would demolish the old building. The architect Peter Andreas Blix (1831–1901) bought the church in 1880 and restored the church between 1883 and 1888. Blix's goal was to finish the stone church to its original conditions. Soapstone for repairing the walls were brought from the old soapstone quarry in the municipality. Just as when he renovated the nearby Hopperstad Stave Church, Blix removed all the fixtures that were not from the Middle Ages. On the exterior Blix built up a large stone tower on the old base of the tower (it had been a wooden tower from 1600 until the 1880s). It is uncertain whether the church had a wood or a stone tower originally. Blix died in 1901 and he is buried under the floor of the church. He owned the church until his death, and bequeathed it to his brother who then gave it to the state.

The church is still owned by the state, and it is administered by the Society for the Preservation of Ancient Norwegian Monuments. Although it is no longer regularly used by the parish for worship services, it is used for special occasions such as weddings or funerals. Since 2017, the annual Nynorsk Church Music Festival (Nynorsk kyrkjemusikkfestival) has been hosted at the church, with daily Choral Evensong in the English/Anglican tradition, sung by a small chamber choir from England, under the direction of James Reed, a former Cantor in the municipality.

== Media gallery ==
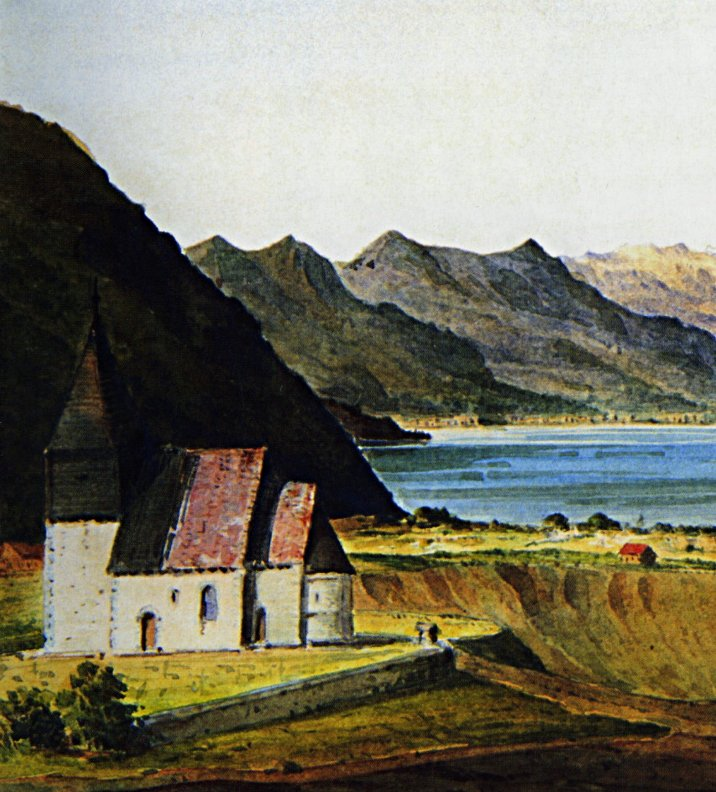

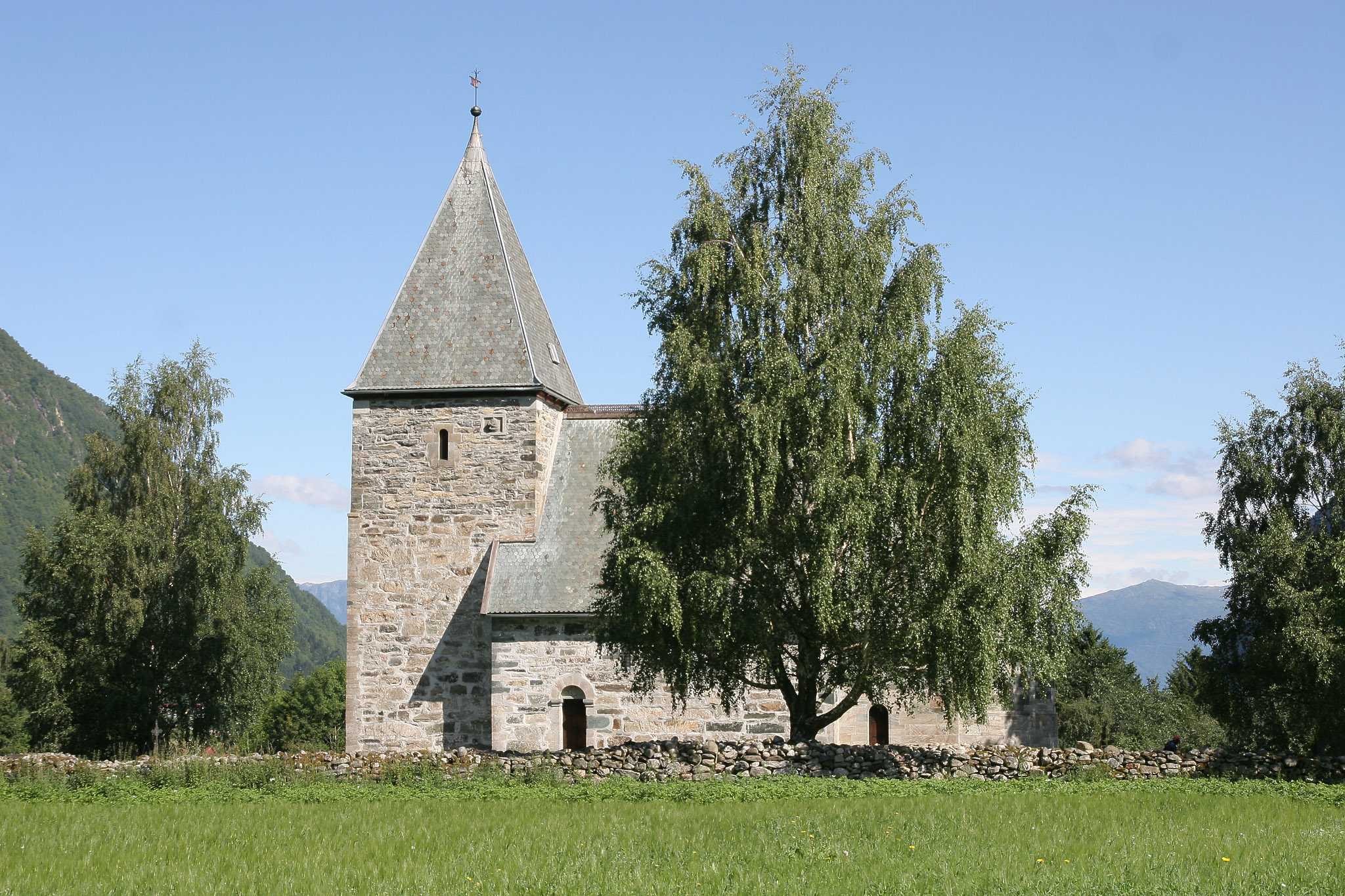

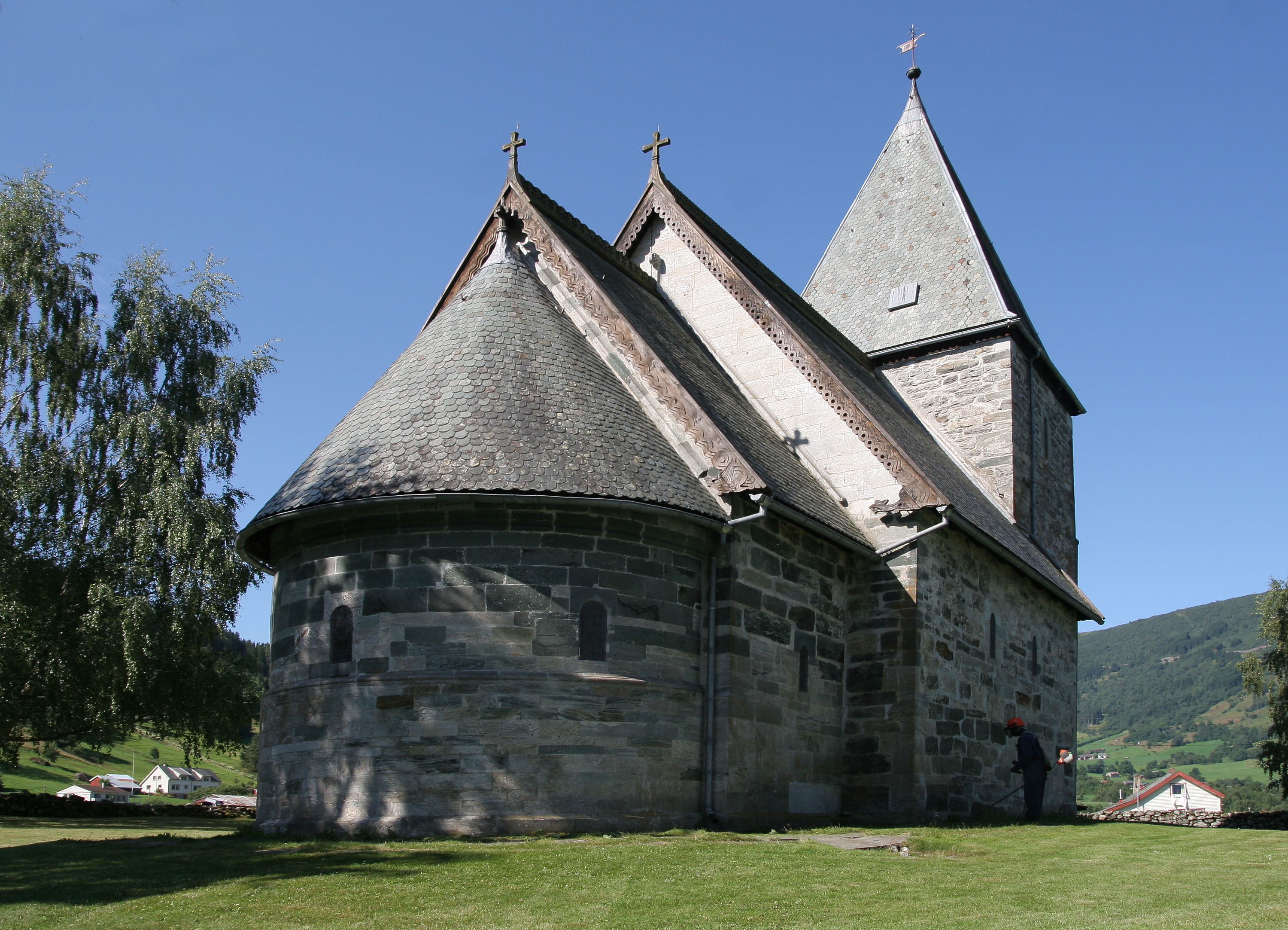

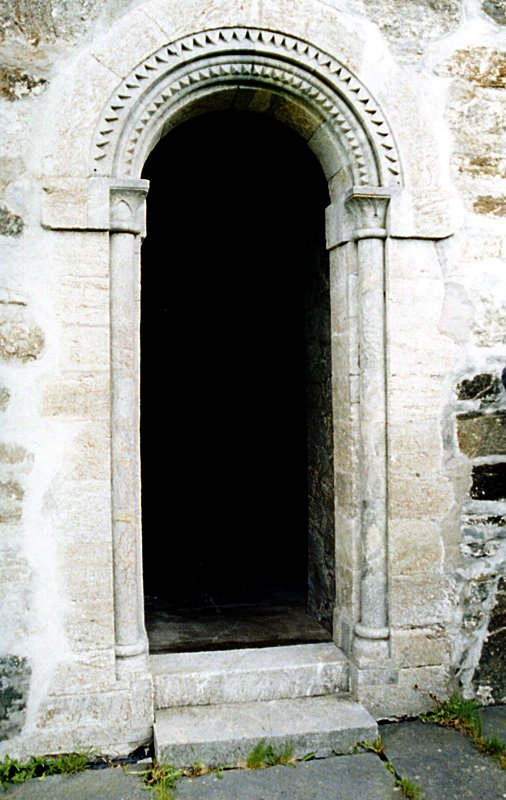

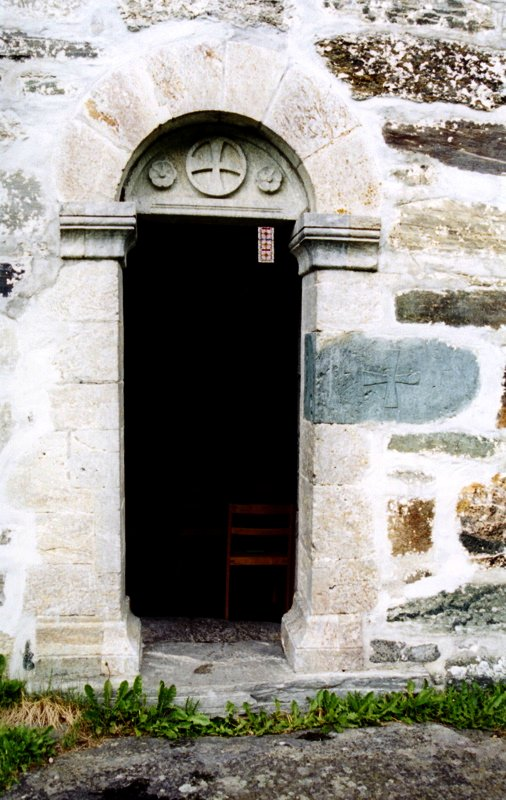

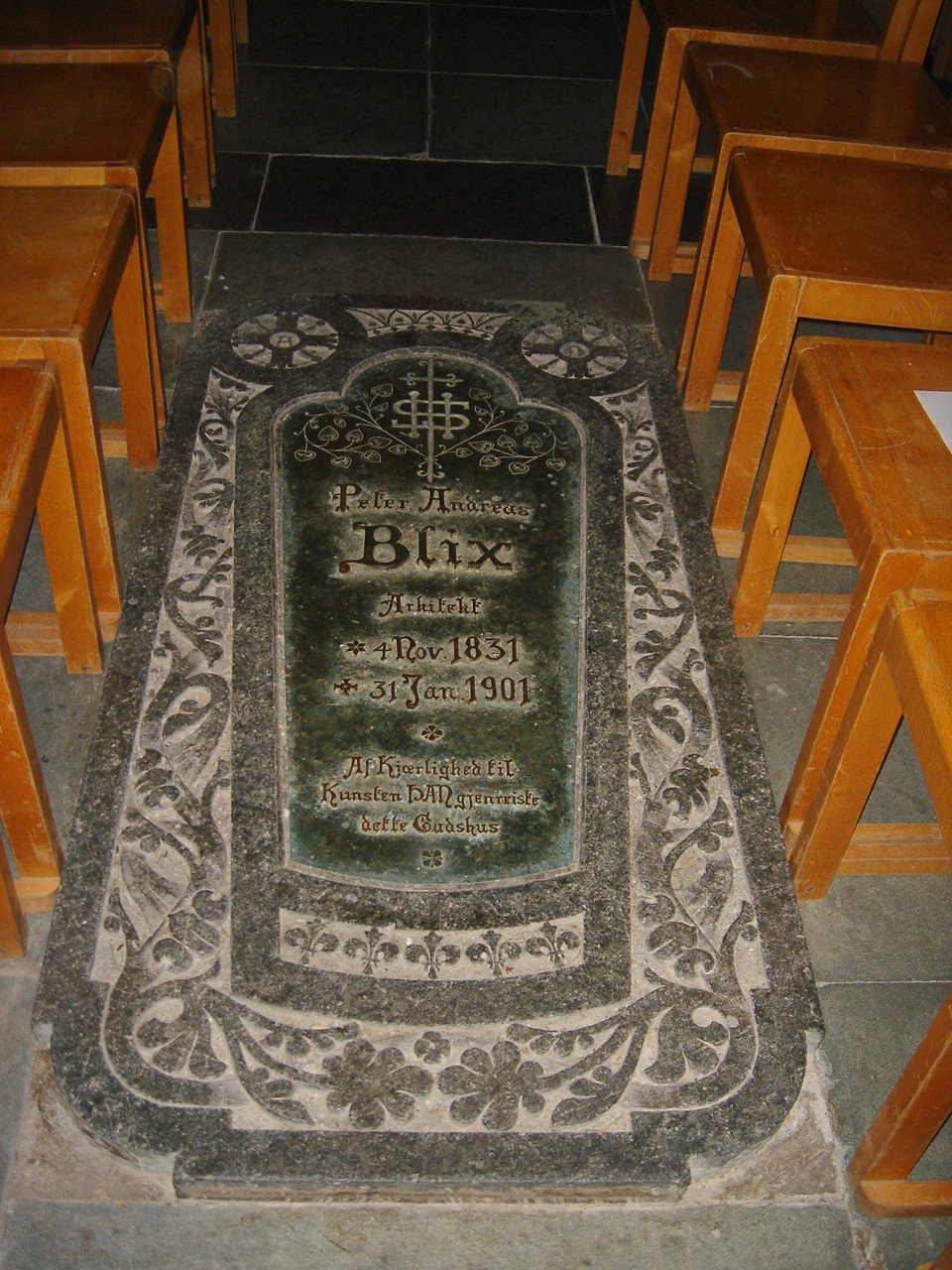

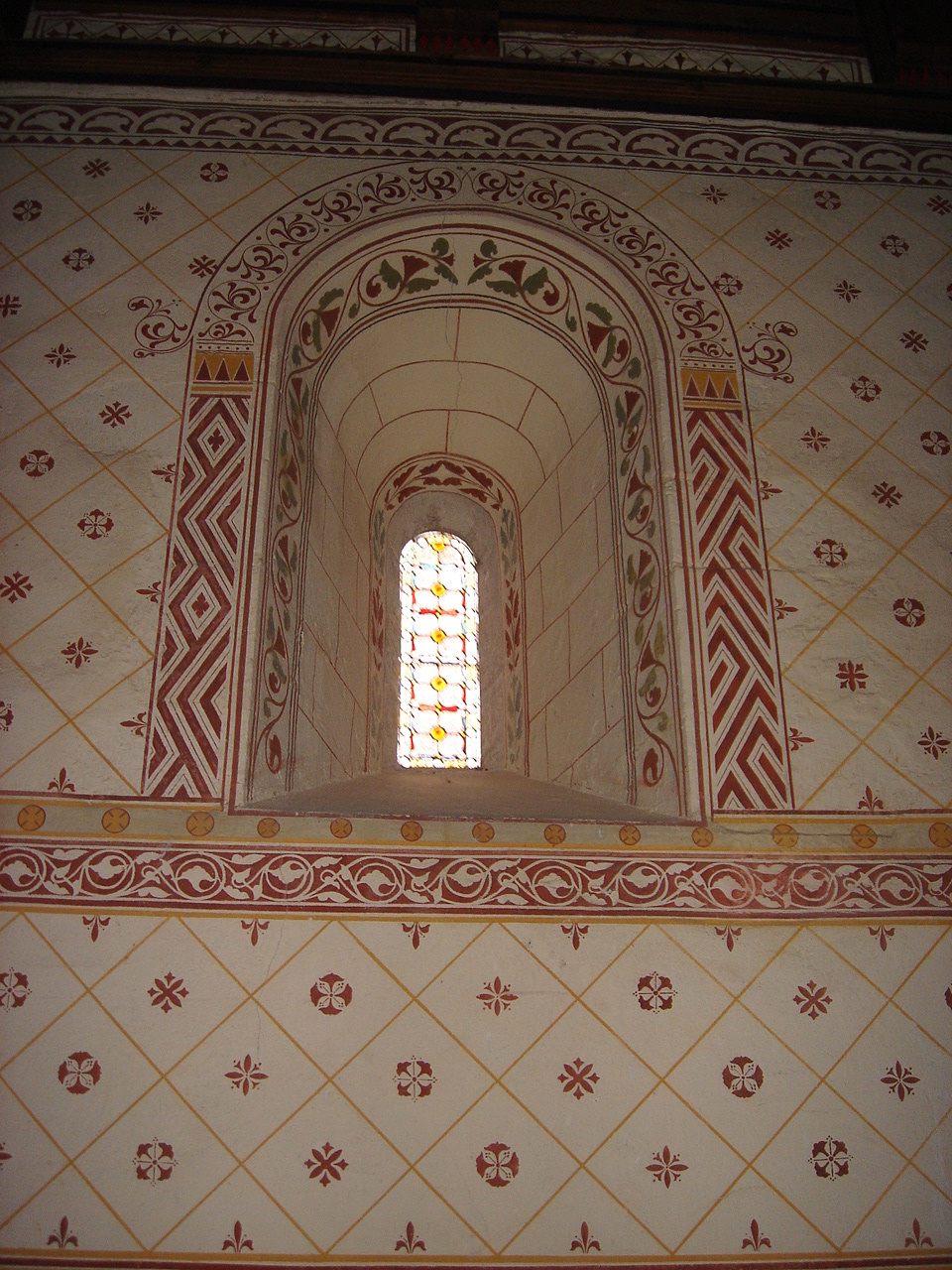

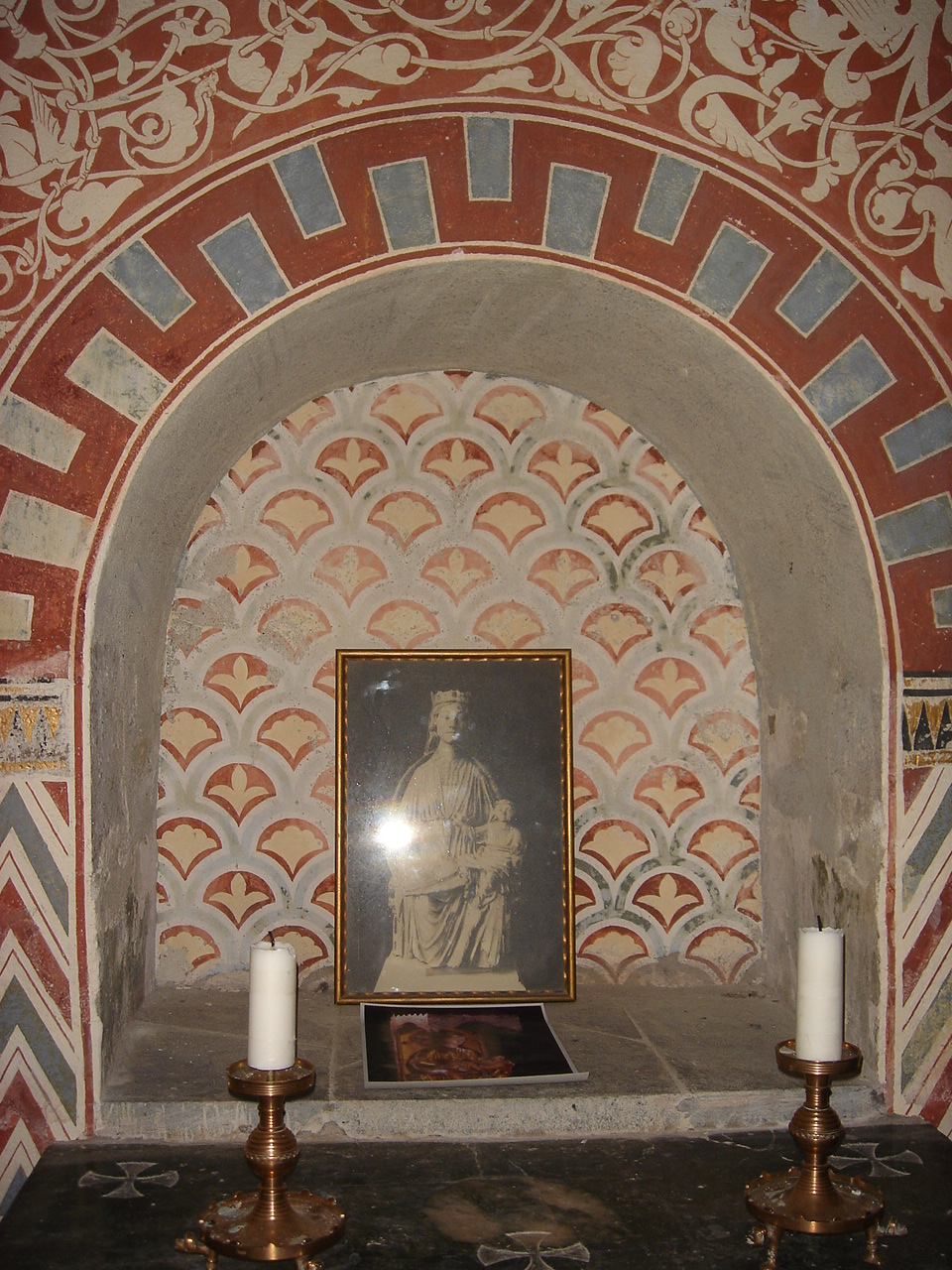

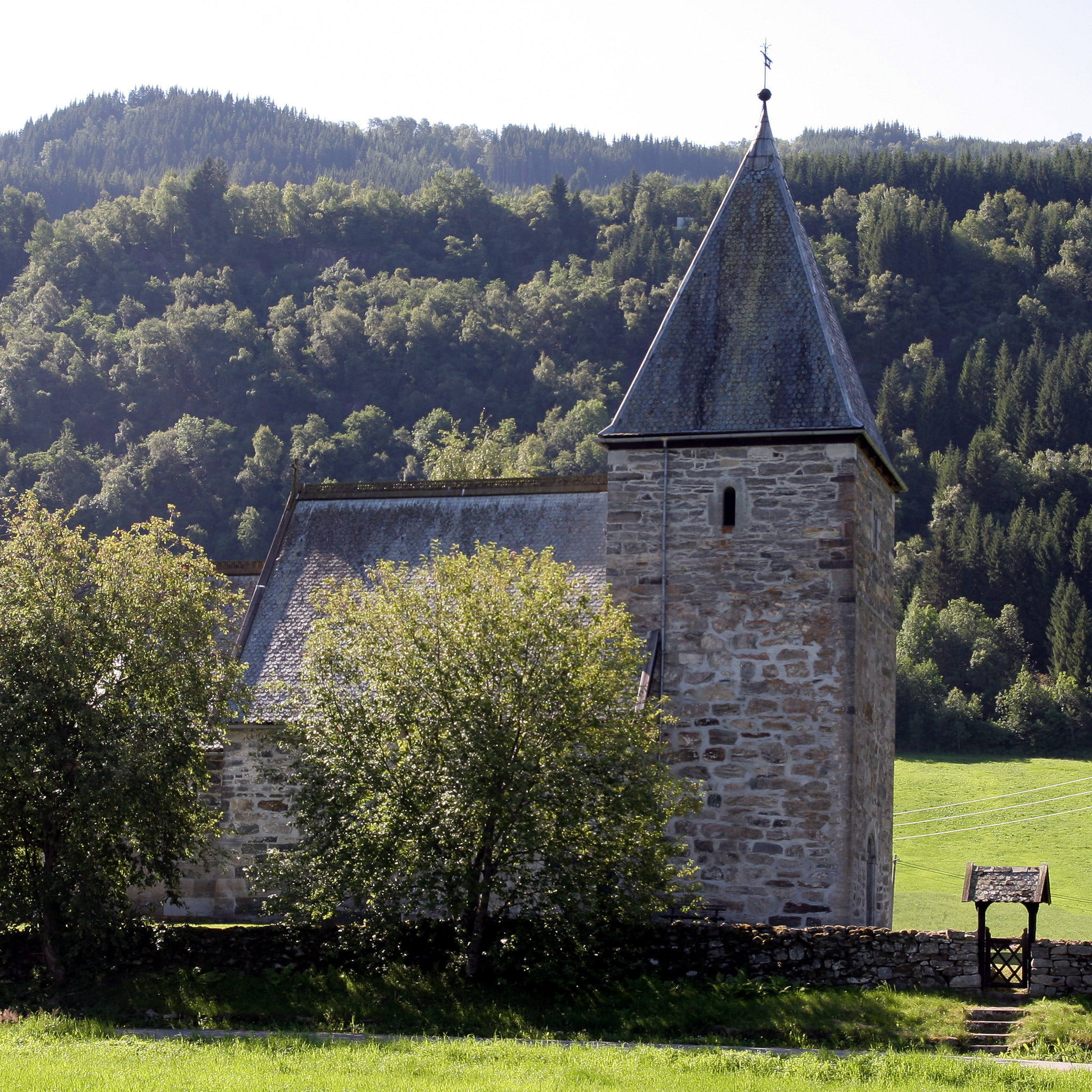

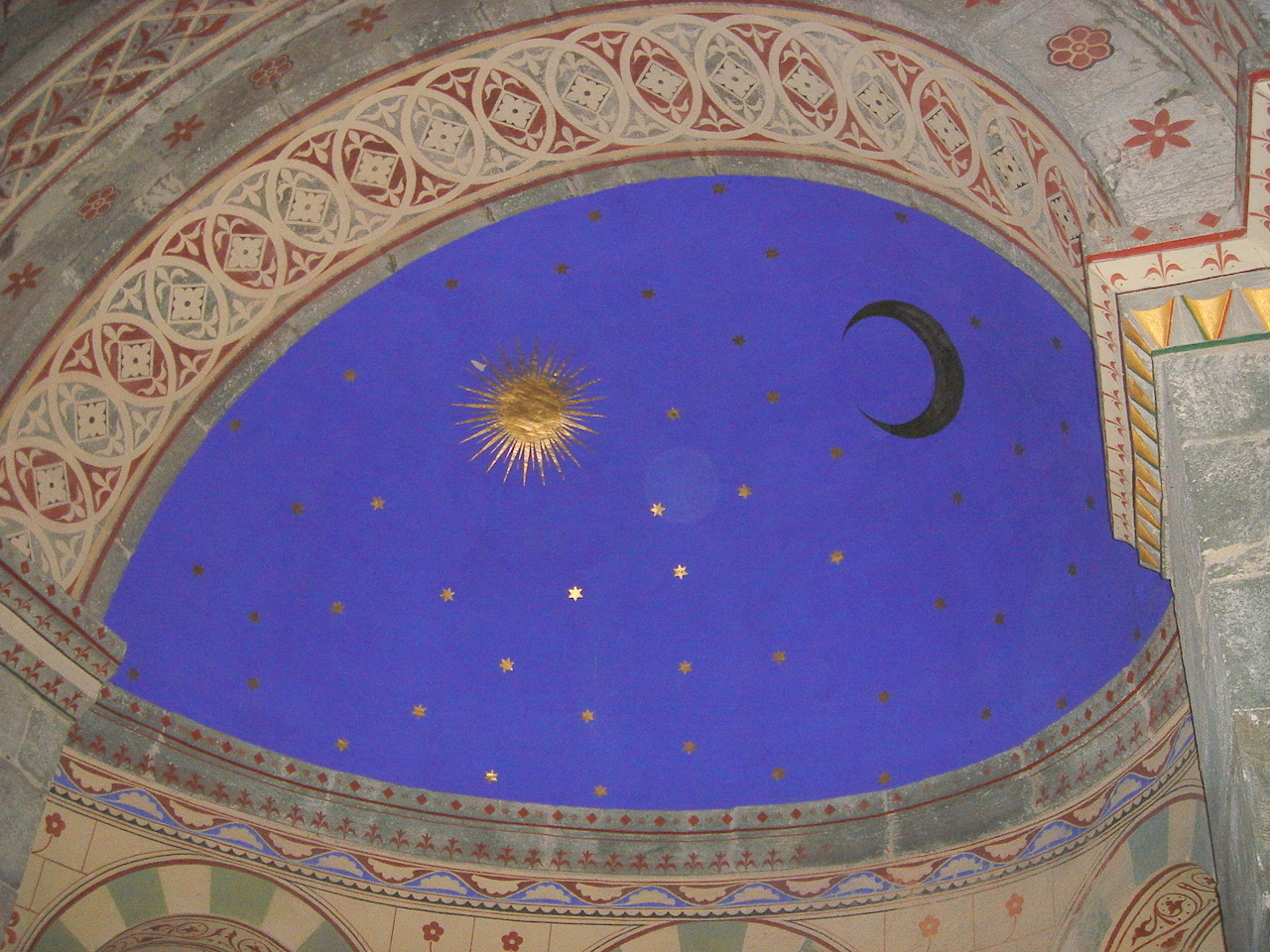

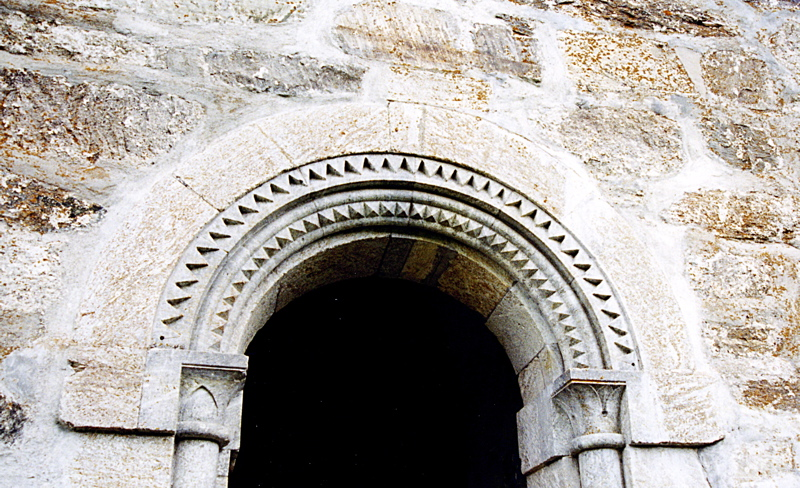

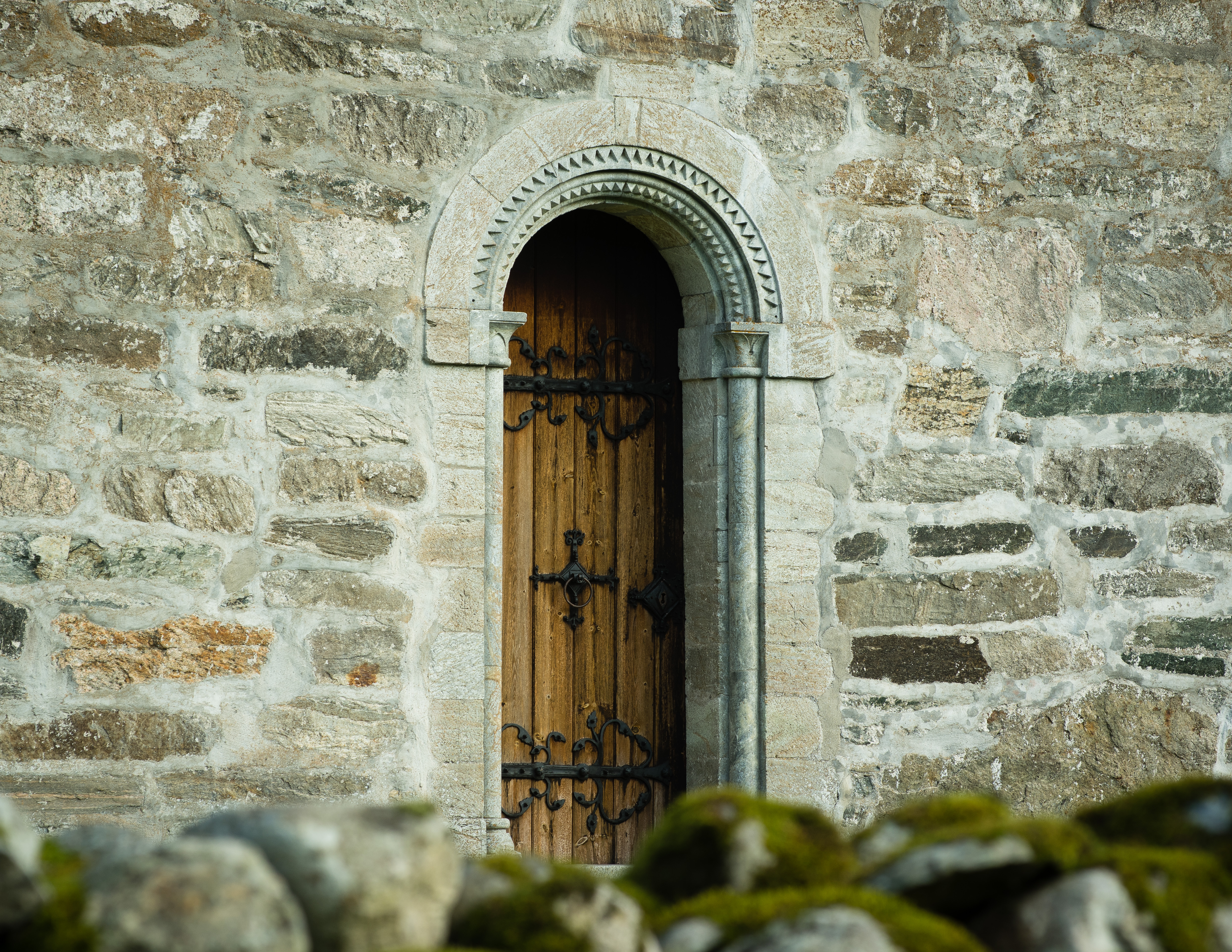

== See also ==
- List of churches in Bjørgvin
