= Vik Church =

Church in Vestland, Norway

- Vik kyrkje
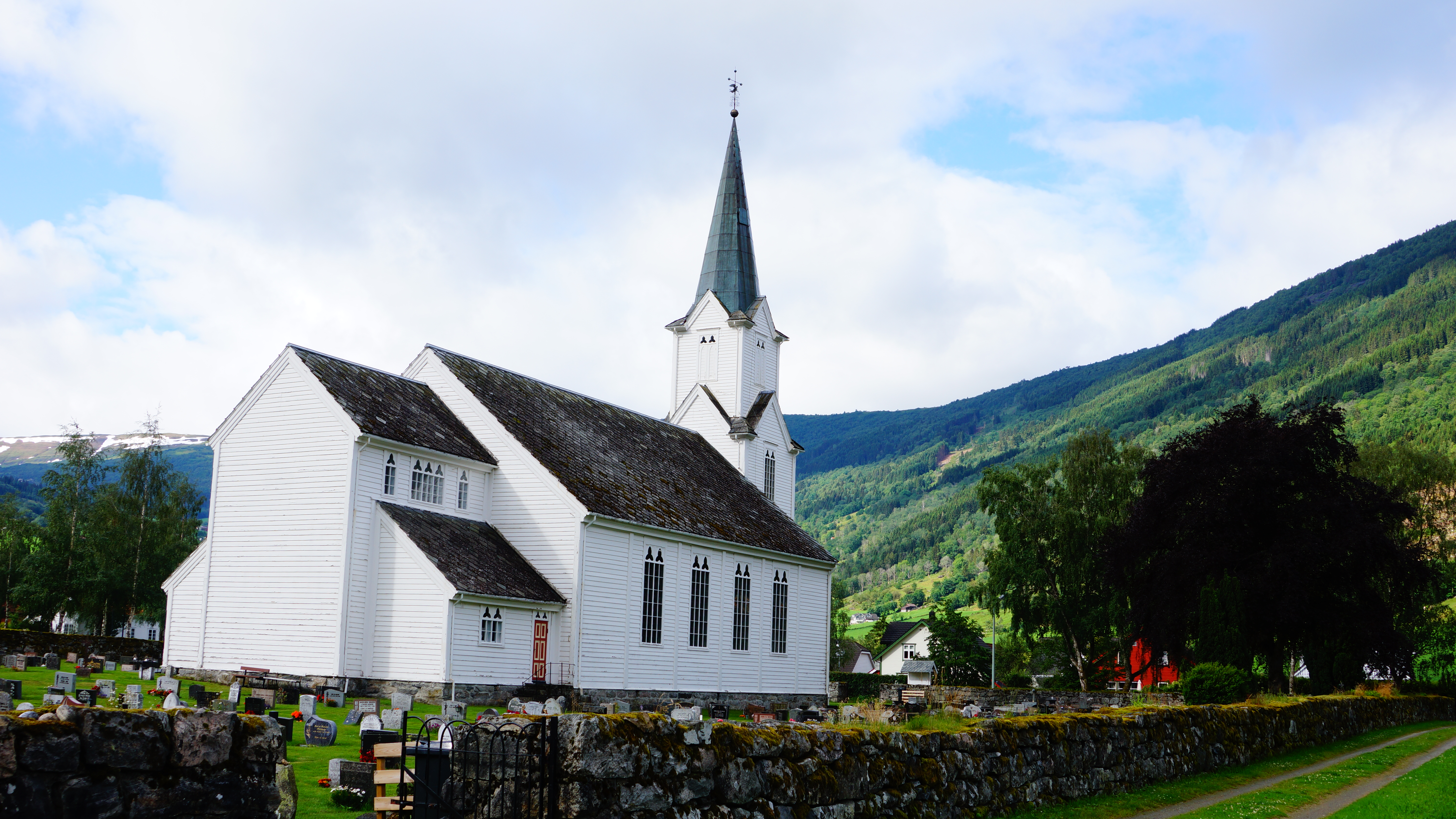
- View of the church
- Vik Church
- 61°04′48″N 6°34′41″E
- Location: Vik Municipality, Vestland
- Country: Norway
- Denomination: Church of Norway
- Churchmanship: Evangelical Lutheran

History
- Status: Parish church
- Founded: 1877
- Consecrated: 23 August 1877

Architecture
- Functional status: Active
- Architect: Haakon Thorsen
- Architectural type: Long church
- Completed: 1877 (149 years ago)

Specifications
- Capacity: 450
- Materials: Wood

Administration
- Diocese: Bjørgvin bispedømme
- Deanery: Sogn prosti
- Parish: Vik
- Norwegian Cultural Heritage Site
- Type: Church
- Status: Not protected
- ID: 85834

Vik Church (Norwegian: Vik kyrkje) is a parish church of the Church of Norway in Vik Municipality in Vestland county, Norway. It is located in the village of Vikøyri. It is the church for the Vik parish which is part of the Sogn prosti (deanery) in the Diocese of Bjørgvin. The white, wooden church was built in a long church design in 1877 using plans drawn up by the architect Haakon Thorsen. The church seats about 450 people.

== History ==
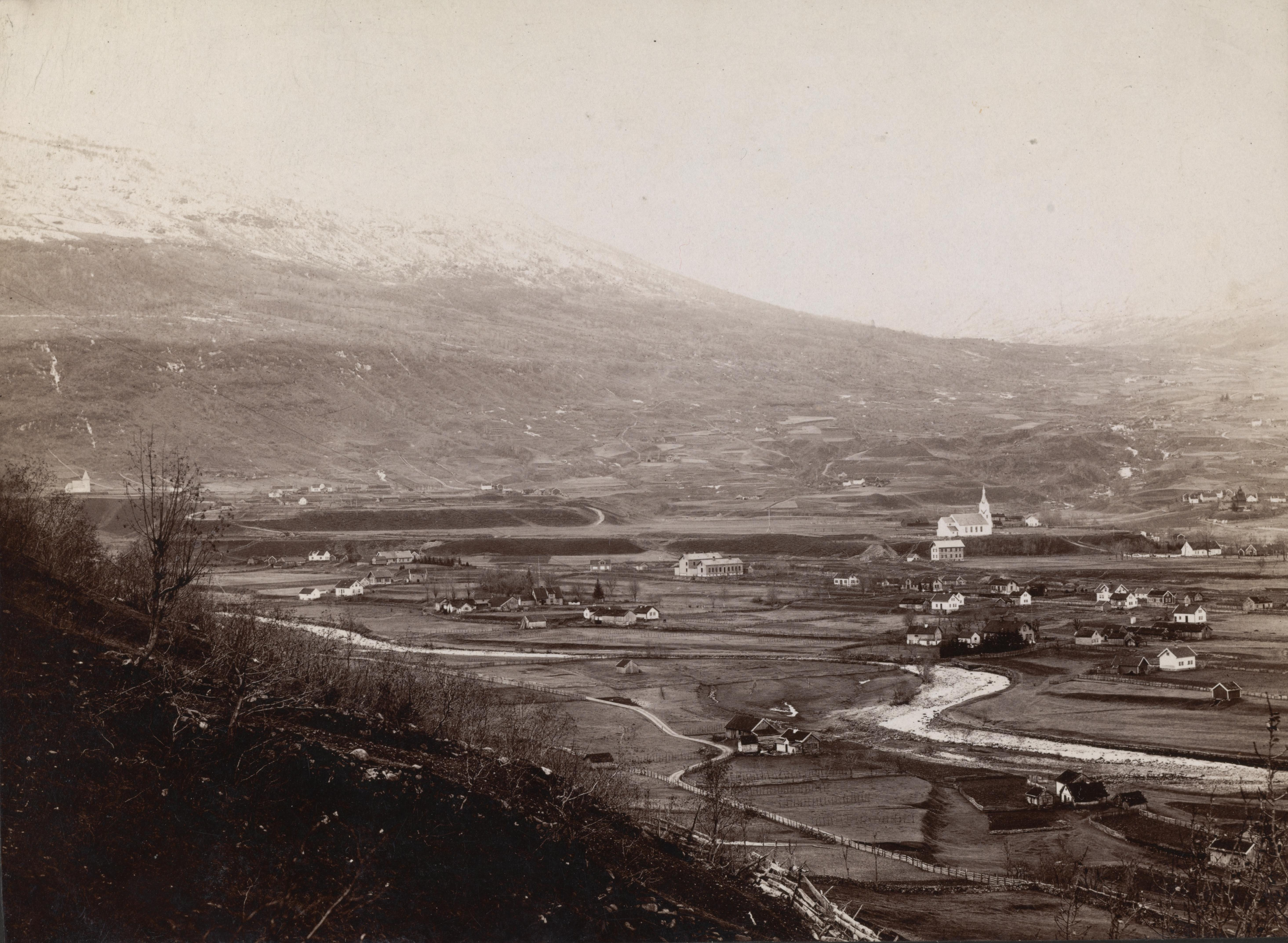
View of the three churches in Vikøyri. The white church on the far left side of the picture is Hove Church. The church in the centre is Vik Church. The dark church on the far right side is Hopperstad Stave Church

In the 1870s, the old Hove Church and Hopperstad Stave Church parishes were both in need of new churches. The issue was first raised by the local parish priest Jørgen Christian Andreas Grøner who complained about the size of the two churches. Both churches were old and small and due to their age, they were in dire need of improvements. The local villagers believed he was exaggerating and the private owners of the church did not want to spend money on the churches. Soon after, the local priest decided to no longer hold services at the Hopperstad Stave Church since it was so cold and drafty. Within a short period of time, it was decided to merge the two neighboring parishes into one larger parish. On 11 December 1875, a royal decree was issued that ordered the closure of both churches and the construction of a new church in Vikøyri for the newly created parish. In 1877, the new Vik Church was constructed and the two older churches were taken out of regular use and preserved as historical sites. The new church was designed by Haakon Thorsen and the lead builder was Ole Vangberg. The new church was consecrated on 23 August 1877 by Bishop Peter Hersleb Graah Birkeland. There was an extensive renovation in 1961–1962 using plans designed by Erlend Tryti.

== See also ==
- List of churches in Bjørgvin
