= Steinsvik =

Coordinates: 60°17′56″N 5°17′56″E

Steinsvik is a grunnkrets and an area of the suburb of Ytrebygda in Bergen municipality, Norway. The area lies between Nordås, Siljustøl, Sandsli and Søreide, with the south side on Nordåsvannet, and has the most villas, but also some tower blocks. The area has 2871 inhabitants, as of 1 January 2009, and an area of 1.18 km², of which 0.03 km² is freshwater.
