= Rasmus Meyer =

Norwegian industrialist and art collector

- Born: 4 June 1858; Bergen, Norway
- Died: 14 January 1916 (aged 57)
- Occupations: Merchant; Mill owner Art collector
- Known for: Rasmus Meyers Collection (Rasmus Meyers Samlinger)

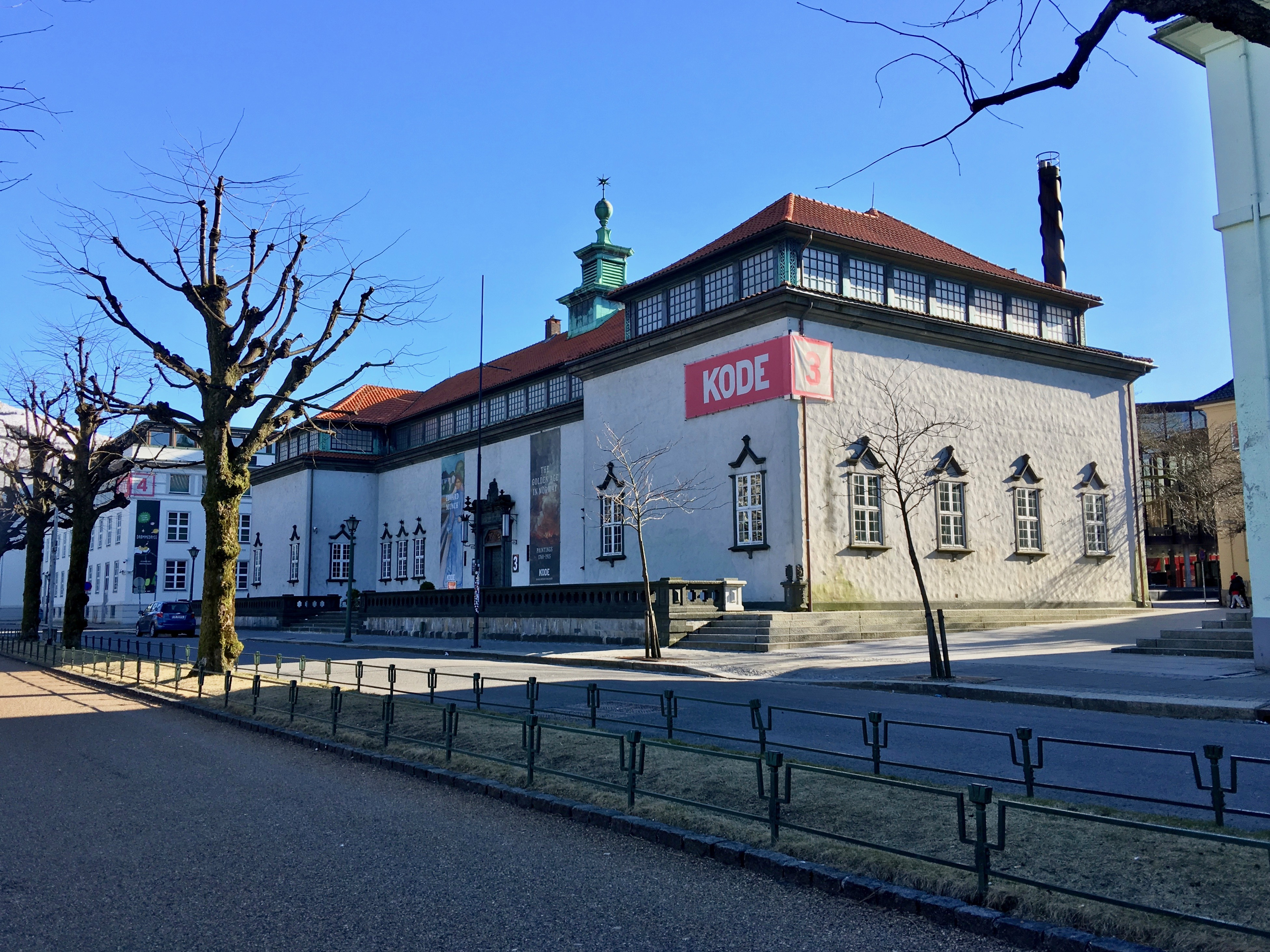
Rasmus Meyers samlinger in Bergen

Rasmus Meyer (4 June 1858 – 14 January 1916) was a Norwegian industrialist, mill owner and art collector. He is most commonly associated with the Rasmus Meyer art collection (Rasmus Meyers samlinger) in Bergen.

== Biography ==
Meyer was born in Bergen, Norway to merchant Gerdt Henrich Meyer (1817-1897) and Kaia Wilhelmine Wold (1831-1864). He graduated from Tanks Upper Secondary School in Bergen in 1874. He studied modern mill operations in Germany and trained at his father's mill, Vaksdal mølle in Hordaland. Together with his father, he built a mill at Vaksdal in 1890. After the death of his father in 1897, Meyer took over the management of Vaksdal mølle. After a fire, he had a new mill built in 1899 which was designed by architect Adolph Fischer (1844-1925). By the early 1900s, he was running the largest milling operation in Norway. In 1912 the firm was transformed into a corporation with Meyer as principal shareholder.

== Personal life ==
Meyer was married to Charlotte Amalie Henriette Koller (1868-1953), the daughter of Karl Theodor Fredrik Koller (1827-1897) and Henriette Conradine von der Recke (1829-1909). He was decorated Knight of the Order of St. Olav in 1911.

== Rasmus Meyers Samlinger ==
Today Rasmus Meyer is best known for his art collection (Rasmus Meyers Samlinger). In 1875, he had undertaken an educational journey through Germany to Italy where he studied art. He began collecting art and in 1905 he acquired the private collection of shipyard owner and art collector Ananias Dekke (1832–1892).

After his own death in 1916, his substantial art collection was donated to the municipality of Bergen by his heirs. The collection is now housed in a building at Lille Lungegårdsvann. The building was designed by architect Ole Landmark and erected in 1924. It now also houses the Stenersen Bergen Collection and Bergen Picture Gallery. Rasmus Meyers Samlinger is associated with KODE which operates several other museum including the Edvard Grieg Museum at Troldhaugen, Harald Sæverud Museum Siljustøl, Ole Bull Museum Lysøen as well the Bergen Art Museum and West Norway Museum of Decorative Art (Permanenten).
