= Kyrkjetangen =

Beach in Bergen, Norway

Coordinates: 60.3205°N 5.2917°E

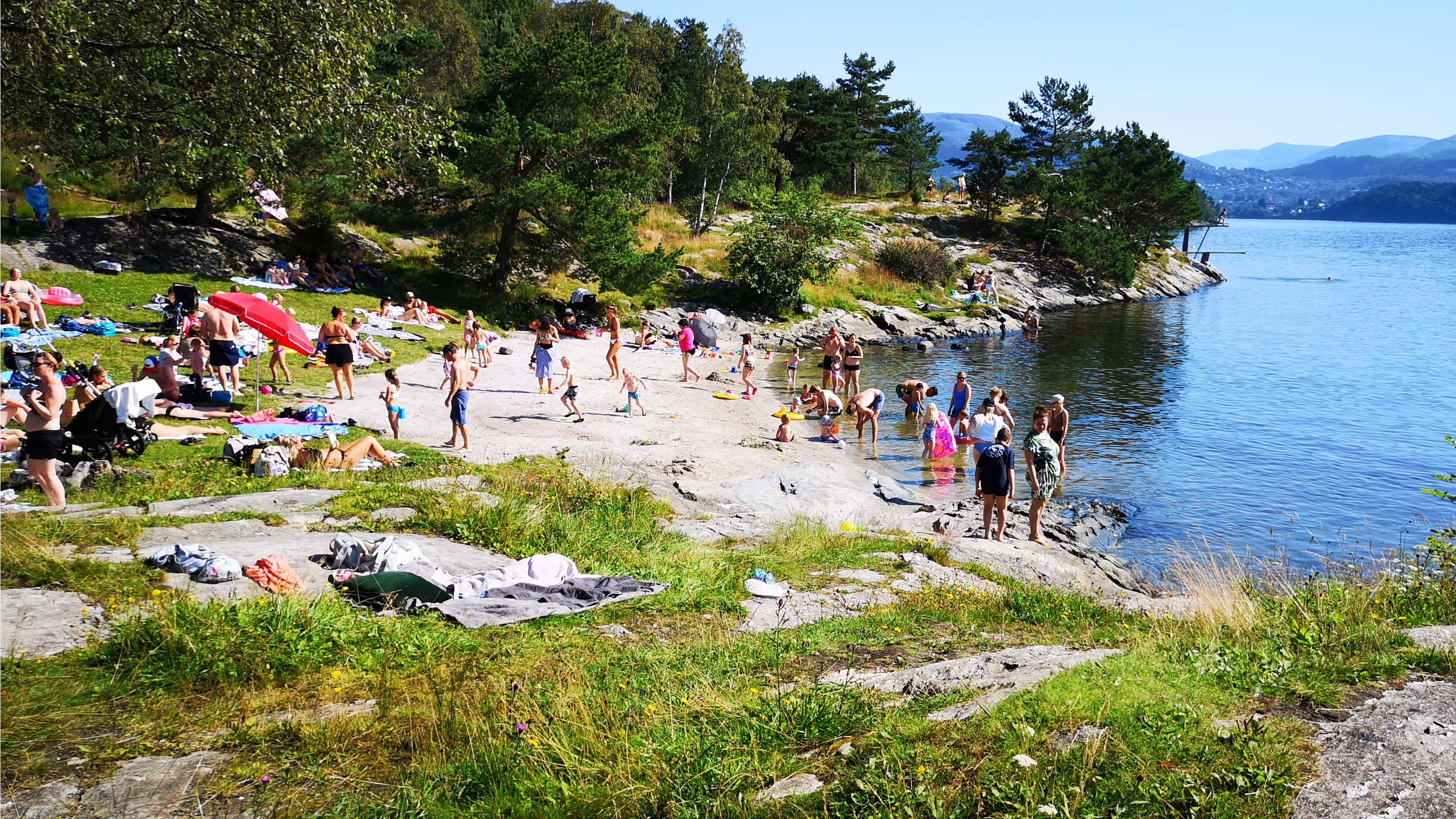
Kyrkjetangen in May 2021

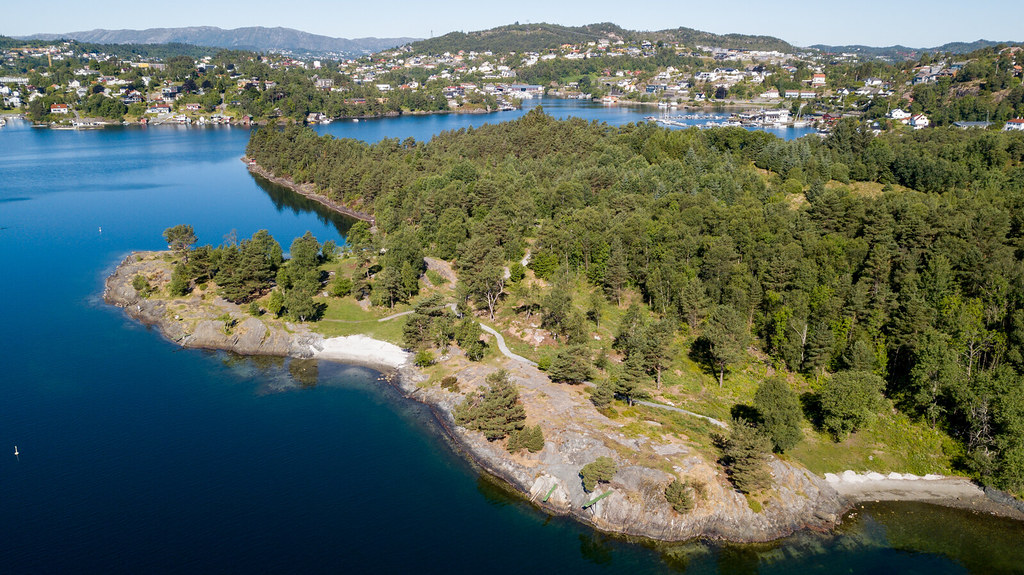
Overview of Kyrkjetangen

Kyrkjetangen is a large and popular swimming spot by Nordåsvannet in Bønes, Bergen. The area has sandy beaches, diving board, toilets and a car park.
