= Loddefjord Church =

Church in Vestland, Norway

- Loddefjord kirke
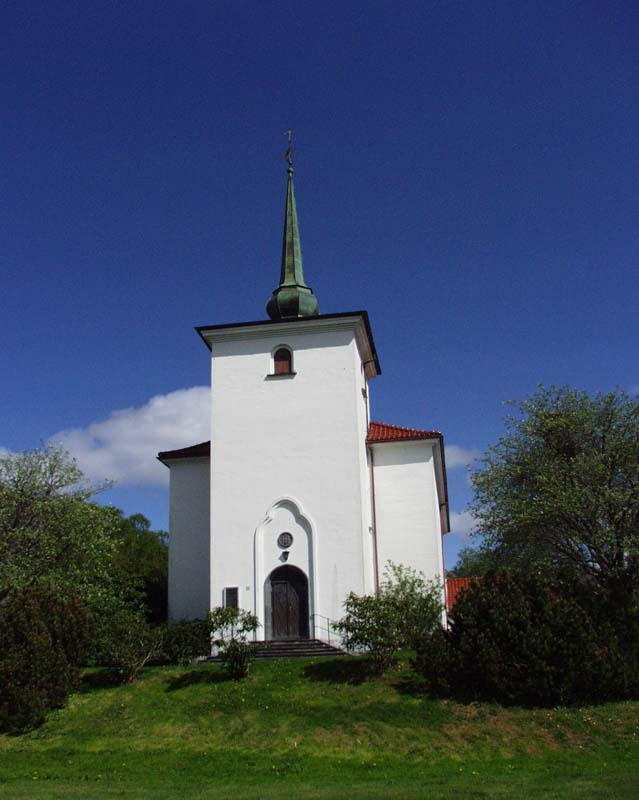
- View of the church
- Loddefjord Church
- 60°21′59″N 5°13′38″E
- Location: Bergen, Vestland
- Country: Norway
- Denomination: Church of Norway
- Churchmanship: Evangelical Lutheran

History
- Status: Parish church
- Founded: 1926
- Consecrated: 17 Dec 1926

Architecture
- Functional status: Active
- Architect: Ole Landmark
- Architectural type: Long church
- Completed: 1926 (100 years ago)

Specifications
- Capacity: 250
- Materials: Stone

Administration
- Diocese: Bjørgvin bispedømme
- Deanery: Bergen domprosti
- Parish: Loddefjord
- Norwegian Cultural Heritage Site
- Type: Church
- Status: Protected
- ID: 84319

Loddefjord Church (Norwegian: Loddefjord kirke) is a parish church of the Church of Norway in Bergen Municipality in Vestland county, Norway. It is located in the Loddefjord neighborhood in the city of Bergen. It is the church for the Loddefjord parish which is part of the Bergen domprosti (arch-deanery) in the Diocese of Bjørgvin. The white, stone church was built in a long church design in 1926 using plans drawn up by the architect Ole Landmark. The church seats about 250 people.

== History ==
The new parish of Loddefjord was established in 1915. It wasn't until the mid-1920s, however, when the church was constructed. Land for the church was given by the factory owner, Fasmer. The church was built in 1925-1926 and it was consecrated on 17 December 1926. The church underwent a major renovation in 1956.

== Media gallery ==
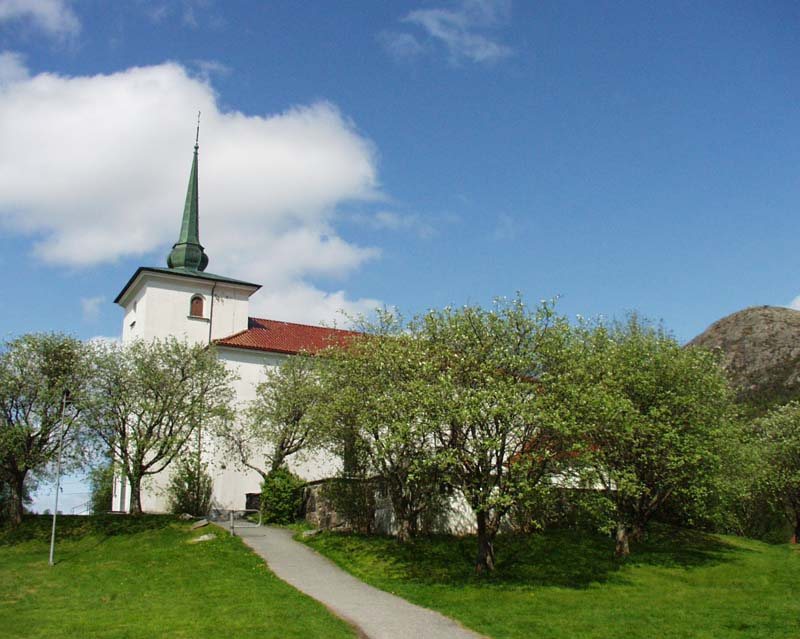

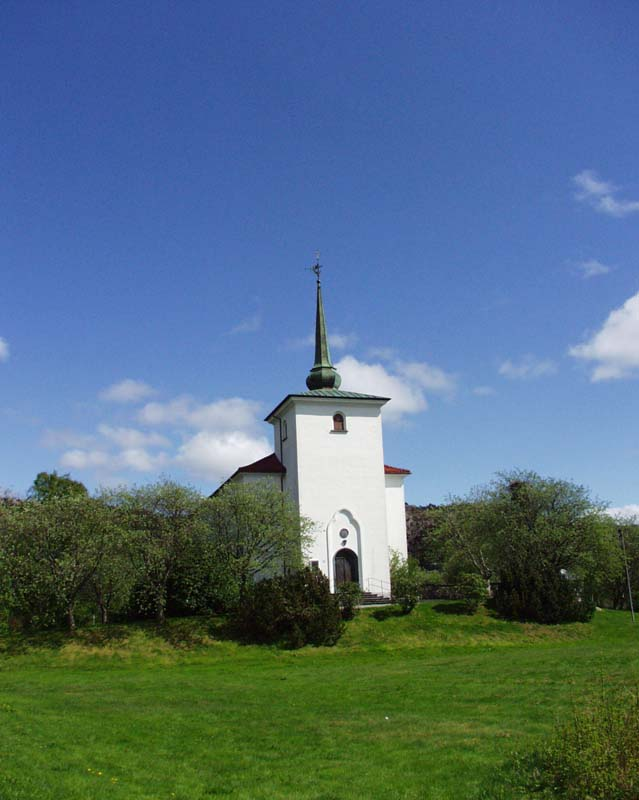

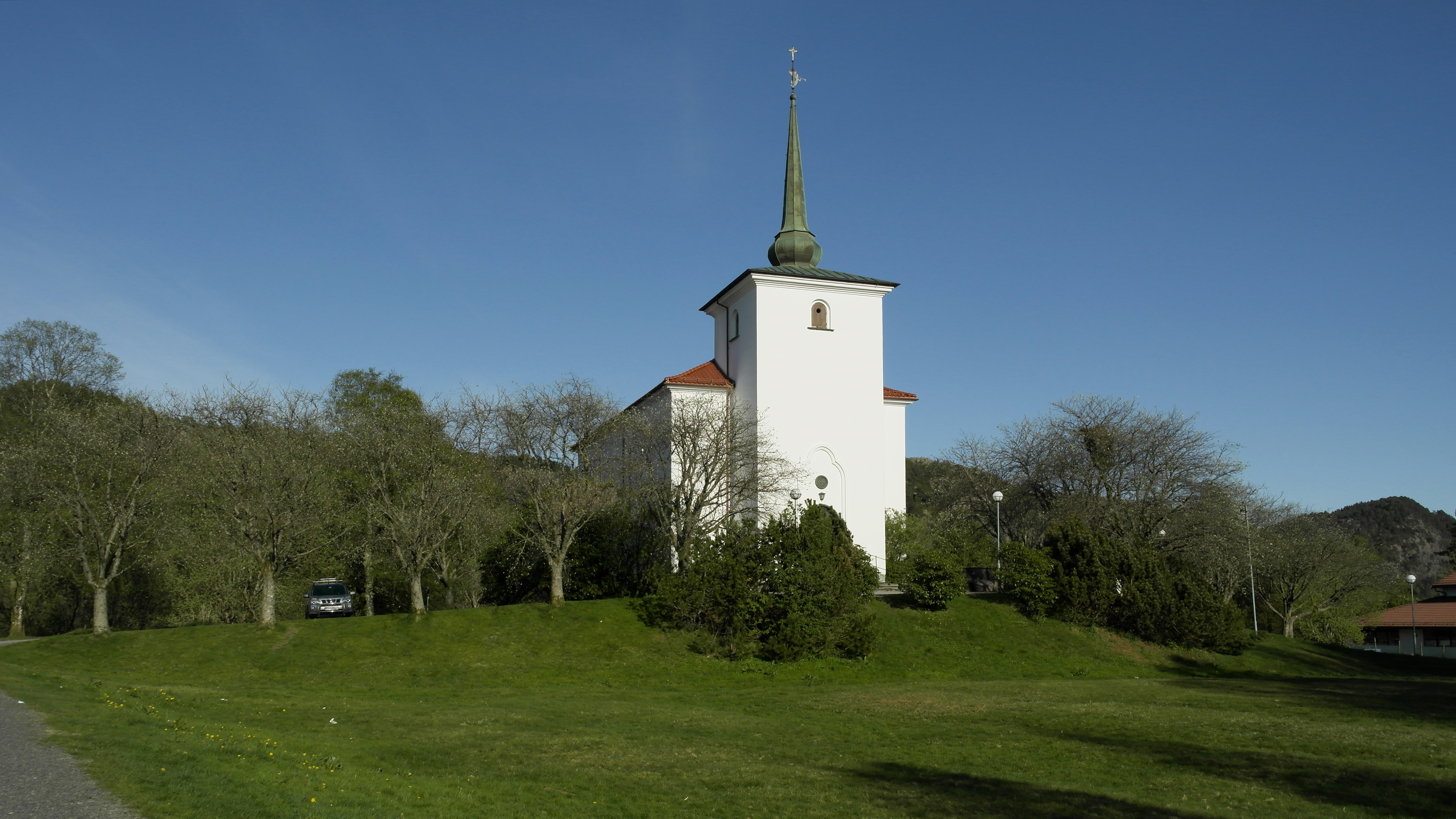

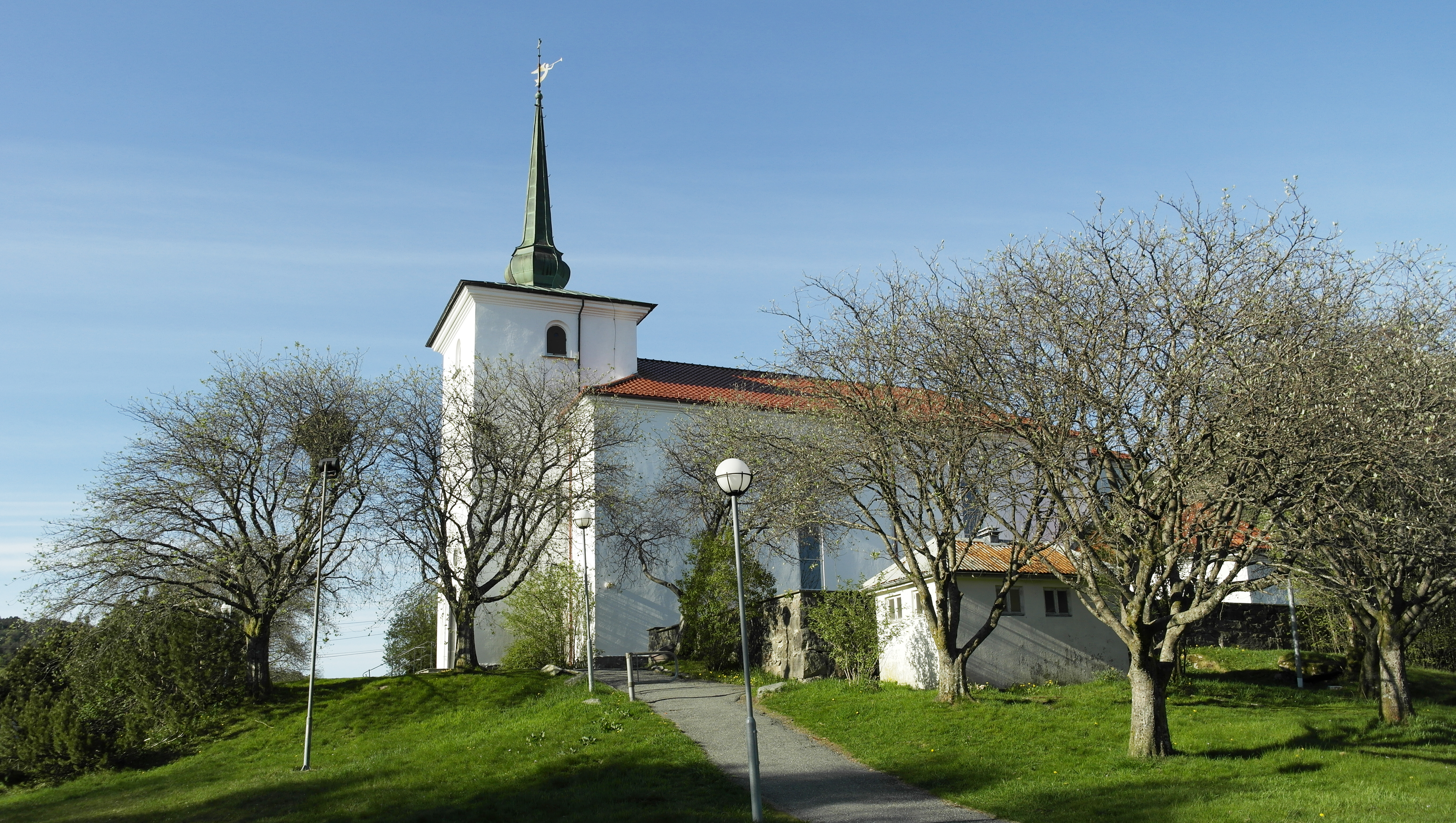

== See also ==
- List of churches in Bjørgvin
