= Lorentz Reitan =

Norwegian musicologist

Lorentz Reitan (born 5 January 1946) is a Norwegian musicologist.

He was born in Haugesund. He was an associate professor at Bergen Teacher's College from 1976 to 1989, then director of the Bergen International Festival from 1990 to 1995. From 1995 to 1998 he was their press director, and in 1998 he became the director of the Bergen Philharmonic Orchestra. He is also author of the book Harald Sæverud - Mannen, musikken, mytene (1997).
