= Storetveit Church =

Church in Vestland, Norway

- Storetveit kirke
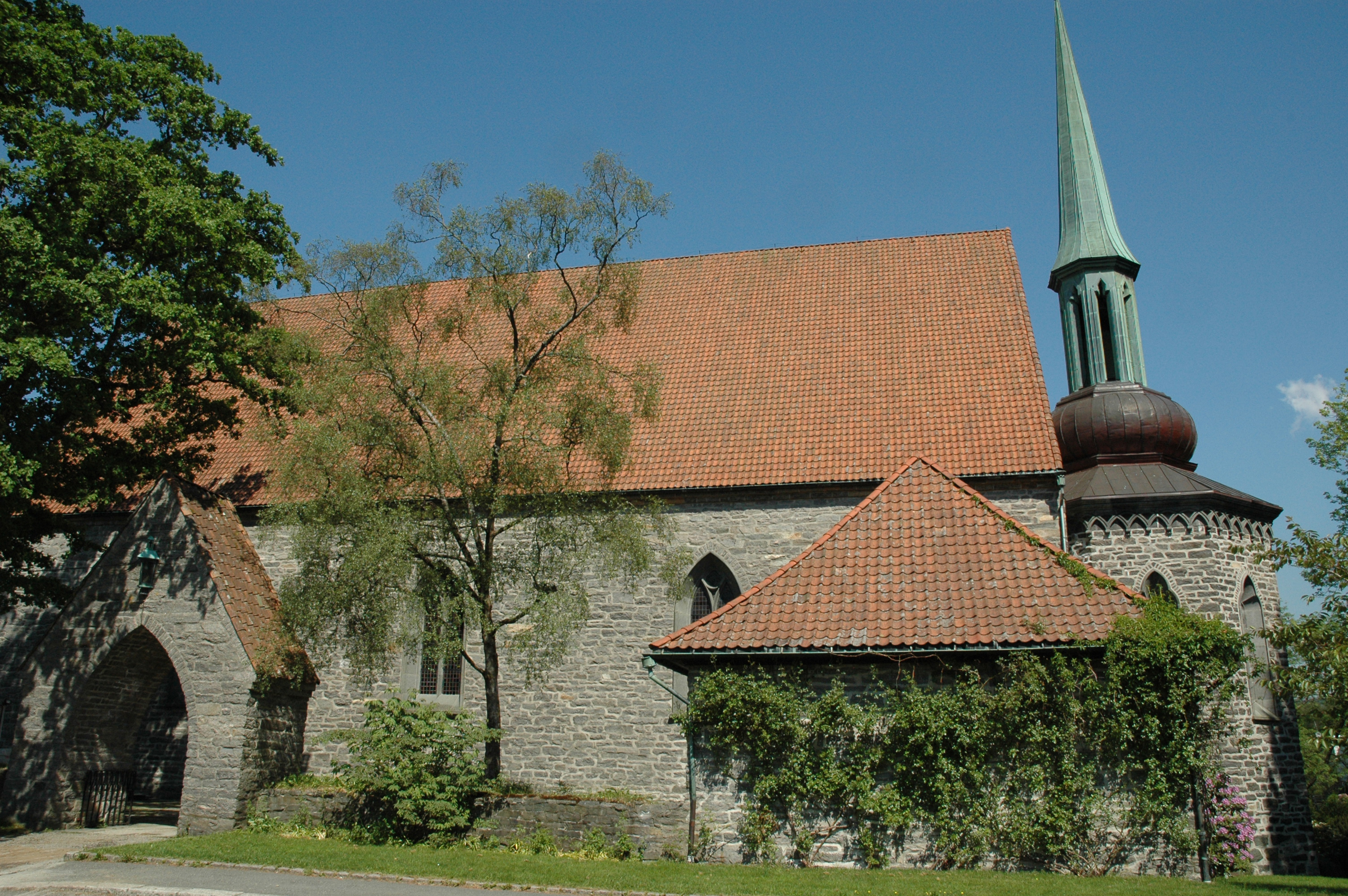
- View of the church
- Storetveit Church
- 60°21′06″N 5°20′42″E
- Location: Bergen, Vestland
- Country: Norway
- Denomination: Church of Norway
- Churchmanship: Evangelical Lutheran

History
- Status: Parish church
- Founded: 1930
- Consecrated: 30 Nov 1930

Architecture
- Functional status: Active
- Architect: Ole Landmark
- Architectural type: Long church
- Completed: 1930 (96 years ago)

Specifications
- Capacity: 600
- Materials: Stone

Administration
- Diocese: Bjørgvin bispedømme
- Deanery: Bergensdalen prosti
- Parish: Storetveit
- Norwegian Cultural Heritage Site
- Type: Church
- Status: Protected
- ID: 85582

Storetveit Church (Norwegian: Storetveit kirke) is a parish church of the Church of Norway in Bergen Municipality in Vestland county, Norway. It is located in the Fjøsanger neighborhood in Årstad borough in the city of Bergen. It is the church for the Storetveit parish which is part of the Bergensdalen prosti (deanery) in the Diocese of Bjørgvin. The large, stone church was built in a long church design in 1930 using plans drawn up by the architect Ole Landmark. The church seats about 600 people.

== History ==
During the 1920s, plans were made to build another church in the large Årstad Church parish. Originally, the church was going to be built at Minde, but the plot of land ended up being unsuitable for the church, so a new plot of land at Storetveit was chosen. An architectural competition was held to find the person to design the new church. Ole Landmark won the competition for his designs of a church built in natural stone with Gothic details. Construction on the new church took place from 1928 to 1930. The church has a large rectangular nave with an octagonal choir. A small tower with a spire sits above the choir. There was a sacristy built to the north of the nave and a chapel on the south side of the nave. The new building was consecrated on 30 November 1930.

According to the judgment of the Eidsivating Court Of Appeal (Norway) No. 93-02768M dated 05/16/1994, Varg Vikernes (Burzum band) between 27 and 29 May 1992, at Minde, broke a window in the bell tower of Storetveit church. In an attempt to set fire to and completely destroy the bell tower, he threw bark and wood shavings through the window, then poured petrol over them and set them alight. Open flames arose immediately but extinguished themselves after a short time. As a result, there was fire damage to the window and window frame, as well as the stairs, and soot and scorch marks on the exterior wall of the bell tower.

== Media gallery ==
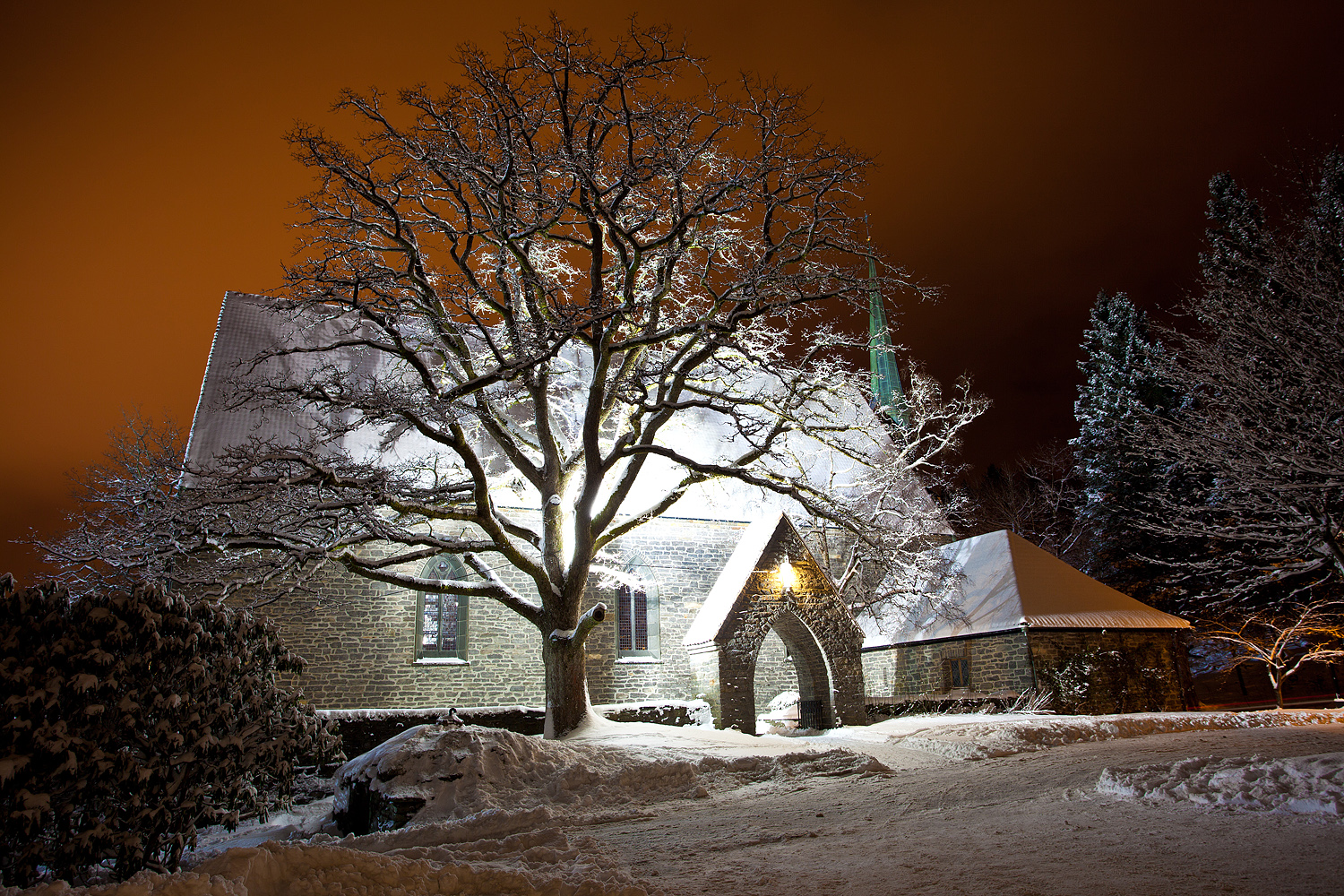

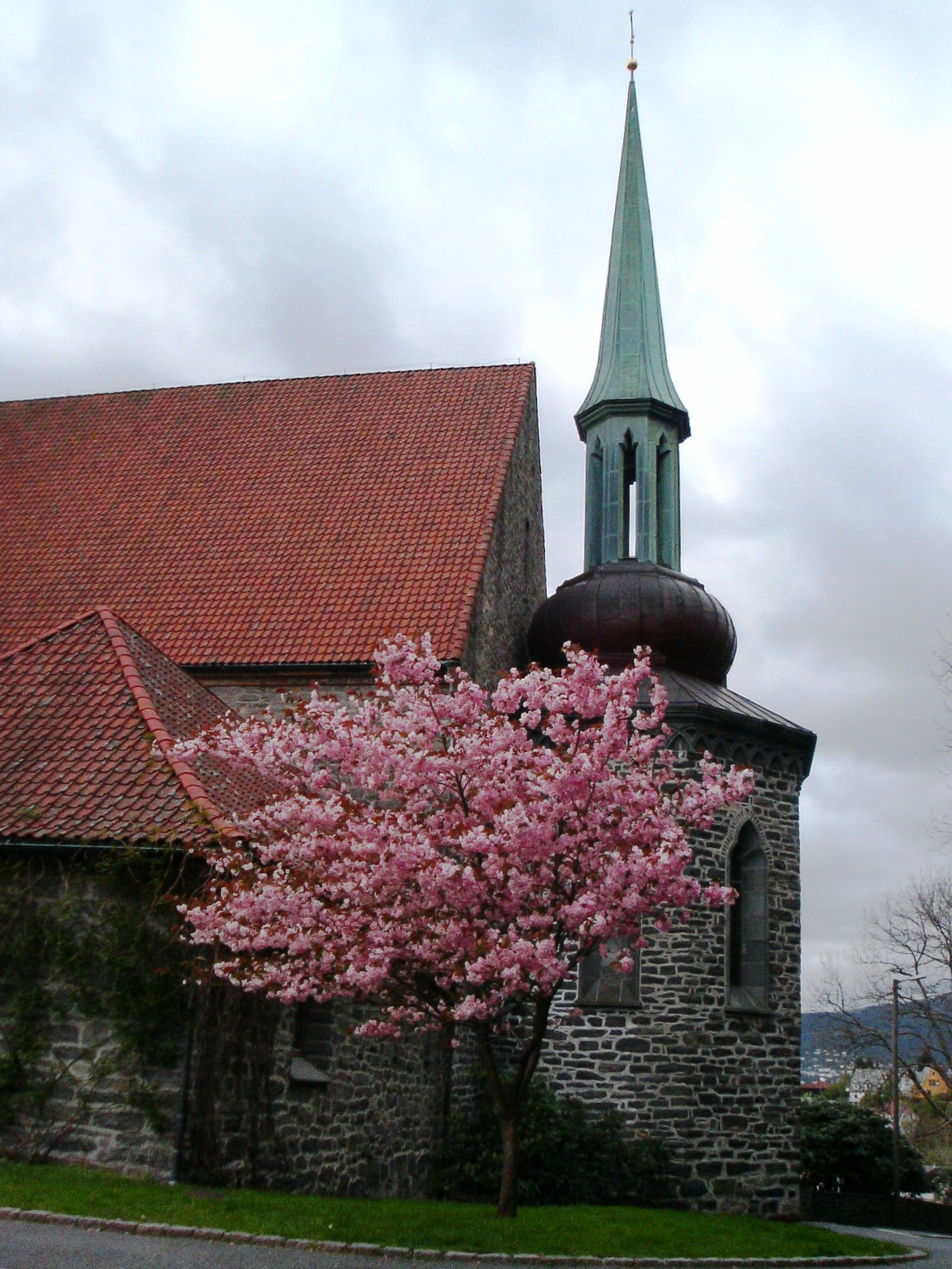

== See also ==
- List of churches in Bjørgvin
