= Ytrebygda =

Borough of Bergen, Norway

Ytrebygda bydel
- Borough
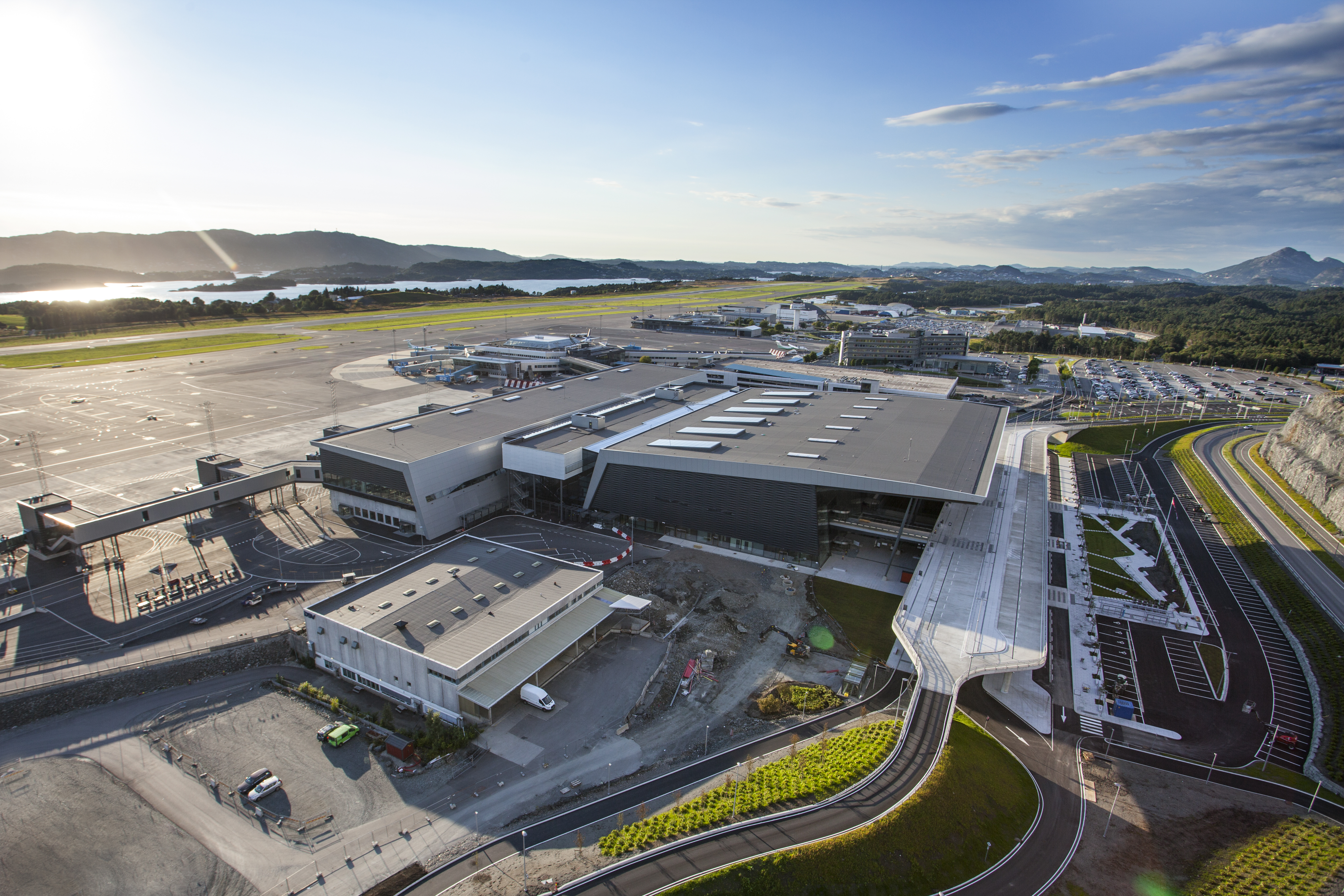

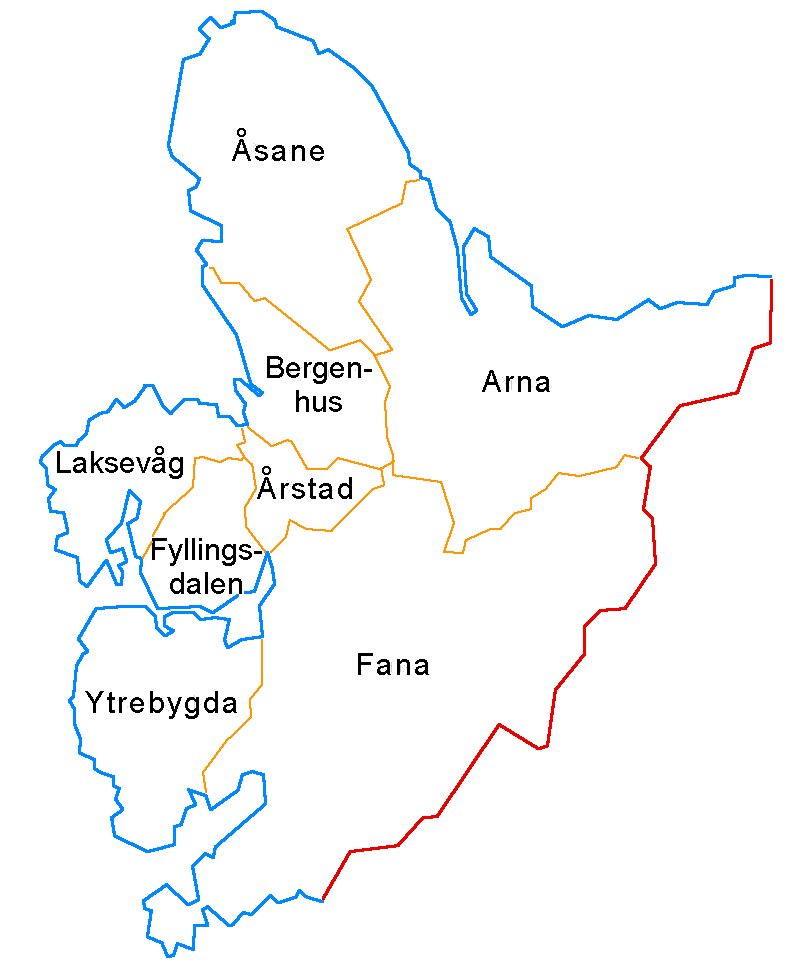
- Map of the 8 boroughs of Bergen
- Coordinates: 60°17′15″N 05°15′39″E
- Country: Norway
- Region: Western Norway
- County: Vestland
- District: Midhordland
- City: Bergen

Area
  - Total: 38.45 km^{2} (14.85 sq mi)
  - Rank: 4th
- 8.6% of total

Population (2014)
  - Total: 26,955
  - Rank: 7th
  - Density: 701.0/km^{2} (1,816/sq mi)
- 9.9% of total
- Time zone: UTC+01:00 (CET)
  - Summer (DST): UTC+02:00 (CEST)
- ISO 3166 code: NO-120106

Ytrebygda is a borough of the city of Bergen in Vestland county, Norway. The borough is the site of Bergen Flesland Airport.

== Location ==
Ytrebygda is located southwest of the city center, south of the Grimstadfjorden and the lake Nordåsvannet. It was originally part of Fana Municipality before Fana was incorporated into Bergen in 1972. Since then, it was part of the borough of Fana until 1990 when it became a separate borough. Ytrebygda borders Fana borough in the east and the Fanafjorden in the south.

Apart from the residential neighborhoods, Ytrebygda has a large office area in the Kokstad and Sandsli area, with large office buildings for companies such as StatoilHydro and Norsk Hydro. The city's airport, Bergen Airport, Flesland, is located in the western part of the borough. Just north of Airport Road is Siljustøl Museum. South of Airport Road is the Bergen Yacht Club (Bergens Seilforening), Golf Club and Fana Stadium. On the far south is Milde Arboretum and Botanical Garden, Fana College (Fana Folkehøgskule), and Store Milde.

Sandsli is a residential and commercial area in the borough of Ytrebygda. The area is part of the industrial area of Sandsli / Kokstad. This is also the districts and shopping center Fanatorget, Aurdalslia school, Skranevatnet school and Sandsli high school.

=== Villages and neighborhoods ===
The villages and neighborhoods in Ytrebygda include: Hjellestad, Søreidgrenda, Milde, and Steinsvik.

== Local attractions ==
- Milde Arboretum and Botanical Garden – 125 acre garden which are planted with a large variety of trees and shrubs
- Siljustøl Museum – Former home of composer Harald Sæverud, managed by the Bergen Art Museum.
- Store Milde – Manor house in the Rococo style of the Renaissance garden

== Picture gallery ==
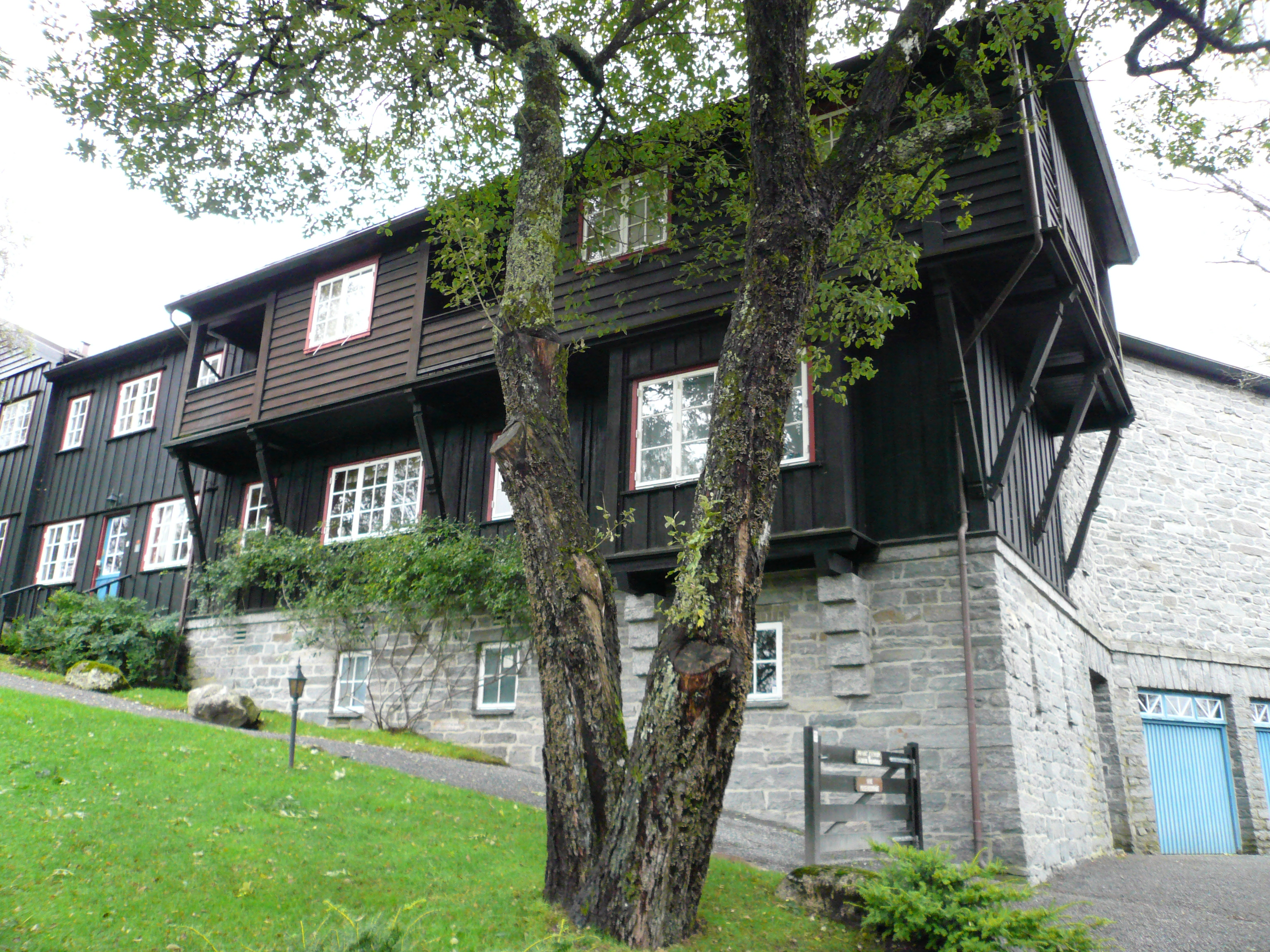
Siljustøl Museum

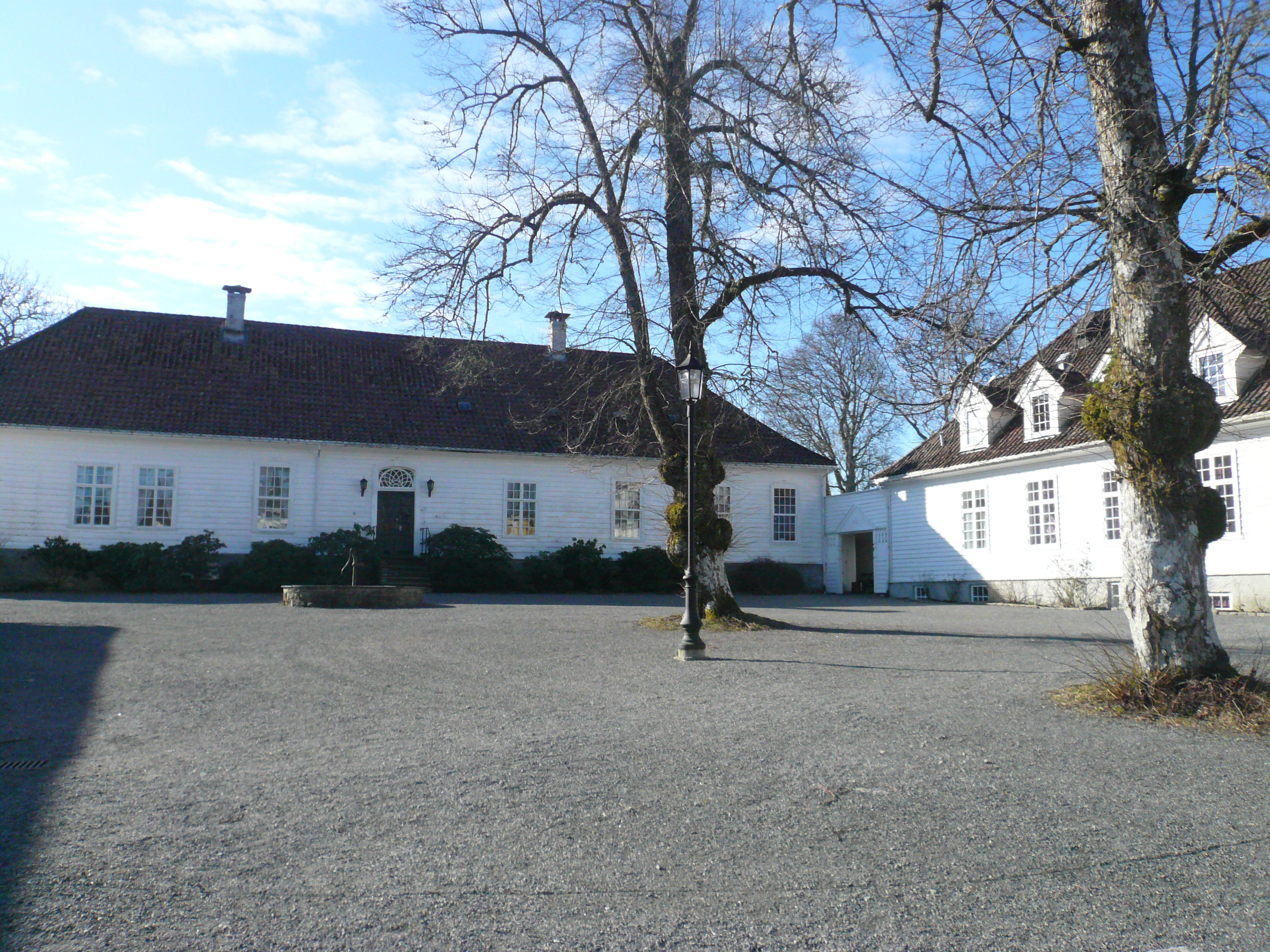
Store Milde Manor

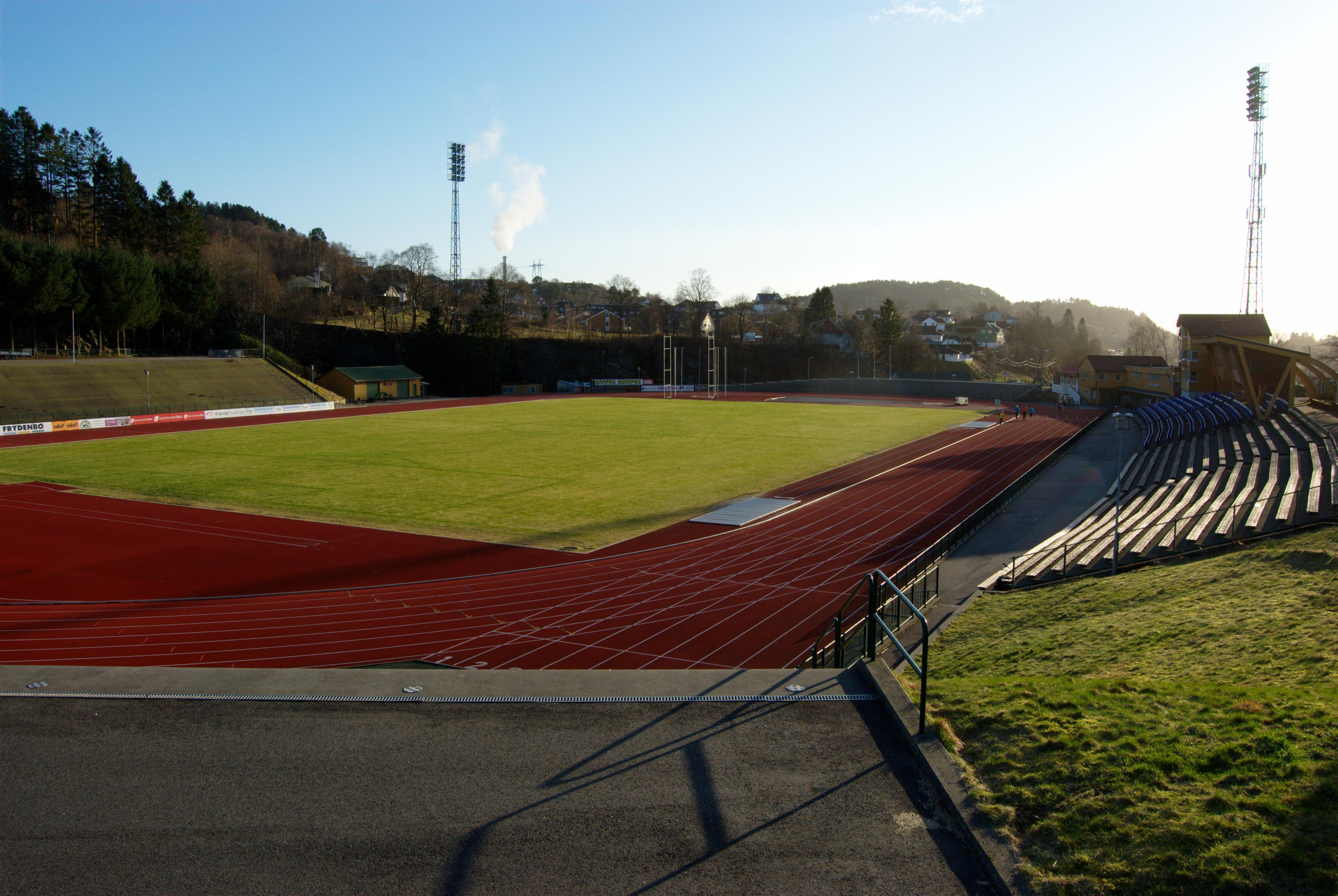
Fana Stadium

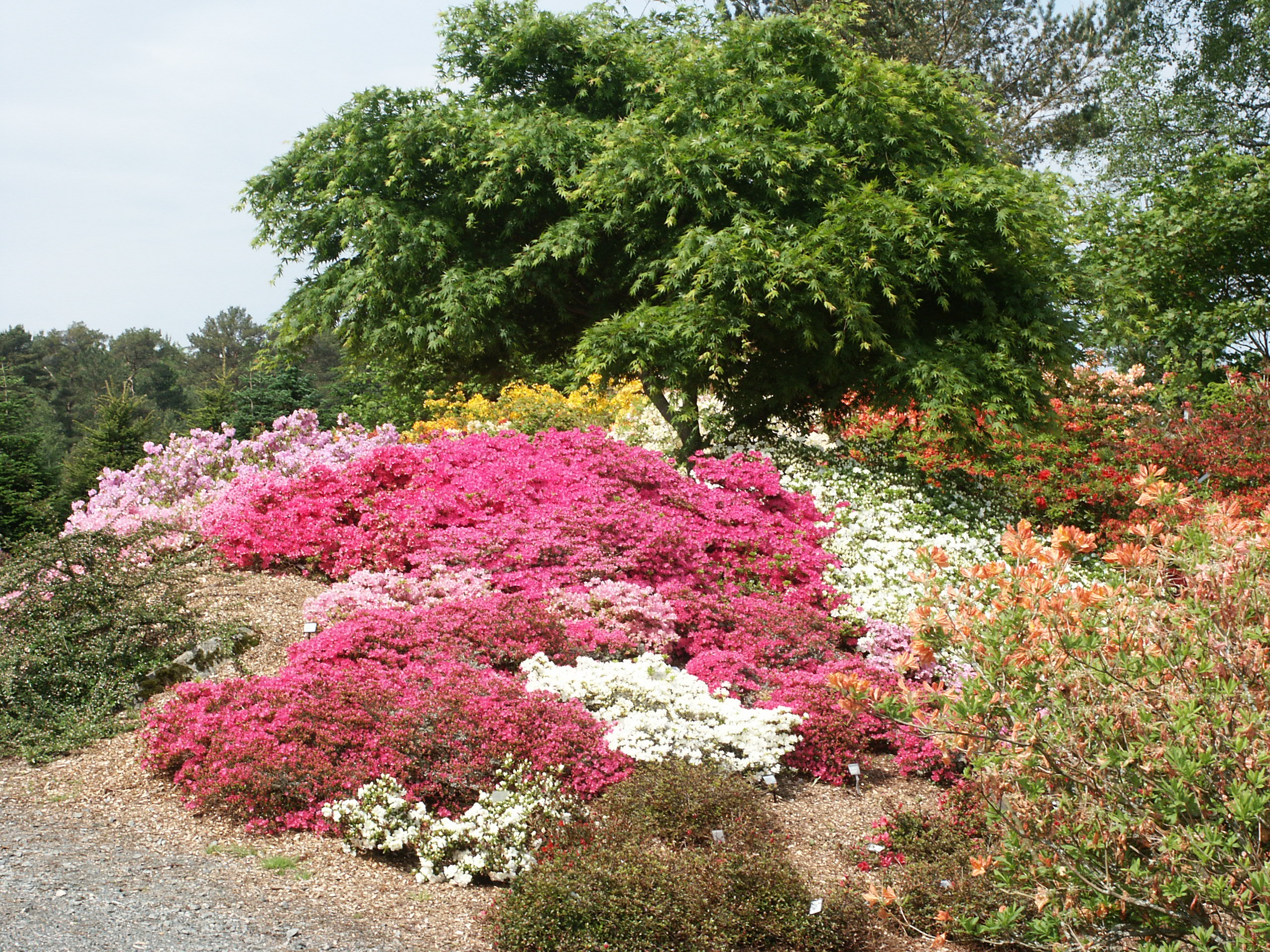
Milde Arboretum and Botanical Garden

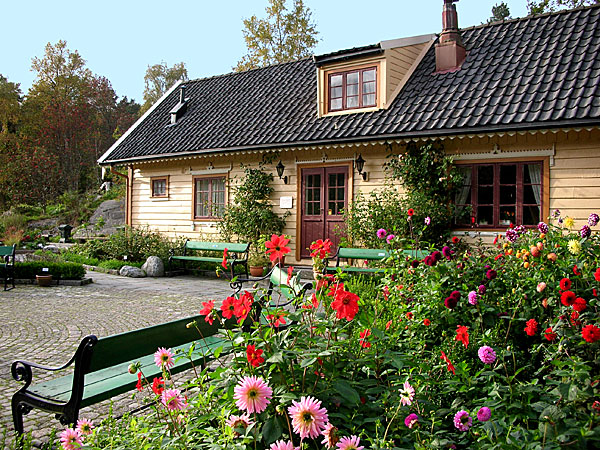
Blondehuset at Milde Arboretum

== Other sources ==
- Hjellestad and Milde and Historical Society (1998). Herregarden Milde. Eigarane gjennom 290 år. 1530–1820; i Liv og lagnad i Neset (in Norwegian).
