= Ole Landmark =

Norwegian architect (1885–1970)

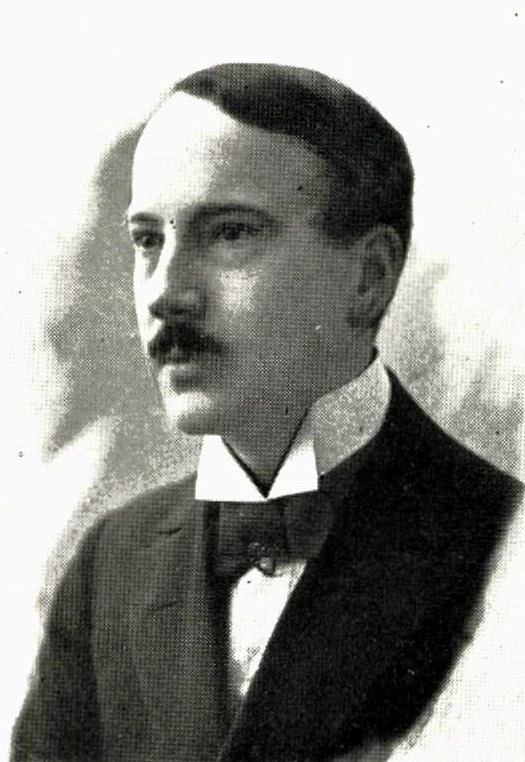
Ole Landmark

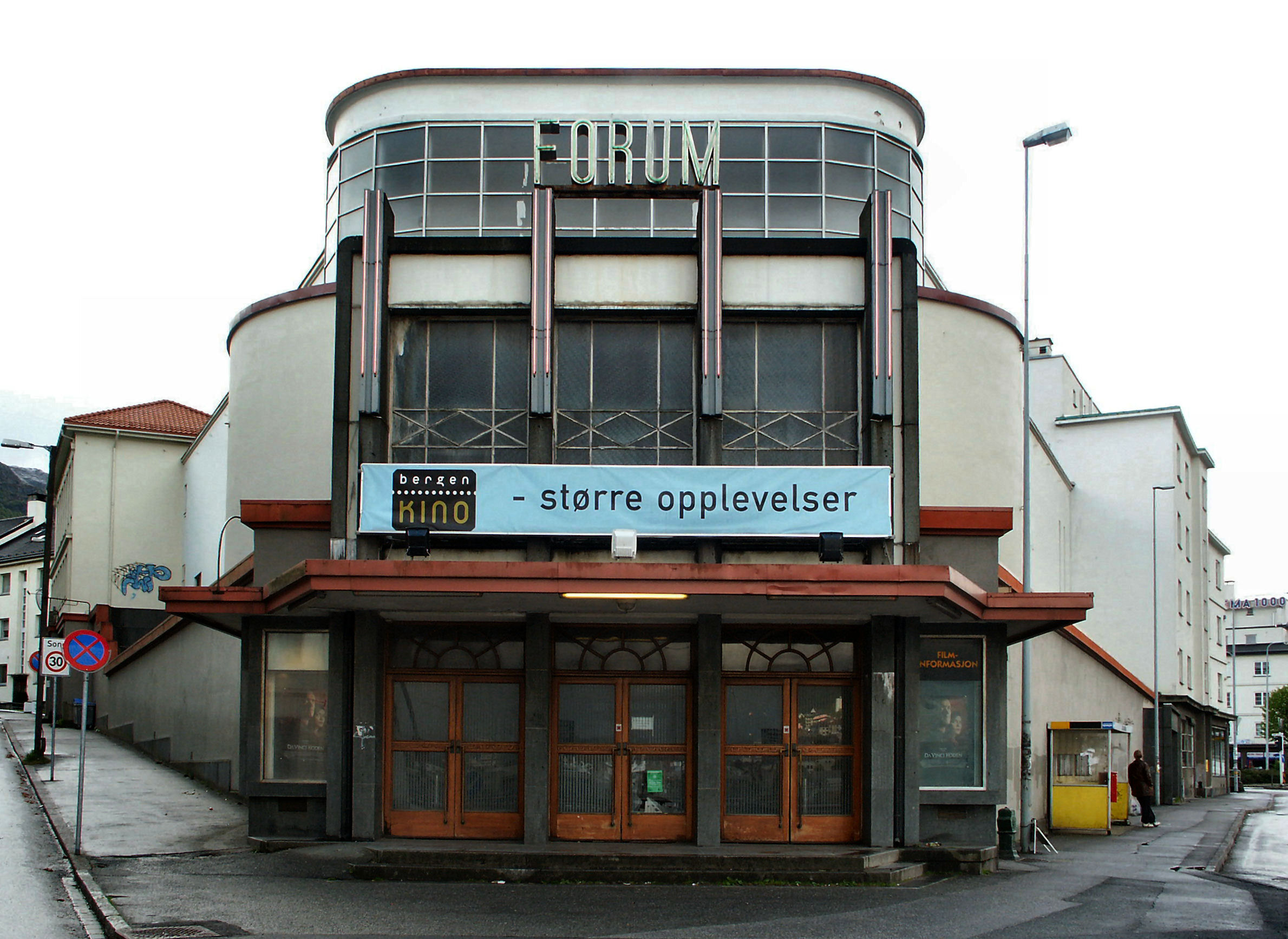
Landmark's functionalist/art deco Forum Kino in Bergen

Ole Landmark (June 15, 1885 – February 7, 1970) was a Norwegian architect. He maintained an architectural firm in Bergen, Norway for nearly 50 years.

== Biography ==
Ole Døsen Landmark was born in Bergen, Norway. He was the son of Johan Petersberg Landmark (1848-1926) and Monsine Dorothea Døsen (1852-1924). He attended the Trondheim Cathedral School and was educated at the Trondhjems Tekniske Læreanstalt, a predecessor of the Norwegian University of Science and Technology. He also made several trips to study abroad, including to Sweden, Germany and France.

He was employed as an assistant for architects Schak Bull and Einar Oscar Schou. He established his own practice in Bergen in 1910. Landmark let himself be inspired by a diverse set of architectural styles throughout his career, including roccoco, Empire style and functionalism. He designed a number of monumental buildings in Bergen, particularly during the period 1925–1940. Among his main works are the gallery building for the Rasmus Meyer Collection (Rasmus Meyers Samlinger). Other notable works include the Forum Kino at Kronstad and Bergen Kunsthall at Lille Lungegårdsvann in the center of Bergen.

Landmark was awarded the Houen Foundation Award in 1925 for his design of Villa Westfal-Larsen in Bergen and during 1932 for his design of Storetveit Church. He was appointed a Knight of the 1st Class Order of St. Olav in 1955 and had several foreign orders and awards

== Selected works ==
- Rasmus Meyers Samlinger, 1924
- Town Hall in Bouchavesnes-Bergen, 1925
- Loddefjord Church, 1926
- Storetveit Church, 1930
- Bergens Kunstforening, 1934
- Florida sykehus at St. Franciskus Hospital, 1937
- Forum kino, 1946

== Restorations ==
- Brødretomten, Bergen
- Store Milde, Bergen
- Thomas Erichsens Minde, Askøy
- Old Åsane Church, Bergen

== Gallery ==
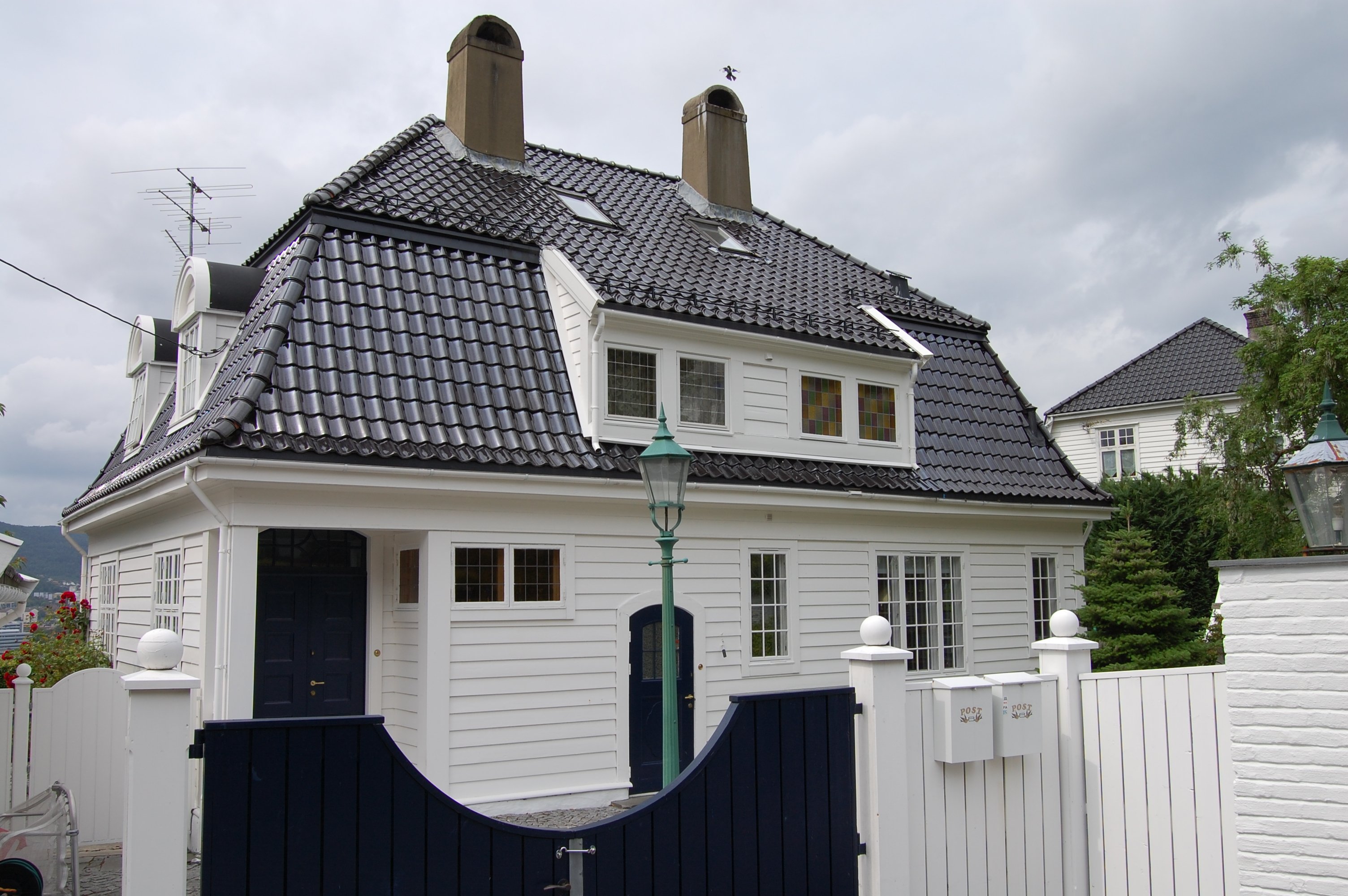
Villa Blaauws (1911)

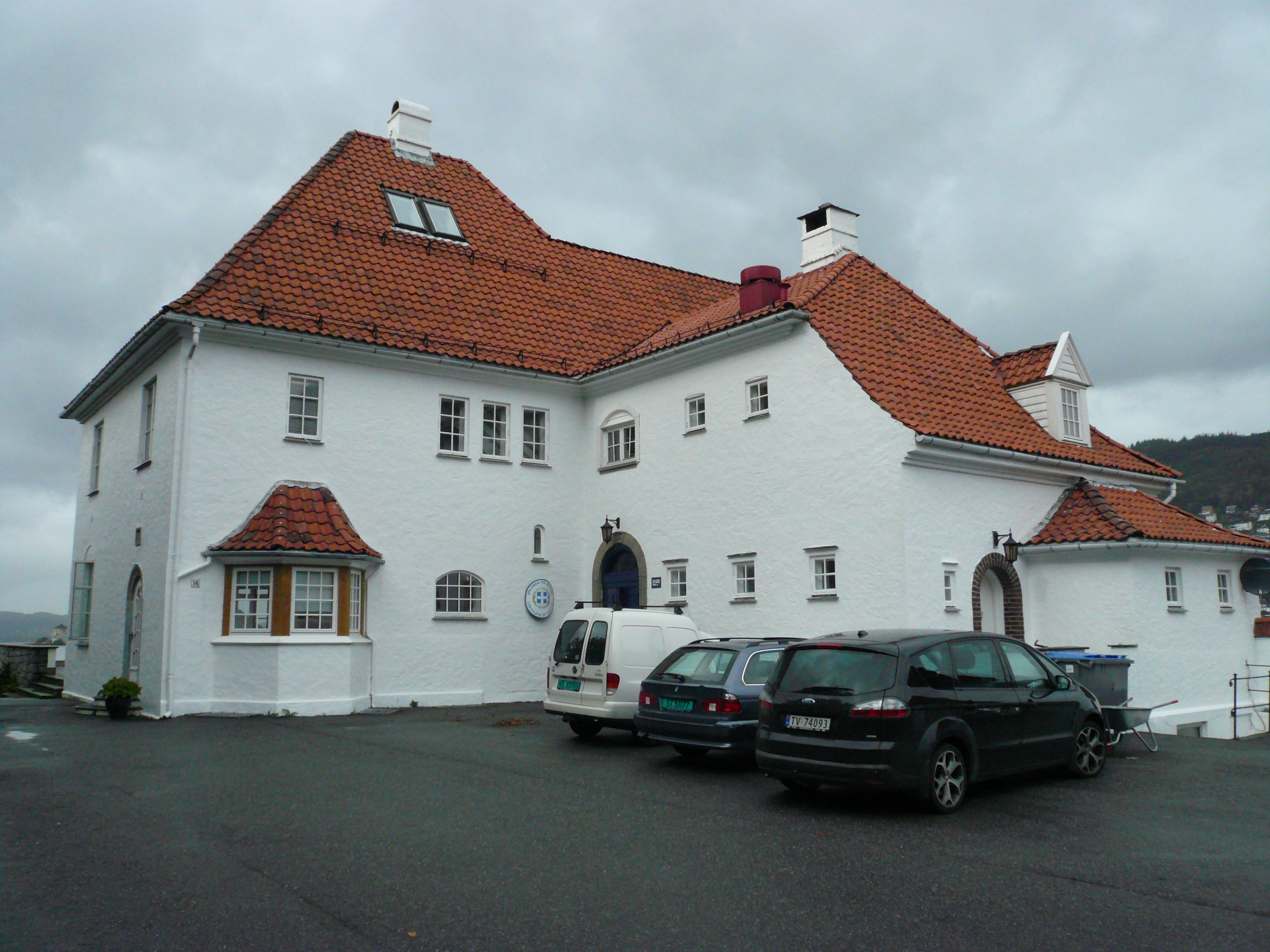
Clementsgaard, Kronstadhøyden (1916)

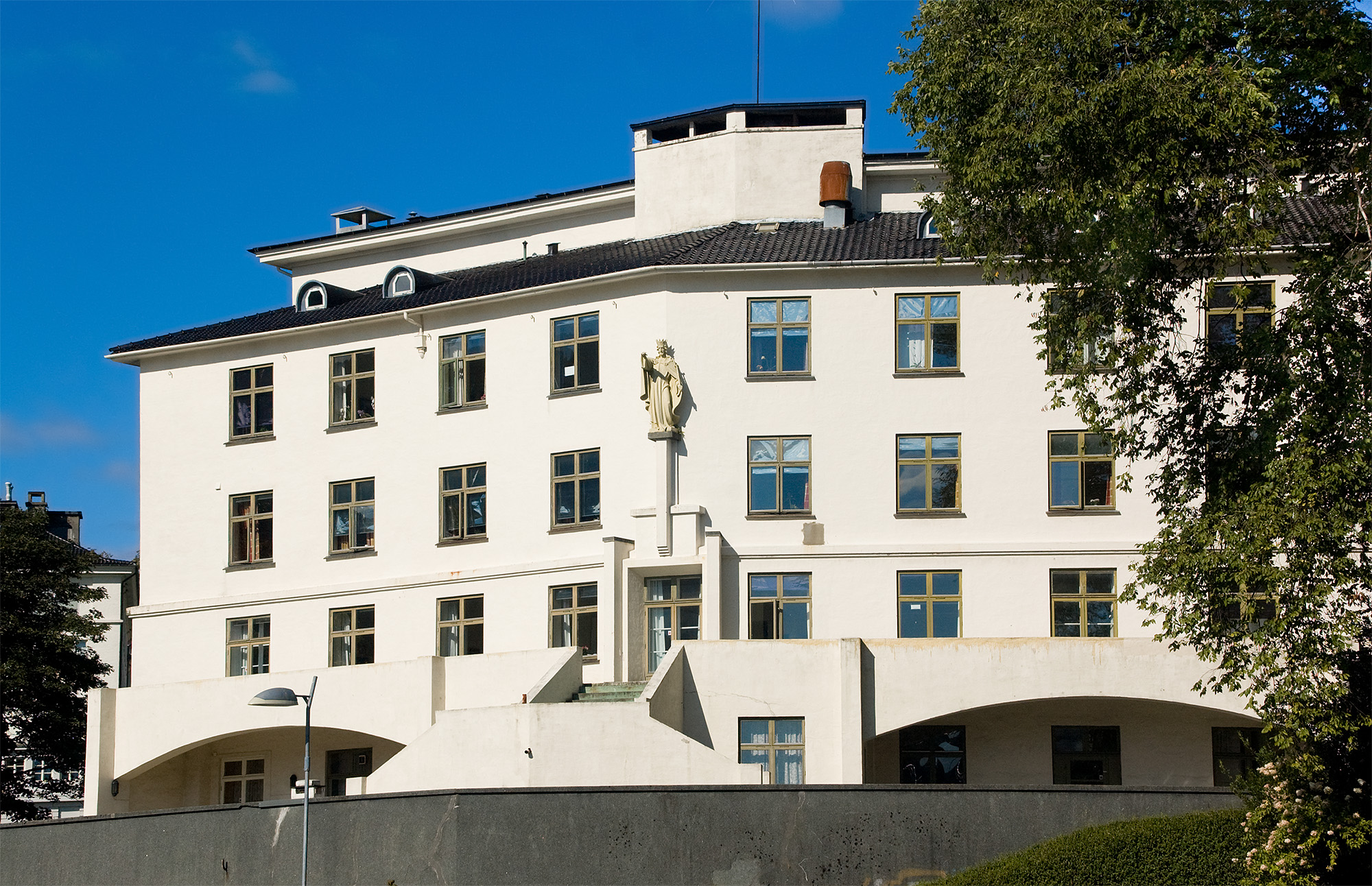
Florida sykehus (1937)

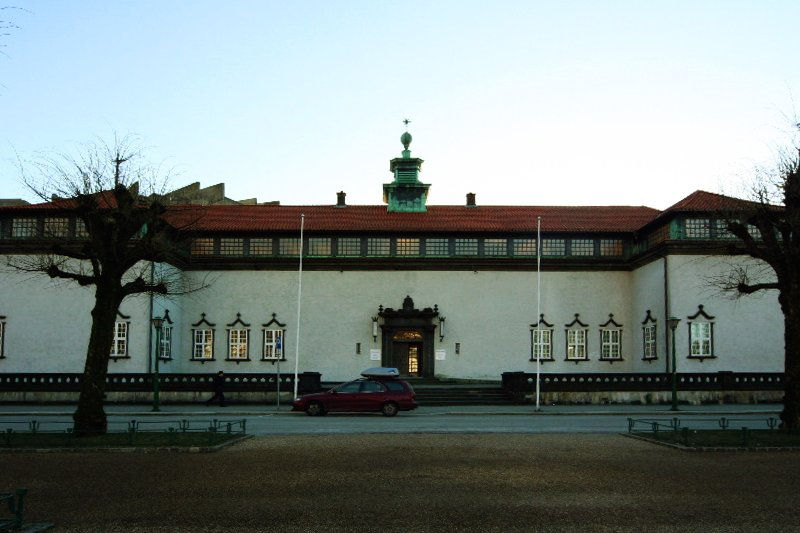
Rasmus Meyers Samlinger (1924)

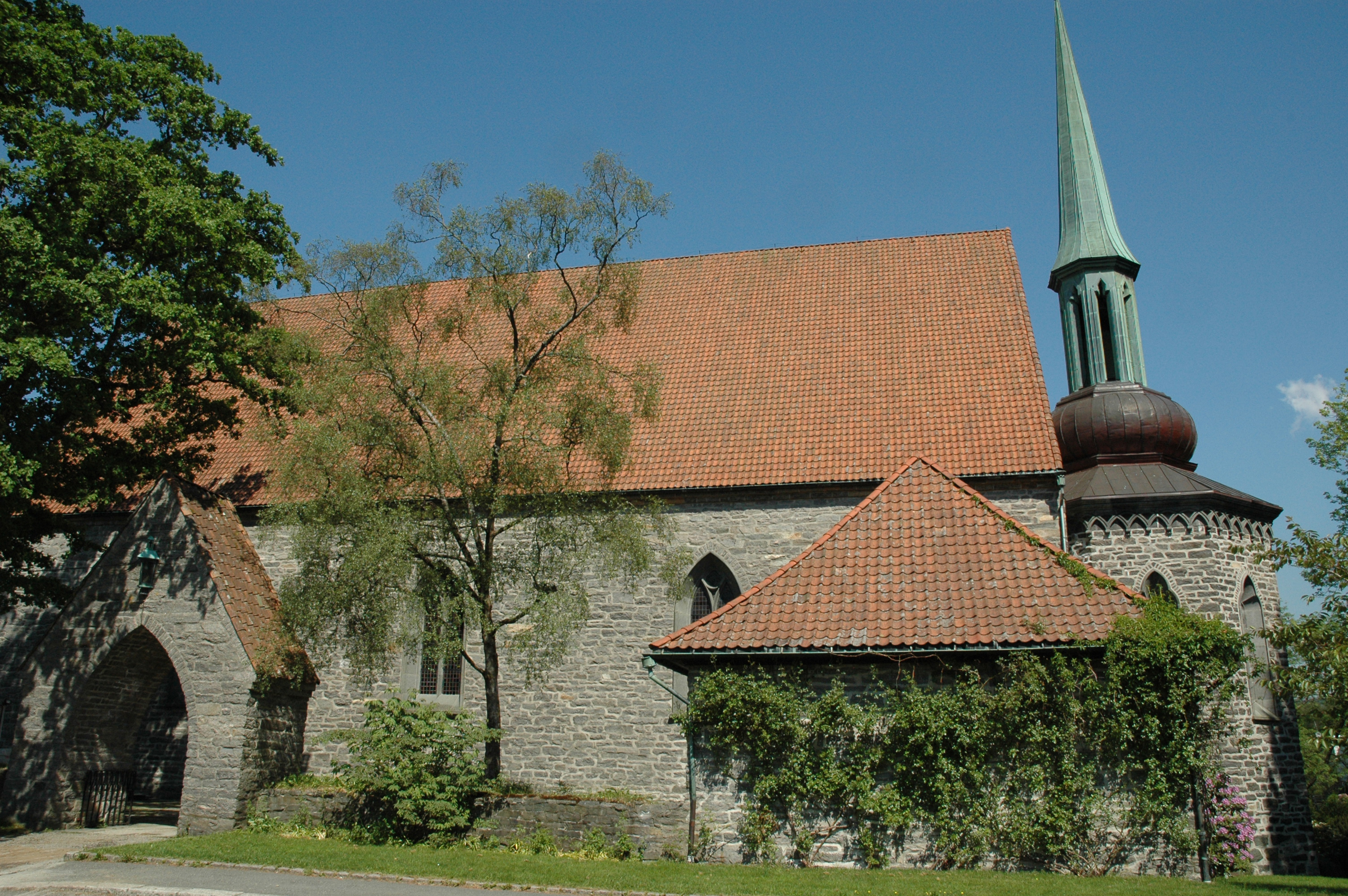
Storetveit Church (1930)
