= Gamlehaugen =

Coordinates: 60°20′33.22″N 5°20′13.05″E

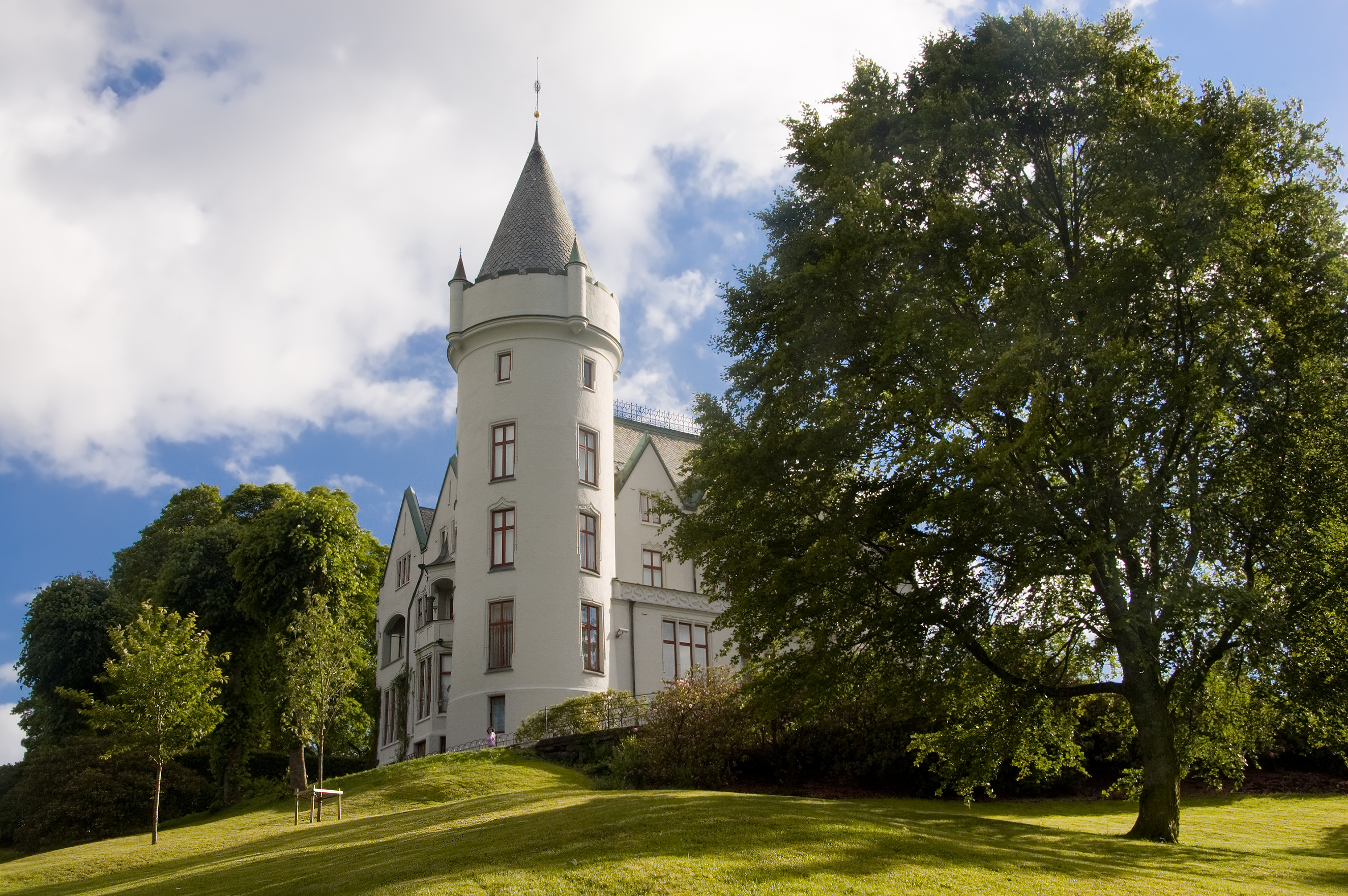
- Gamlehaugen seen from the front
- Interactive map of the Gamlehaugen area

General information
- Architectural style: Scottish baronial style
- Location: Bergen, Norway
- Construction started: 1899
- Completed: 1900
- Client: Christian Michelsen

Design and construction
- Architect: Jens Zetlitz Monrad Kielland

Gamlehaugen is a Royal Castle in Bergen, Norway, and the residence of the Norwegian royal family in the city. Gamlehaugen has a history that goes as far back as the Middle Ages, and the list of previous owners includes many of the wealthiest men in Bergen. Today owned by the Norwegian state, the most recent private owner was Christian Michelsen, a politician and shipping magnate who later became the first prime minister of Norway after the dissolution of the union between Sweden and Norway. Michelsen commissioned the construction of the current main building at Gamlehaugen, where he would live for most of the rest of his life.

When Michelsen died in 1925, his closest friends and colleagues started a national fund-raising campaign that brought in enough money to allow the Norwegian state to purchase the property. The large English park was opened to the public the same year, and the ground floor of the house was opened as a museum two years later. Gamlehaugen has been the Norwegian royal family's residence in Bergen since 1927.

== History ==
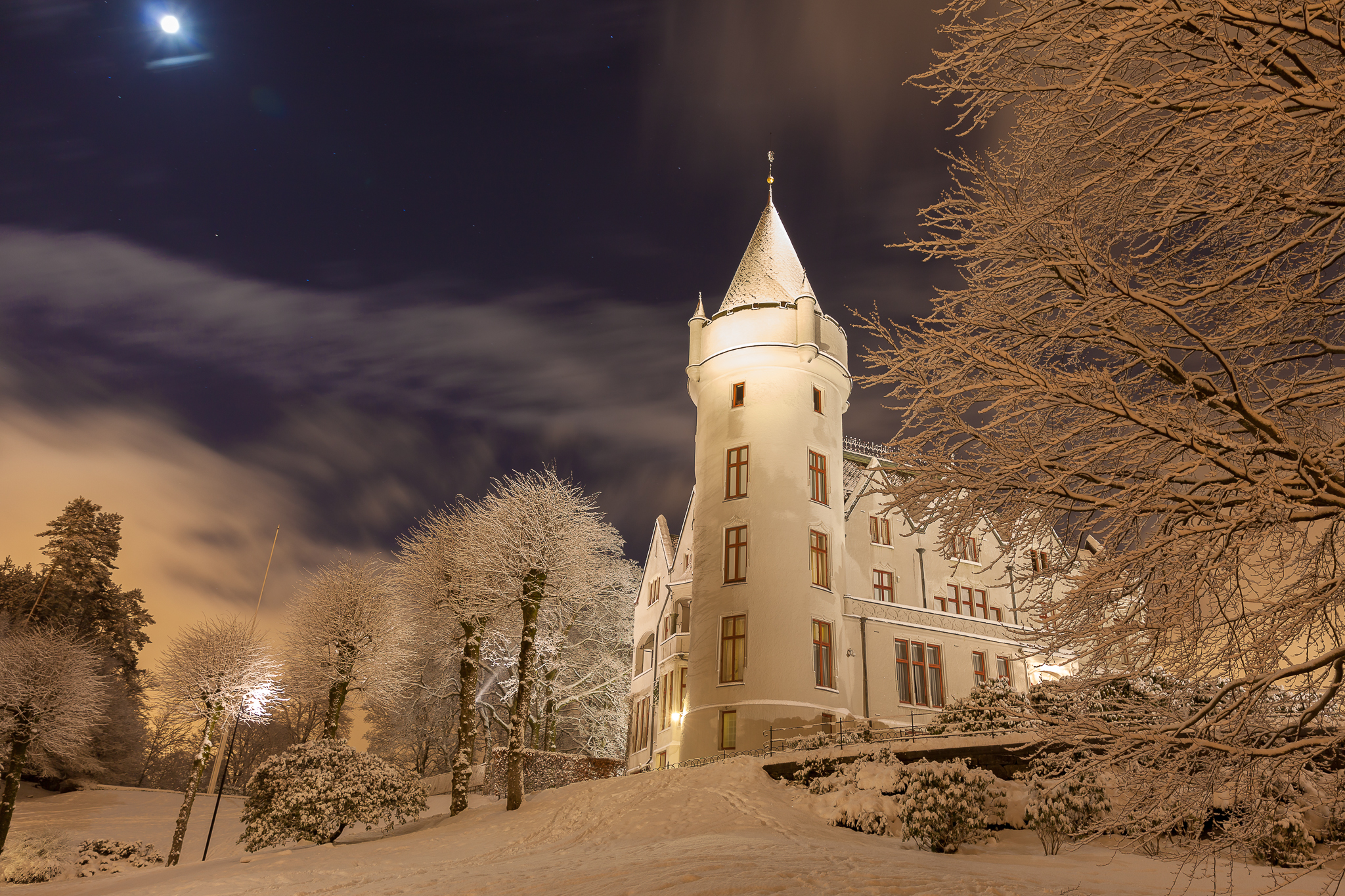
Gamlehaugen castle at night

Gamlehaugen was the site of a farm as early as the Middle Ages, but it was abandoned as a result of the Black Death. In 1665, it once again became farmland, as part of the larger Fjøsanger manor. In 1809, Gamlehaugen was separated from Fjøsanger. Marie Krohn, the niece of Danckert Danckertsen Krohn, who had owned Fjøsanger until his death in 1795, built a mansion at Gamlehaugen. A Schack Stenberg purchased Gamlehaugen in 1838. In 1864, Alexander Bull, the son of the violinist Ole Bull bought the property, however, he sold it to copper smith Ole Andreas Gundersen only two years later. The last owner who operated Gamlehaugen as a farm was the merchant Anton Mohr, who bought it in 1878. When he died in 1890, his widow, Alethe Mohr, sold the property to a pair of artisans from Bergen. However, she was allowed to continue using the property and the main building due to a clausule in the sale contract.

In 1898, Christian Michelsen, a politician and shipping magnate, bought the property. He demolished the existing main building, a Swiss chalet style mansion, and ordered the construction of a new building in the style of a Scottish baronial style castle. The architect was Jens Zetlitz Monrad Kielland, who would later design the Bergen Railway Station and the brick buildings at Bryggen. The construction was finished in 1900, and Michelsen with family moved in the next year. He delegated the task of converting the farmlands surrounding the building into a park to gardener Olav Moen, who designed it as an English park. Barring his years as Prime Minister of Norway from 1905 to 1907, Christian Michelsen lived at Gamlehaugen for the remainder of his life.

=== Royal residence ===
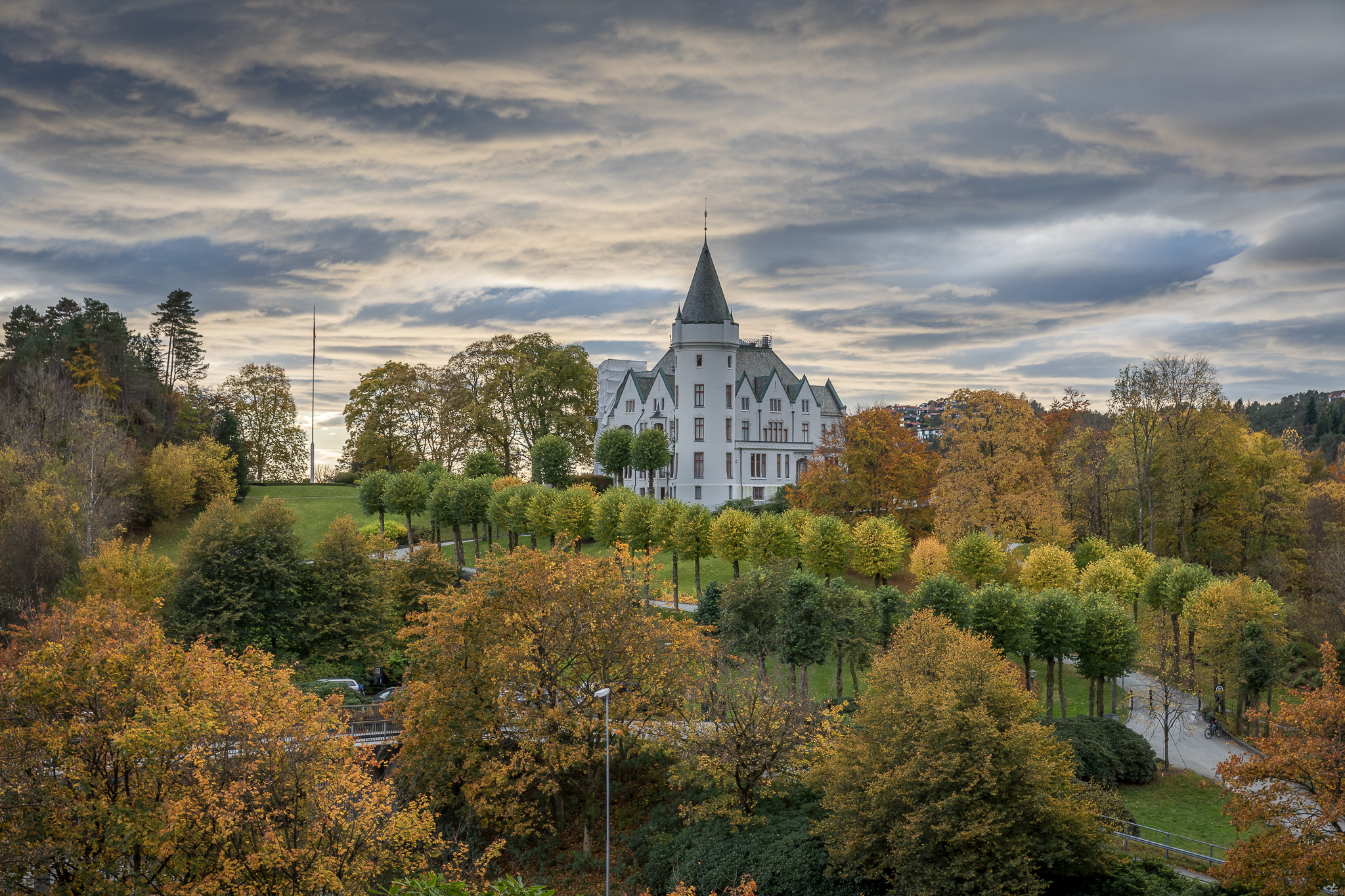

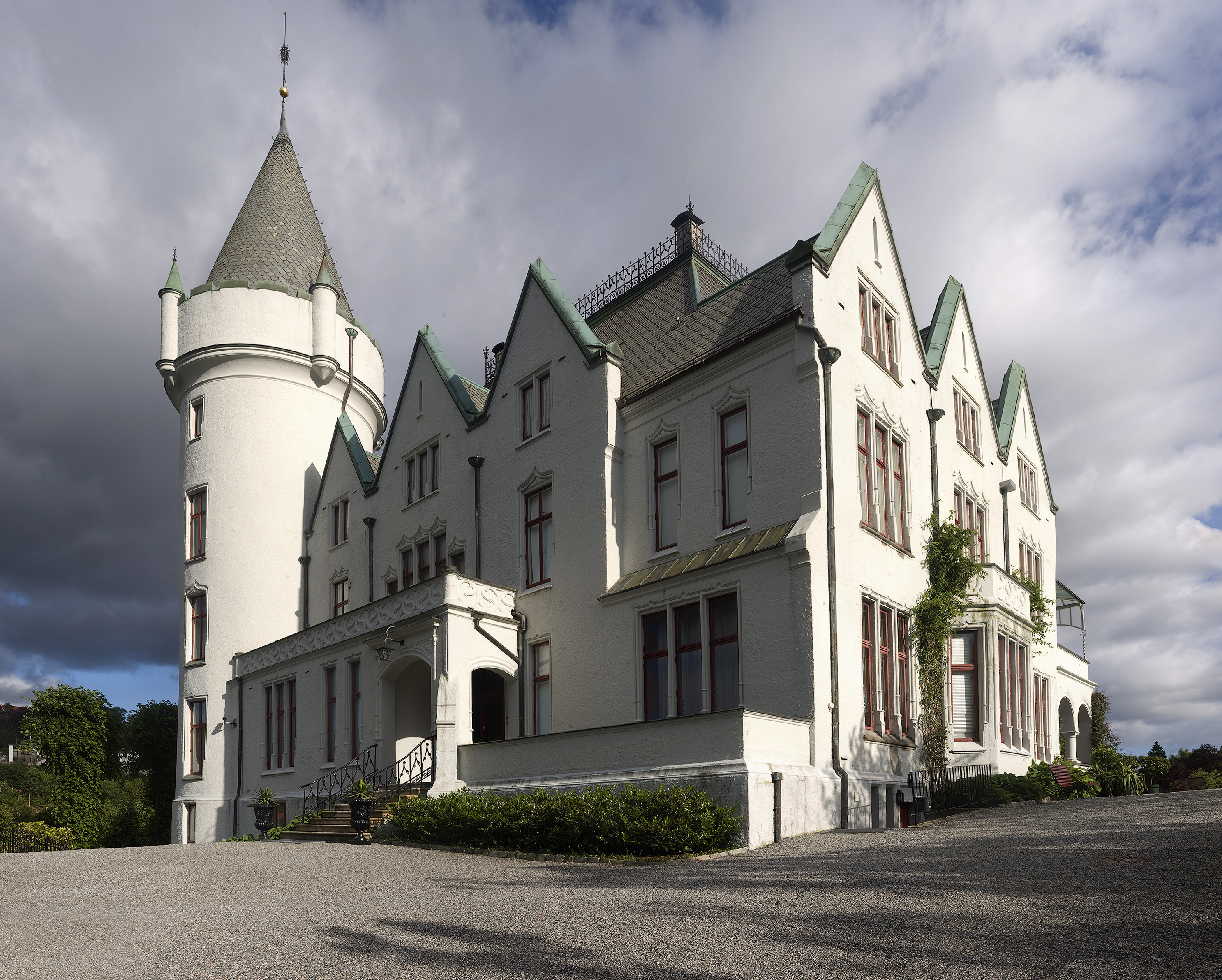
The main building seen from the north-west.

Following Michelsen's death in 1925, his closest friends and colleagues initiated a national fund-raising campaign which sought to collect the money needed for the state to purchase Gamlehaugen, as well as create a fund to pay for the costs of operation and maintenance. While the campaign did not raise the goal of one million krone, the state did nevertheless buy the property. The fund eventually ran dry, and the state has paid for the upkeep since 1965. Gamlehaugen was renovated between 1989 and 1991 in preparation for Harald V and Queen Sonja's first visit as king and queen consort. Haakon, Crown Prince of Norway resided at the mansion while he attended the Royal Norwegian Naval Academy in the 1990s.

== Park ==
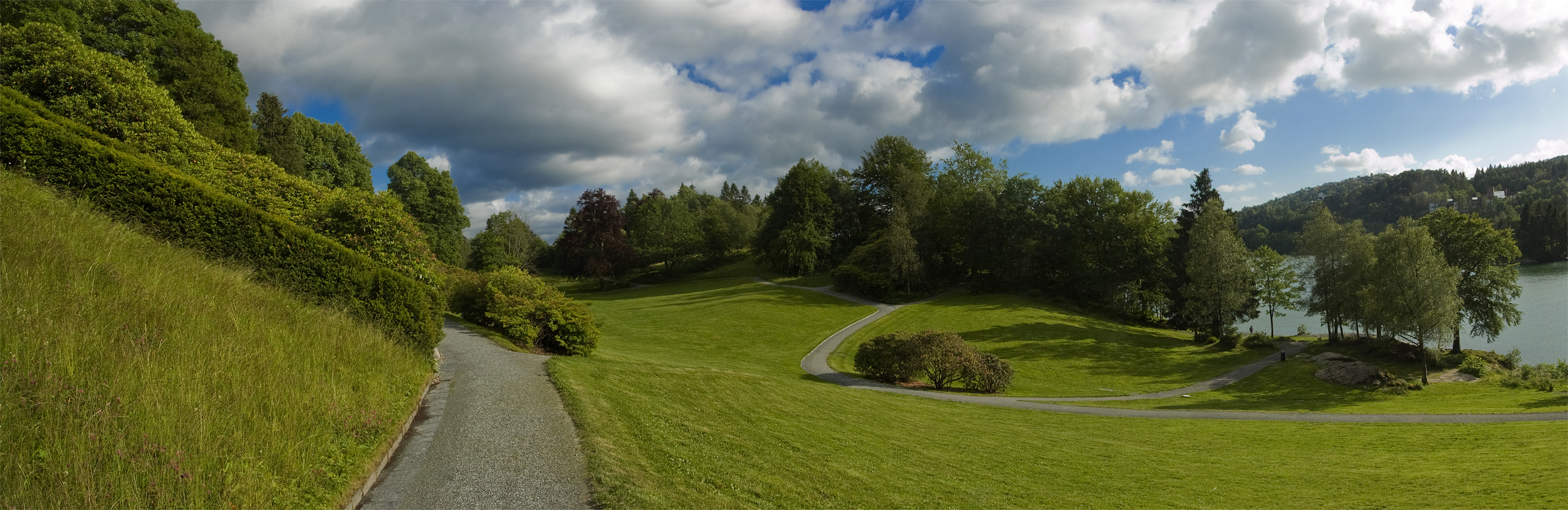
The park on a quiet day, June 2008

Prior to Christian Michelsen's acquisition of Gamlehaugen, most of the property was used as farmland. Michelsen gave the task of converting it into a large park to gardener Olav Moen, who later became a professor at the Norwegian University of Life Sciences. Moen wanted a park dominated by evergreen plants and trees, however Michelsen's wish for a fruit garden won out in the end. The park was designed as an English garden, adhering to the natural lines and curves of the landscape. The avenue which today leads from the main road to the mansion is a baroque element, unfamiliar to the garden as a whole.

The park has been open to the public since the state acquired it in 1925. The fruit trees and bushes which were planted when the park was first laid out all died soon after, but the park still contains many of the original trees, several of which are from before Christian Michelsen acquired Gamlehaugen. The park is still a popular recreation ground, especially due to its location next to Nordåsvannet, which allows for bathing and other water activities.

== Other buildings ==
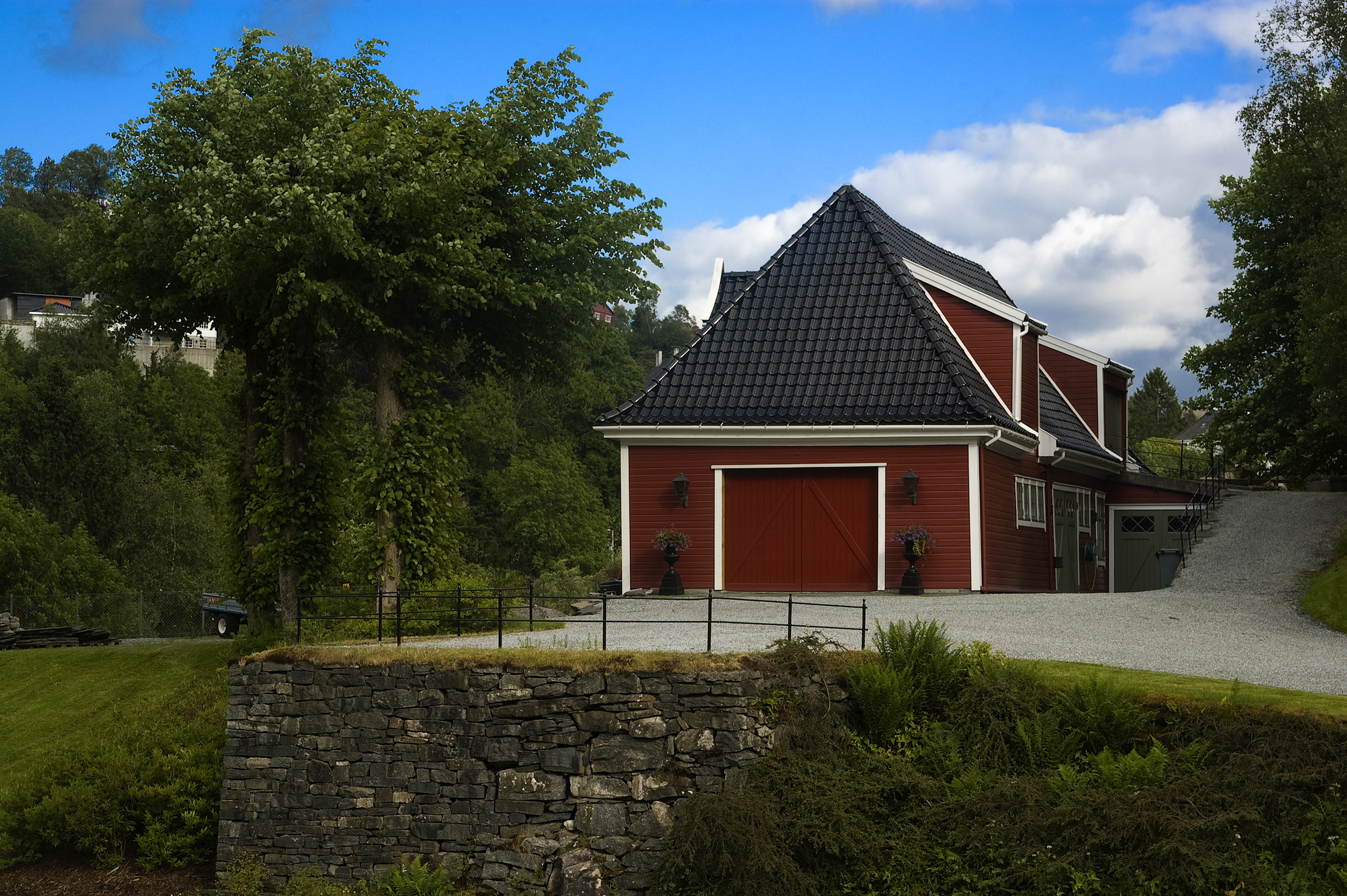
The stable

The stable is a red building located next to the road. It was originally located near the caretaker's house, which had to be demolished in 1986 when the rock it was built on was blasted away to make room for the widening of the main road. Directly west of the stable is an unused root cellar. Further west, on the other side of the main building, is a greenhouse, currently used by the janitorial crew. While the greenhouse is relatively small, a larger greenhouse is known to have existed at some point during the time Michelsen was the owner of Gamlehaugen. Finally, a boathouse, built c. 1900, can be found by the waterside in the far north of the property. The property originally contained several additional buildings; the most recent ones to be demolished, apart from the caretaker's house, are a gardener's house, demolished in 1972, and a bath house, demolished in the 1950s, both of which stood by the waterside.
