= Bergen Kunsthall =

Museum in Bergen, Norway

Coordinates: 60.3897°N 5.3265°E

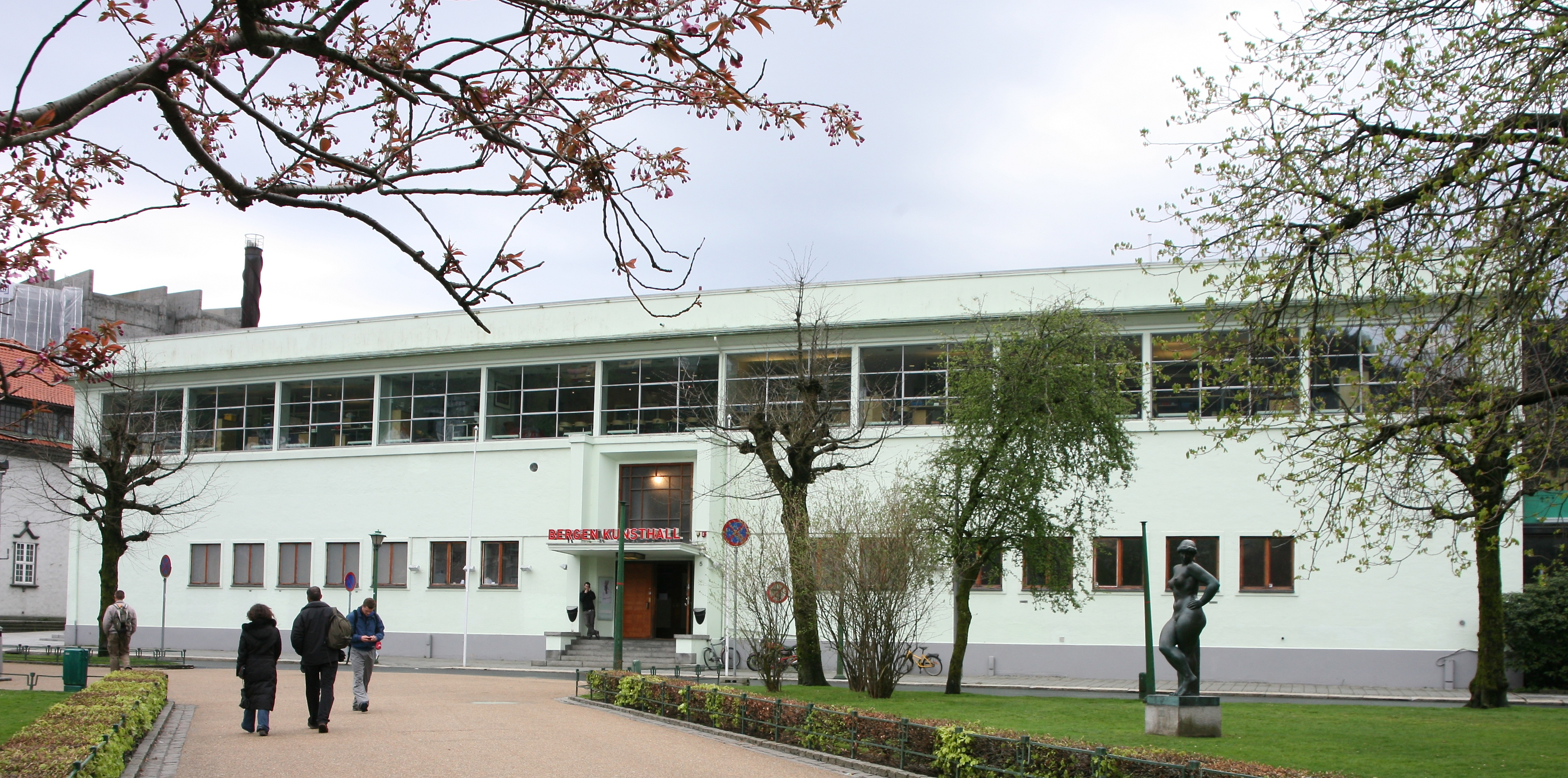
Bergen Kunsthall in 2008

Bergen Kunsthall is a contemporary art centre in Bergen, Norway, that organises and hosts exhibitions and events by both Norwegian and international artists. Since 1953, Bergen Kunsthall has curated and produced the annual Festspillutstillingen, which is now regarded as one of Norway’s most prestigious solo exhibitions.

Their 2017 exhibition "BRIDGIT" by Charlotte Prodger won the Turner Prize in 2018.

Bergen Kunsthall was originally founded in 1838 as Bergens Kunstforening, and is located in an early functionalist building designed in 1935 by the architect Ole Landmark.
