= Grimstadfjorden =

Fjord in Vestland, Norway

- Grimstadfjord (unofficial)
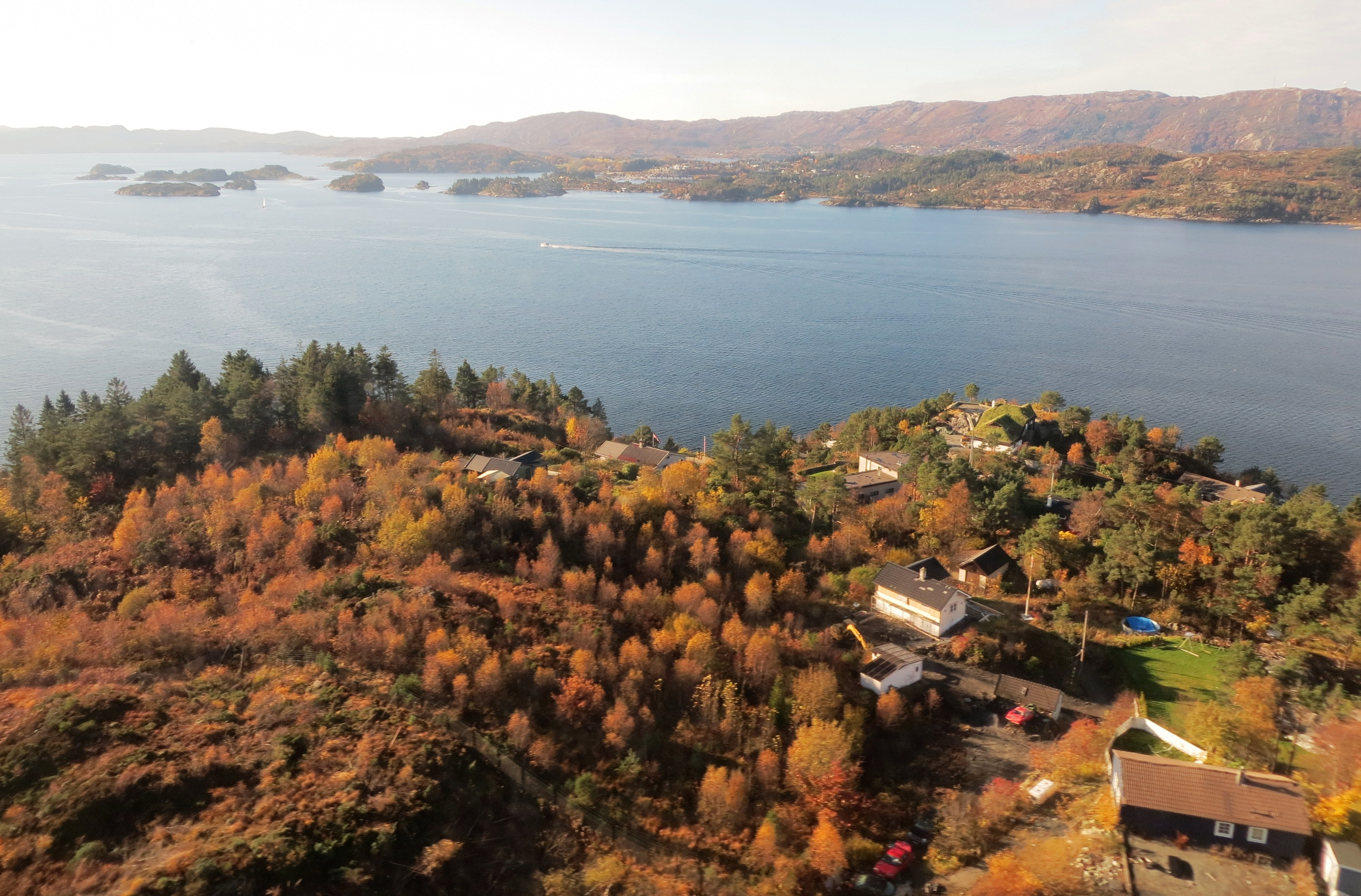
- View of the fjord
- Interactive map of Grimstadfjorden
- Location: Vestland county, Norway
- Coordinates: 60.32555°N 5.21679°E
- Type: Fjord
- Primary inflows: Nordåsvannet
- Primary outflows: Raunefjorden
- Basin countries: Norway
- Max. length: 4 kilometres (2.5 mi)

Grimstadfjorden is a small fjord in Bergen Municipality in Vestland county, Norway. It is located about 8 kilometres (5.0 mi) southwest of the centre of the city of Bergen. The 4-kilometre (2.5 mi) long fjord lies on the western side of the Bergen Peninsula, and it divides the Laksevåg and Ytrebygda boroughs of the city of Bergen.

Grimstadfjorden lies just north of Bergen Airport, Flesland and the Norwegian naval base Haakonsvern lies on the northern shore of the fjord. The lake Nordåsvannet flows to the west into this fjord and then this fjord flows west into the large Raunefjorden. The island of Bjorøyna lies at the western mouth of Grimstadfjorden.

== History ==
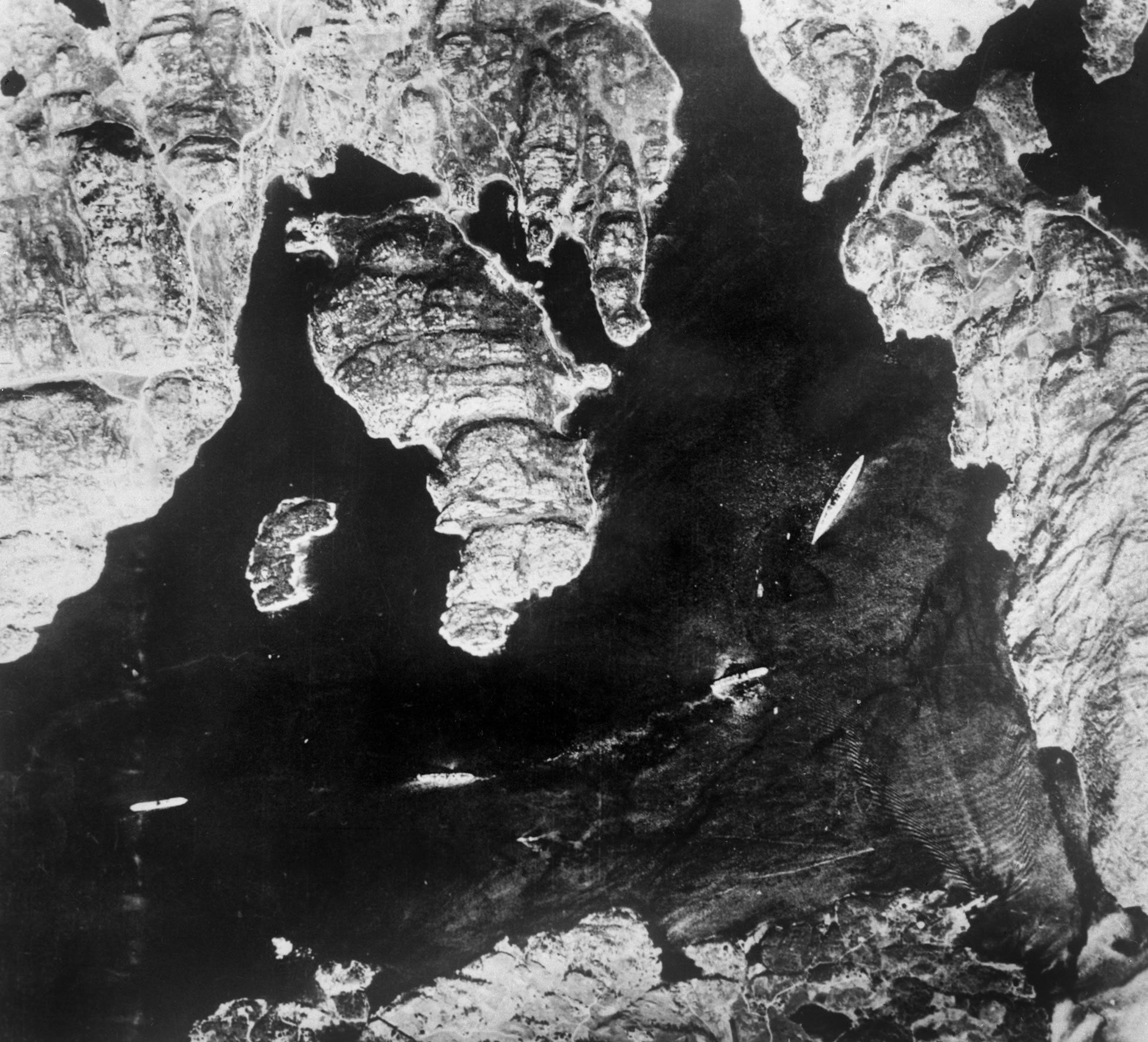
Aerial reconnaissance photo taken by Flying Officer Michael Suckling of the Bismarck anchored in Grimstadfjord, Norway

The German battleship Bismarck was moored here on 21 May 1941.
