= Siljustøl =

Museum in Bergen, Norway

Coordinates: 60°17′38″N 5°18′29″E

Siljustøl is a museum situated in the borough of Ytrebygda in Bergen, Norway. It was previously the home of composer and musical artist Harald Sæverud and his wife Marie Hvoslef.

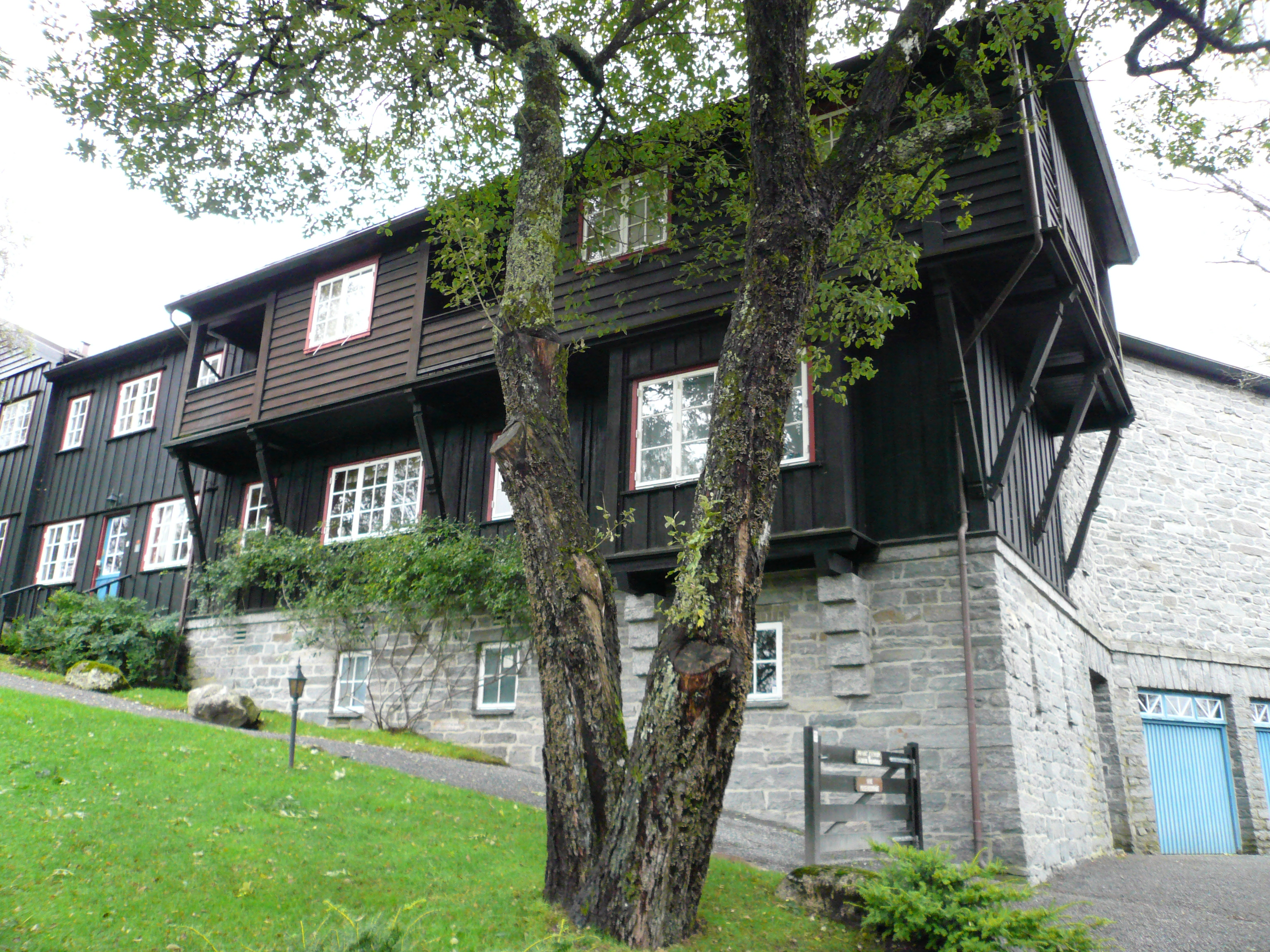
Harald Sæverud Museum Siljustøl

== History ==
Harald Sæverud (1897–1992) and Marie Hvoslef (1900–1982) had received the property as a wedding gift from her mother, Madsella Steen Hvoslef, when they married in 1934. Marie Hvoslef was the daughter of sea captain and ship broker, Frederik Waldemar Hvoslef (1861–1926) and granddaughter of Church of Norway Bishop, Waldemar Hvoslef. The composer and his wife moved into Siljustøl upon completion of the residence in 1939.

The main building at Siljustøl was designed by architect Ludolf Eide Parr in cooperation with Sæverud. To preserve nature as intact as possible, Sæverud chose to place the house on the outskirts of the currently 176-acre property. Originally he envisioned a yard with many small houses around it. Thus for Sæverud was a mountain farm the world center, half natural, half cultural. Sæverud was inspired by old storehouses and farmhouses from Telemark and Setesdal. He wanted it simple and beautiful. The timber should be naked so that the wood found. Walls should not be sanded and with oblique angles which gave more life to the rooms.

In 1984 the property and part of the house was bequeathed to a foundation with the name "Marie Hvoslef and Harald Sæverud Foundation for the promotion of Norwegian music and the visual arts". This foundation according to the will, would ensure "Siljustøl to retain its allure as mountain farm". In 1993, the property and museum part of the house was transferred to Bergen municipality. Museum and concert activities are placed under the Edvard Grieg Museum Troldhaugen. The museum works partly to promote knowledge of the life and music of Harald Sæverud.

Harald Sæverud Museum Siljustøl was officially opened in connection with Sæverud's 100th birthday on 17 April 1997. The grand piano in Sæverud's study and his personal belongings were placed as he left them when he died. The adjacent outdoor area was an important inspiration for Sæverud's creative activity. Today, the property with its many hiking trails are open to the public. The museum is open on Sundays during the summer and offers concerts related to Sæverud birthday and other occasions.

== See also ==
- List of music museums
