= Harald Sæverud =

Norwegian composer (1897–1992)

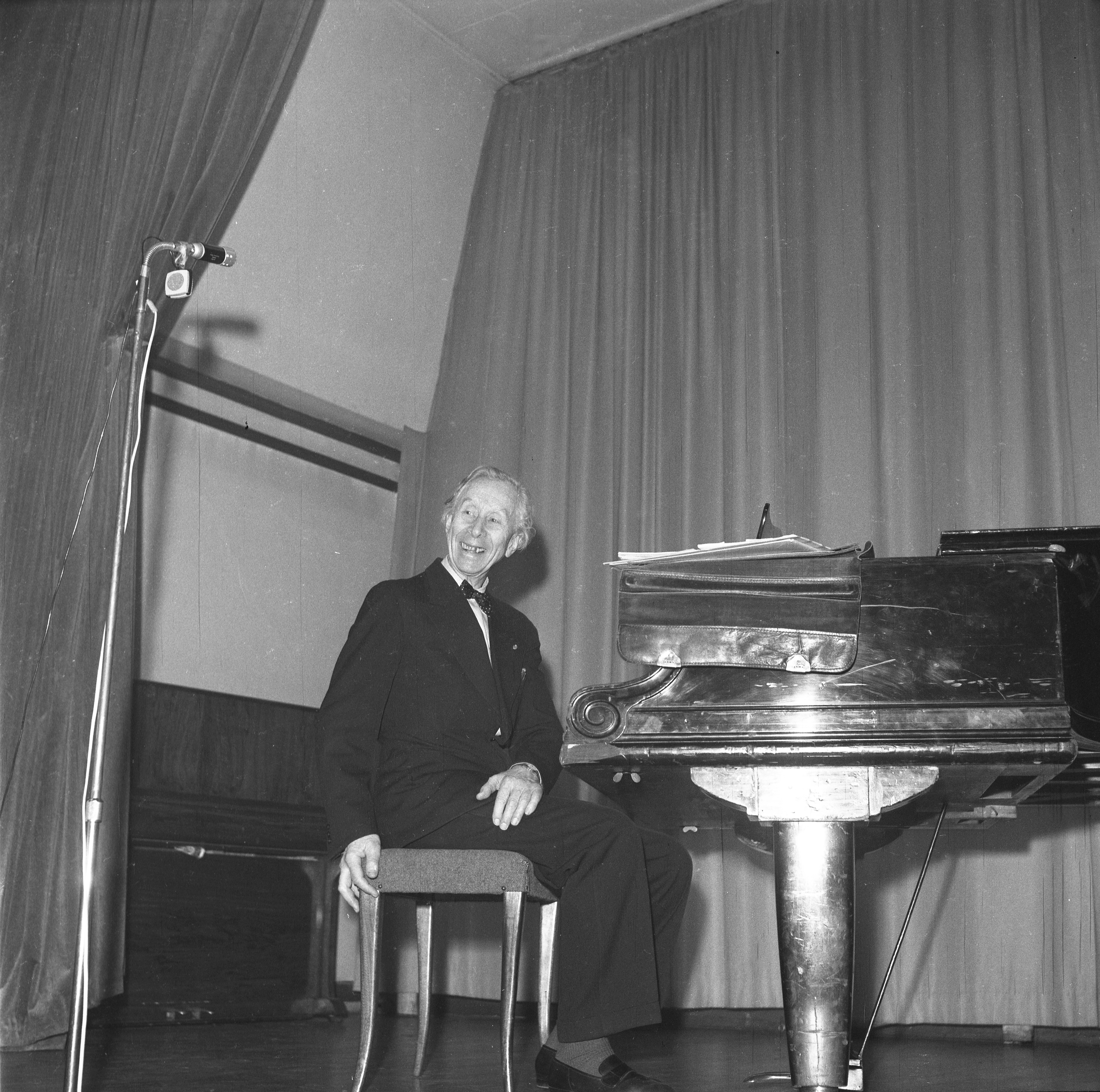
- Sæverud in 1967
- Born: 17 April 1897; Bergen, Norway
- Died: 27 March 1992 (aged 94)
- Occupation: Composer
- Children: Ketil Hvoslef (son)

Harald Sigurd Johan Sæverud (17 April 1897 – 27 March 1992) was a Norwegian composer. He is most known for his music to Henrik Ibsen's Peer Gynt, Rondo Amoroso, and the Ballad of Revolt (Norwegian: Kjempeviseslåtten). Sæverud wrote nine symphonies and a large number of pieces for solo piano. He was a frequent guest conductor of his own works with the Bergen Philharmonic Orchestra.

== Background and early career ==
Harald Sæverud was born in Bergen and received his basic music education at the local conservatory where his teacher was the Leipzig-educated composer Borghild Holmsen. During his conservatory years he began working on what would become his first symphony, outlined as two large symphonic fantasies. The first fantasy was completed in 1919 and was accepted for performance in Kristiania (later Oslo) in 1920. It revealed an extraordinary talent and gained him a scholarship for further studies at the Staatliche Hochschule für Musik, where Friedrich Koch was his teacher for two years. In Berlin, Sæverud completed the final part of his first symphony; this new section was premiered by the Berlin Philharmonic Orchestra. The performance was conducted by his friend Ludwig Mowinckel, who had hired the orchestra to present a concert dedicated to modern Norwegian music. The critics were mostly favorable to Sæverud's symphony, and this further raised his interest for symphonic and orchestral music.

Harald Sæverud moved back to his hometown of Bergen in 1922, where he stayed, with few exceptions, for the rest of his life. His earliest compositions are coloured by a late Romantic musical style, but later he developed a personal idiom, often based on classical forms inspired by composers like Joseph Haydn and Wolfgang Amadeus Mozart. But his neoclassicism could often possess dissonant and strong expression. How he has utilized this is commented on by musicologist Lorentz Reitan: "His symphonies, for example, are studies in musical form: Thematic/motive development in accordance with the material's own rules and logic. Classic forms such as sonatas and fugue are for him, to a larger extent, overriding principles rather than forms to be filled out, and his circling around musical constructions often gives his music an abstract quality" (Cappelens Musikkleksikon).

== Bergen ==
In the 1930s Harald Sæverud and his American-born wife Marie Hvoslef built a magnificent mansion on the outskirts of Bergen. It was named Siljustøl, and the family moved there in 1939. Their son is the composer Ketil Hvoslef. The composer came now into close contact with nature, which had a very strong impact on him and his compositions. His compositions turned towards a more Norwegian and "greener" style. In 1940 Nazi Germany invaded Norway. From this point, Sæverud's compositions became weapons against the occupying army. His main compositions from the period are the three "War symphonies": no. 5, Quasi una fantasia, no. 6, Sinfonia Dolorosa, and no. 7, Psalm. Also from this period comes his direct protest against the Nazis: Ballad of Revolt in versions for both piano and orchestra.

In contrast to these strong compositions he also shaped a number of lyric piano pieces inspired by nature and Norwegian folk music (he never borrowed directly from folk music) published in collections called Tunes and Dances from Siljustøl and Easy Pieces for Piano.

== Post-war ==
After the war, Sæverud was considered to be the doyen of Norwegian composers and he gained wide popularity for a number of his compositions. Particularly noteworthy from his later years are his incidental music for Ibsen's Peer Gynt (1948), his symphonies no. 8, Minnesota (1958), and no. 9 (1966), the ballet Count Bluebeard's Nightmare, and concertos for piano, violin, and bassoon. During the two last decades of his long life the orchestra composer suddenly developed an interest in chamber music, and produced, among other works, three string quartets and two woodwind quintets.

Harald Sæverud was widely famous for his humour, mainly of a grotesque kind. "I was born on a graveyard," he said, and it is a fact that the ground under the house where he was born was both a former graveyard and a place of execution. He was convinced that his mother's nightmares there had influenced him both as a person and composer: "My music is terribly melancholy--wildly melancholy."

Besides his humour, his uniqueness as a composer is palpable. The English conductor Sir John Barbirolli said: "Whether you like Sæverud's music or not, there is never any doubt about who has written it, and this can be said about very few composers today."

== Honours ==
Sæverud's central place in Norwegian and European music has resulted in a number of honorary awards: He received the State Guaranteed Income for Artists from 1955 until his death. He became an honorary member of the music society Harmonien (the Bergen Philharmonic Orchestra) in 1957, and was awarded their gold medal. Also in 1957, he became a knight in the Royal Norwegian Order of St. Olav, and 20 years later became a commander in the same order. In 1979, he received the Arts Council Norway Honorary Award. He has also received awards from Sweden, Finland, Yugoslavia, and England.

== Death ==
Harald Sæverud died in Bergen on 27 March 1992. The funeral ceremony, which took place in the Grieg Hall in Bergen, was broadcast by the Norwegian Broadcasting Corporation.

== Works ==
- Mozart-Motto Sinfonietta (1971)

Awards
Preceded by Olav Dalgard	Recipient of the Norsk kulturråds ærespris 1979	Succeeded by Sonja Hagemann
