= Nordåsvatnet =

Fjord in Vestland, Norway

- Nordåsvannet (unofficial); Fjøsangerfjorden (unofficial)
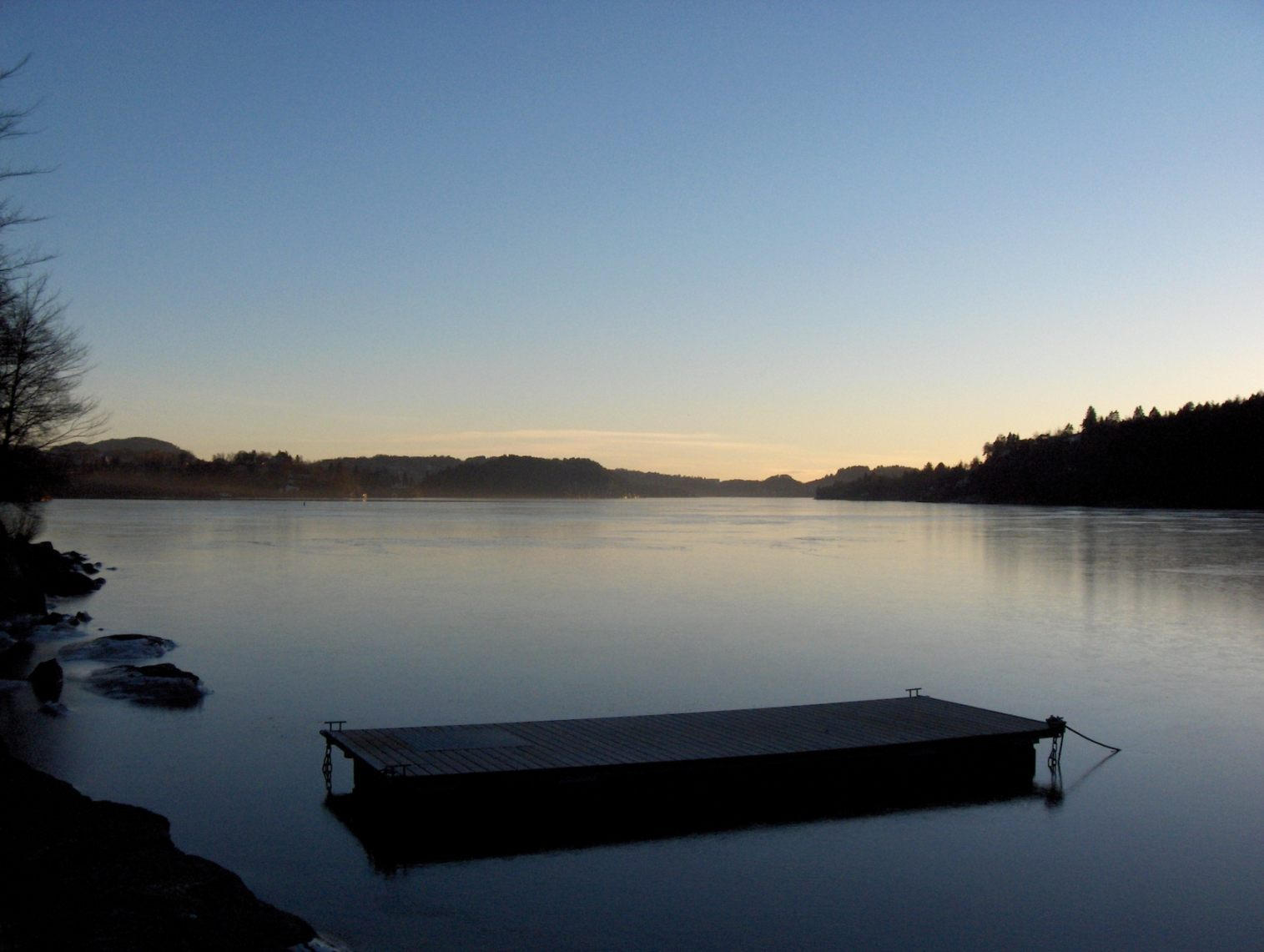
- View of Nordåsvannet
- Interactive map of Nordåsvatnet
- Location: Vestland county, Norway
- Coordinates: 60.31977°N 5.31004°E
- Type: Fjord
- Primary outflows: Grimstadfjorden
- Basin countries: Norway
- Max. length: 11 kilometres (6.8 mi)
- Surface area: 5 km^{2} (1.9 sq mi)

Nordåsvatnet is a bay in Bergen Municipality in central Vestland county, Norway. Located about 10 kilometres (6.2 mi) south of the centre of the city of Bergen, it separates the boroughs of Fana and Ytrebygda from the borough of Fyllingsdalen. Nordåsvannet has an area of about 5 square kilometres (1.9 sq mi), and is connected to the Grimstadfjorden at its far western end. The entire fjord, consisting of the Grimstadfjorden and Nordåsvannet, is locally known as the Fjøsangerfjorden. It is approximately 11 kilometres (6.8 mi) long.

The Bergen neighborhoods of Søreidegrenda, Nesttun, Paradis, Fjøsanger, Bønestoppen, and Straume are all located on the shores of Nordåsvatnet. The Gamlehaugen mansion is located on the shores of the bay. Gamlehaugen is one of the Norwegian King's royal residences.

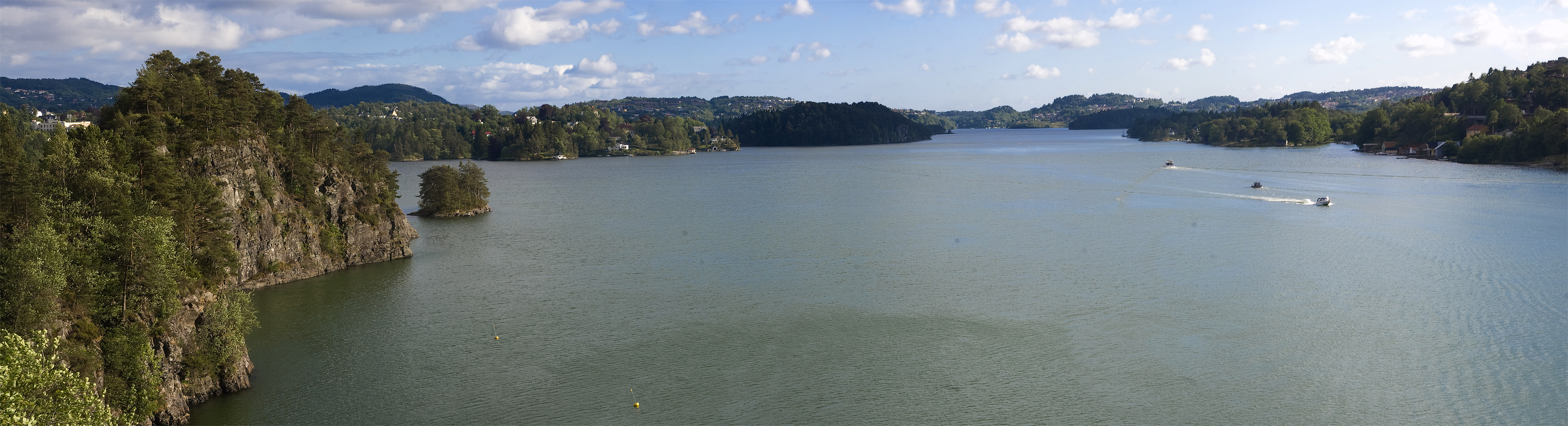
View of Nordåsvatnet seen from Gamlehaugen (north)
