= Wilhelm Mohr =

Wilhelm Mohr may refer to:

- Wilhelm Mohr (aviator) (1917–2016), Norwegian aviation officer
- Wilhelm Mohr (politician) (1886–1978), Norwegian landowner and politician
- Wilhelm Mohr (journalist) (1838–1888), German journalist
