= Fana Municipality =

Former municipality in Hordaland, Norway

Fana Municipality Fana kommune
- Former municipality
- Fane herred (historic name)
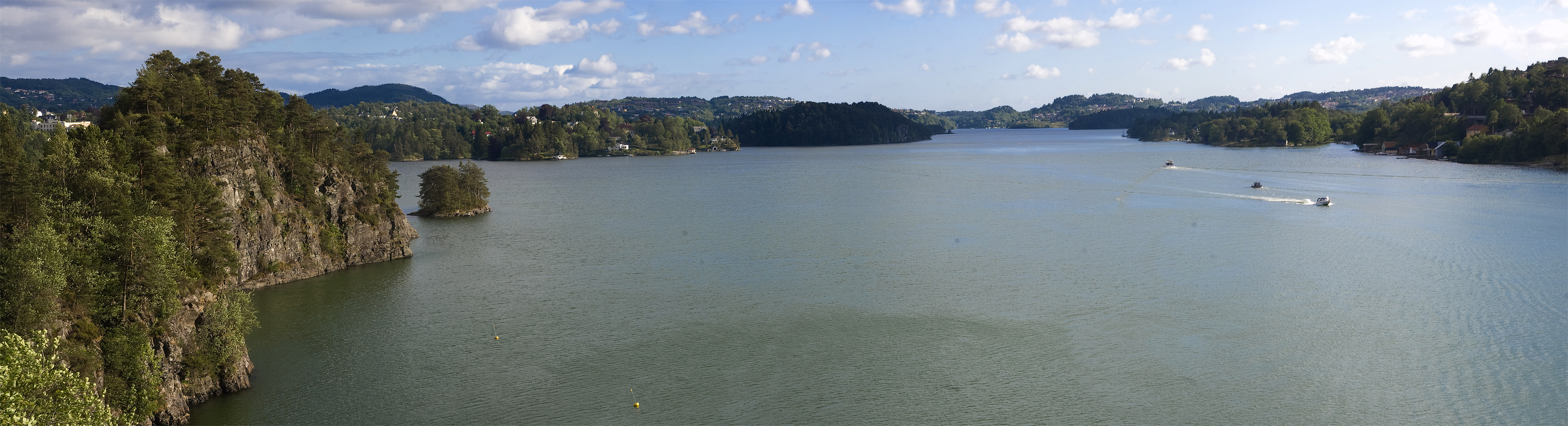
- View of Nordåsvannet seen from Gamlehaugen (north)

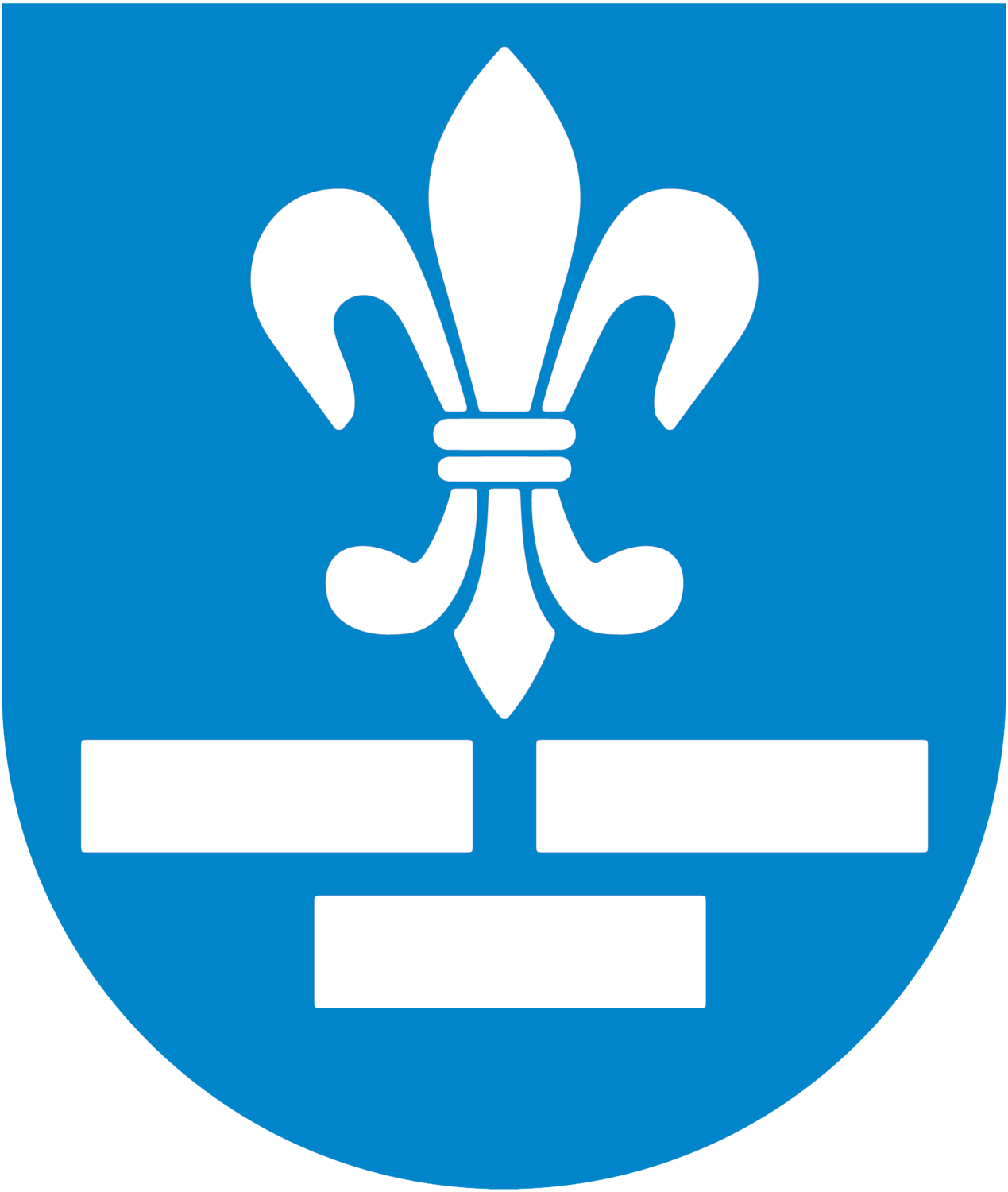
- Coat of arms

- Hordaland within Norway

- Fana within Hordaland
- Coordinates: 60°18′58″N 05°21′15″E
- Country: Norway
- County: Hordaland
- District: Midhordland
- Established: 1 Jan 1838
  - Created as: Formannskapsdistrikt
- Disestablished: 1 Jan 1972
  - Succeeded by: Bergen Municipality
- Administrative centre: Nesttun

Government
  - Mayor (1959–1971): Jacob L. Berstad

Area (upon dissolution)
  - Total: 205.2 km^{2} (79.2 sq mi)
  - Rank: #324 in Norway
- Highest elevation: 914 m (2,999 ft)

Population (1971)
  - Total: 44,059
  - Rank: #9 in Norway
  - Density: 214.7/km^{2} (556/sq mi)
  - Change (10 years): ▲ +30.7%
- Demonym: Fanabu

Official language
  - Norwegian form: Neutral
- Time zone: UTC+01:00 (CET)
  - Summer (DST): UTC+02:00 (CEST)
- ISO 3166 code: NO-1249

Fana is a former municipality in the old Hordaland county, Norway. The 205.2-square-kilometre (79.2 sq mi) municipality existed from 1838 until its dissolution in 1972. The area is now part of Bergen Municipality in the traditional district of Midhordland in Vestland county. The administrative centre was the village of Nesttun. The municipality encompassed the present-day boroughs of Fyllingsdalen, Ytrebygda, and Fana, as well as the southern part of the borough of Årstad all south of the city centre of Bergen. The historic Fana Church was the main church for the municipality.

Prior to its dissolution in 1972, the 205.2-square-kilometre (79.2 sq mi) municipality was the 324th largest by area out of the 449 municipalities in Norway. Fana Municipality was the 9th most populous municipality in Norway with a population of about 44,059. The municipality's population density was 214.7 inhabitants per square kilometre (556/sq mi) and its population had increased by 30.7% over the previous 10-year period.

== General information ==
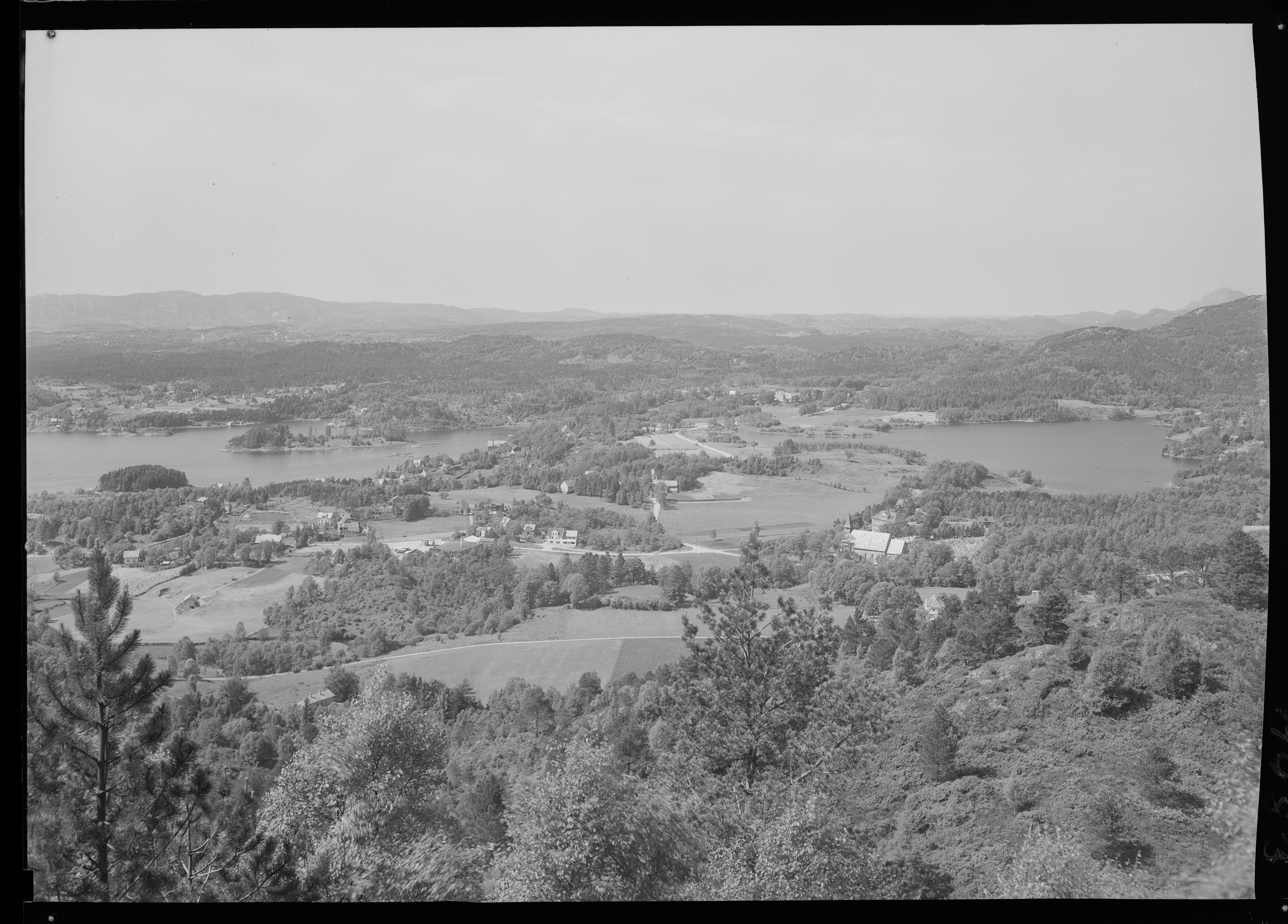
View of the Fana area around 1950.

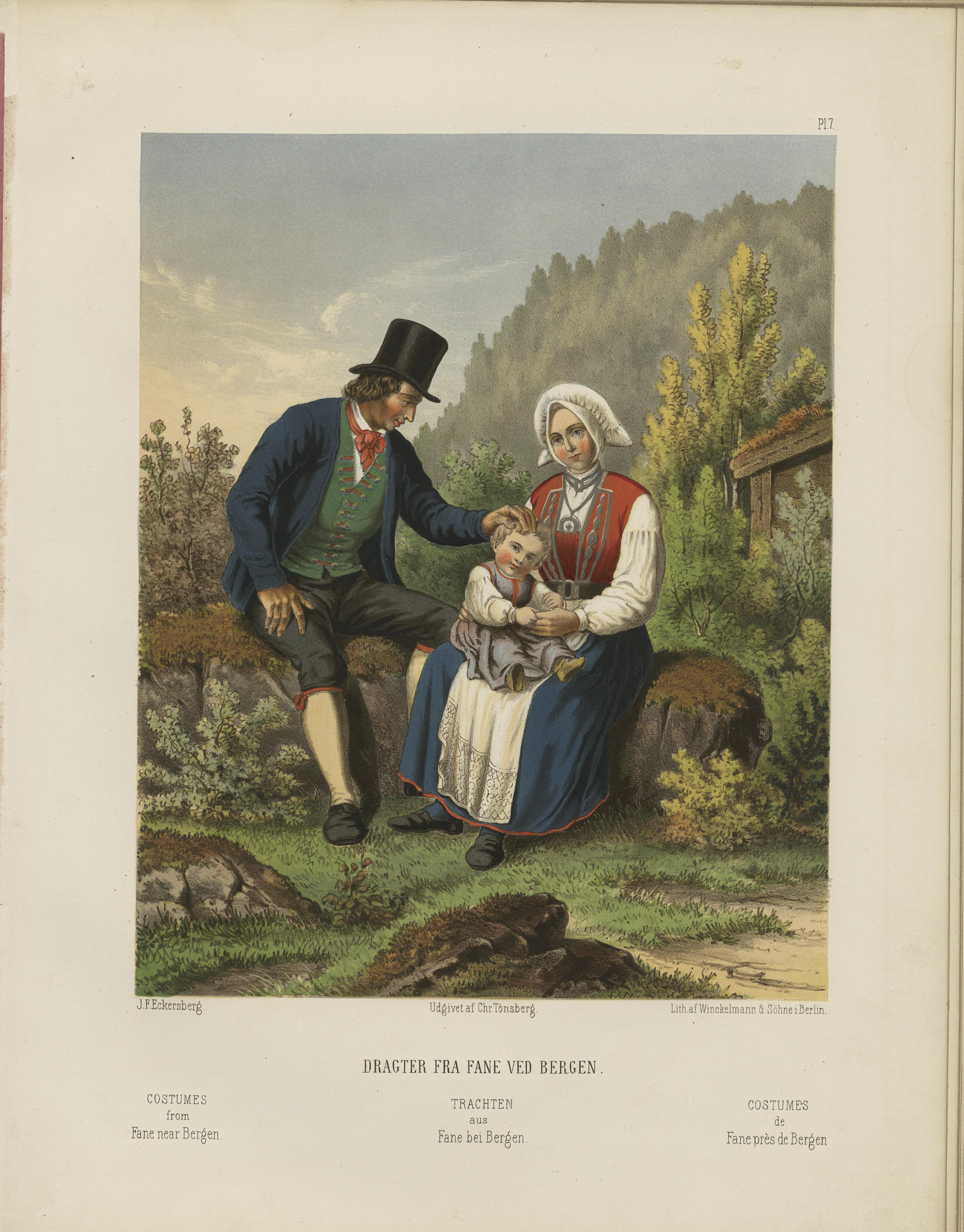
Painting of a family from Fana (c. 1861)

On 1 January 1838, the parish of "Fane" was established as a formannskapsdistrikt, the predecessor of today's municipalities ("kommune"). The spelling was later changed to "Fana". In 1879, a small area of Fana (population: 18) was transferred to the Laksevåg parish in the neighboring Askøy Municipality.

On 12 August 1955, the northern part of the Fyllingsdalen valley in Fana Municipality (population: 1,590) was sold to the city of Bergen for 1.5 million kr. This gave the city a lot of room to grow. On 1 January 1966, another small border adjustment took place: a small part of Fana Municipality located along the lake Ortuvatnet in the Fyllingsdalen valley (population: 4) was transferred to the city of Bergen.

On 1 January 1972, the city of Bergen was greatly expanded and the following areas were merged to for a new, much larger Bergen Municipality with over 200,000 residents:

- the city of Bergen (population: 111,925)
- all of Fana Municipality (population: 44,402)
- all of Laksevåg Municipality (population: 24,672)
- all of Åsane Municipality (population: 19,205)
- all of Arna Municipality (population: 11,766)

=== Name ===
The municipality (originally the parish) is named after the old Fana farm (Old Norse: Fani) since the first Fana Church was built there. The meaning of the name is uncertain and there are several possibilities for its meaning. One option is that it is the dative case of fana which means "swamp" or "marshland". Another possibility is that it comes from a local dialect word faan which means "dust" or "ash". A third possibility is that it comes from a Gothic language word fana which means "piece of cloth". Regardless of its meaning, it is thought that the farm was named after the local Fanafjorden or a local mountain.

Historically, the name of the municipality was spelled Fane. On 3 November 1917, a royal resolution changed the spelling of the name of the municipality to Fana.

=== Coat of arms ===
The coat of arms was for Fana had a blazon saying "Azure, a fleur-de-lis above three billets fesswise in base argent" (Norwegian: I blått, en sølv lilje over 3 sølv vannrette stokker, 2-1.). This means the arms have a blue field (background) and the charge is a fleur-de-lis above three rectangular bars (with 2 over 1). The charge has a tincture of argent which means it is commonly colored white, but if it is made out of metal, then silver is used.

=== Churches ===
The Church of Norway had three prestegjelds each with their own parish (sokn) within Fana Municipality. At the time of the municipal dissolution, it was part of the Bergen domprosti (arch-deanery) in the Diocese of Bjørgvin.

Churches in Fana Municipality
Prestegjeld	Parish (sokn)	Church name	Location of the church	Year built
Fana	Fana	Fana Church	Fanahammeren	1150
Birkeland	Birkeland	Birkeland Church	Nesttun	1878
Birkeland	Birkeland	Fantoft Chapel	Fantoft	1883
Storetveit	Storetveit	Storetveit Church	Fjøsanger	1930

== Geography ==
The municipality was located in the central part of the Bergen Peninsula, south of the city of Bergen. The area of the former municipality encompassed the southern half of the present-day Bergen Municipality, specifically the present-day boroughs of Fyllingsdalen, Ytrebygda, and Fana, as well as the southern part of the borough of Årstad. The highest point in the municipality was the 914-metre (2,999 ft) tall mountain Gullfjellet.

Bergen Municipality was located to the north, Arna Municipality was located to the northeast, Samnanger Municipality was located to the east, Os Municipality was located to the south, Austevoll Municipality was located to the southwest, Sund Municipality was located to the west, and Fjell Municipality was located to the northwest.

== Government ==
While it existed, Fana Municipality was responsible for primary education (through 10th grade), outpatient health services, senior citizen services, welfare and other social services, zoning, economic development, and municipal roads and utilities. The municipality was governed by a municipal council of directly elected representatives. The mayor was indirectly elected by a vote of the municipal council. The municipality was under the jurisdiction of the Gulating Court of Appeal.

=== Municipal council ===
The municipal council (Kommunestyre) of Laksevåg Municipality was made up of 53 representatives that were elected to four year terms. The tables below show the historical composition of the council by political party.

Fana kommunestyre 1967–1971
Party name (in Norwegian)	Number of representatives
Labour Party (Arbeiderpartiet)	17
Conservative Party (Høyre)	19
Christian Democratic Party (Kristelig Folkeparti)	4
Centre Party (Senterpartiet)	2
Socialist People's Party (Sosialistisk Folkeparti)	2
Liberal Party (Venstre)	9
Total number of members:	53
Note: On 1 January 1972, Fana Municipality became part of Bergen Municipality.

Fana kommunestyre 1963–1967
Party name (in Norwegian)	Number of representatives
Labour Party (Arbeiderpartiet)	19
Conservative Party (Høyre)	20
Christian Democratic Party (Kristelig Folkeparti)	4
Centre Party (Senterpartiet)	1
Socialist People's Party (Sosialistisk Folkeparti)	1
Liberal Party (Venstre)	8
Total number of members:	53

Fana herredsstyre 1959–1963
Party name (in Norwegian)	Number of representatives
Labour Party (Arbeiderpartiet)	14
Conservative Party (Høyre)	17
Christian Democratic Party (Kristelig Folkeparti)	4
Liberal Party (Venstre)	8
Total number of members:	41

Fana herredsstyre 1955–1959
Party name (in Norwegian)	Number of representatives
Labour Party (Arbeiderpartiet)	15
Conservative Party (Høyre)	15
Communist Party (Kommunistiske Parti)	1
Christian Democratic Party (Kristelig Folkeparti)	4
Farmers' Party (Bondepartiet)	1
Liberal Party (Venstre)	7
Total number of members:	43

Fana herredsstyre 1951–1955
Party name (in Norwegian)	Number of representatives
Labour Party (Arbeiderpartiet)	13
Conservative Party (Høyre)	12
Christian Democratic Party (Kristelig Folkeparti)	4
Farmers' Party (Bondepartiet)	1
Liberal Party (Venstre)	6
Total number of members:	36

Fana herredsstyre 1947–1951
Party name (in Norwegian)	Number of representatives
Labour Party (Arbeiderpartiet)	12
Conservative Party (Høyre)	10
Communist Party (Kommunistiske Parti)	1
Christian Democratic Party (Kristelig Folkeparti)	4
Farmers' Party (Bondepartiet)	1
Liberal Party (Venstre)	7
Local List(s) (Lokale lister)	1
Total number of members:	36

Fana herredsstyre 1945–1947
Party name (in Norwegian)	Number of representatives
Labour Party (Arbeiderpartiet)	11
Conservative Party (Høyre)	9
Communist Party (Kommunistiske Parti)	2
Christian Democratic Party (Kristelig Folkeparti)	4
Liberal Party (Venstre)	7
Local List(s) (Lokale lister)	3
Total number of members:	36

Fana herredsstyre 1937–1941*
Party name (in Norwegian)	Number of representatives
Labour Party (Arbeiderpartiet)	9
Conservative Party (Høyre)	8
Farmers' Party (Bondepartiet)	2
Liberal Party (Venstre)	6
Local List(s) (Lokale lister)	3
Total number of members:	28
Note: Due to the German occupation of Norway during World War II, no elections were held for new municipal councils until after the war ended in 1945.

=== Mayors ===
The mayor (Norwegian: ordfører) of Fana Municipality was the political leader of the municipality and the chairperson of the municipal council. The following people have held this position:

- 1838–1839: Ivar Munthe Daae
- 1840–1843: Jens Kobro Daae
- 1844–1855: Wollert Konow Sr.
- 1856–1865: Hans Jensen Krog
- 1866–1867: Nils Nilsson Nøttveit
- 1868–1869: Rasmus Larsen Bøgenes
- 1870–1873: Kolbein Karlsen Fantoft
- 1874–1879: Nils Nilsen Nøttveit
- 1880–1883: Wollert Konow Jr.
- 1884–1885: Ole Torbjørnsen Myklestad
- 1886–1891: Wollert Konow Jr.
- 1892–1893: Steffen Sælen
- 1894–1901: Wollert Konow Jr.
- 1902–1907: Steffen Sælen
- 1908–1910: Ivar Bergersen Sælen
- 1911–1913: Steffen Sælen
- 1914–1916: Ivar Bergersen Sælen
- 1917–1918: Georg Sivert
- 1920–1925: Fredrik Odfjell
- 1926–1931: Wilhelm Mohr
- 1932–1940: Hjalmar Negaard
- 1945–1956: Jacob Meland
- 1956–1959: Kaare Meland
- 1959–1971: Jacob L. Berstad

== See also ==
- List of former municipalities of Norway
