= Arne Lofthus =

Norwegian painter (1881–1962)

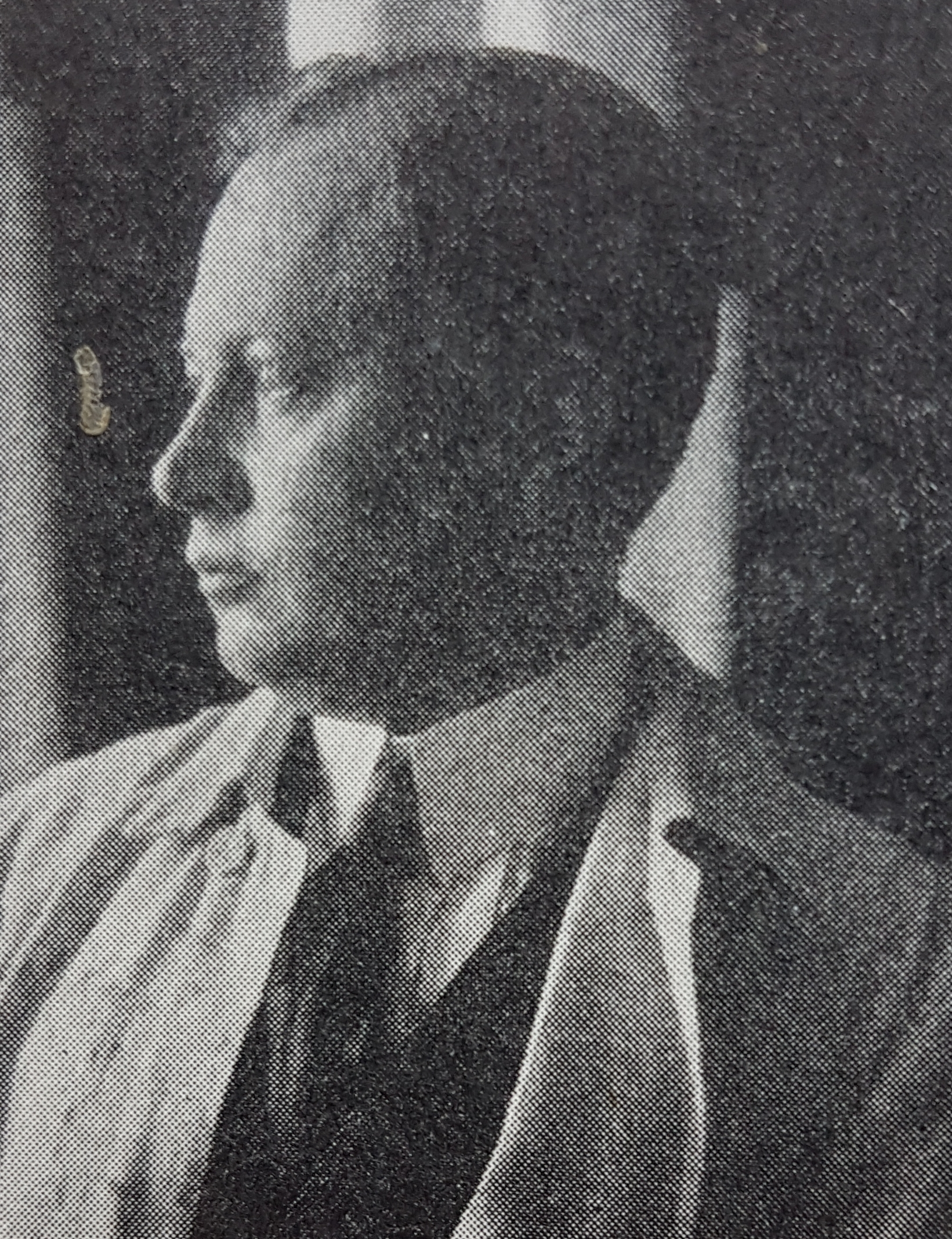
- Born: 23 September 1881; Bergen, Norway
- Died: 16 May 1962 (aged 80); Copenhagen, Denmark
- Education: Copenhagen Technical College
- Occupation: Painter

Arne Lofthus (23 September 1881 – 16 May 1962) was a Norwegian painter who settled in Denmark.

== Background ==
Arne Wallem Lofthus was born in Bergen, Norway to newspaper editor Olav Lofthus (1847–94) and Valborg Henriette Wallem (1851–1929). He attended Bergen Cathedral School. He studied at the Copenhagen Technical College 1899–1901. From 1902 to 1903 he studied with Kristian Zahrtmann. In 1901 Arne Lofthus joined Joakim Skovgaard and became one of his co-workers at the fresco decoration of Viborg Cathedral. This collaboration lasted until 1906. In 1907–08, Lofthus studied in Paris.

In 1907 he made his debut at Den frie Udstilling in Copenhagen. From 1915, he was a permanent resident of Copenhagen. He received the A. C. Houen Grant (A. C. Houens legat) in 1907, 1912 and the Conrad Mohr Grant (Conrad Mohrs legat) in 1923.

== Career ==
Lofthus painted landscapes, still lifes, floral motifs and portraits, often in subdued colors. He has become known for his use of the fresco technique, but he also painted in oil and watercolor and drew with coal. His images are usually attributed to the extension of Impressionism.

Among his paintings are the frescos Pike som grer håret (1915), Else blåser såpebobler (1916), Oksestek (1924) and Blomkål og epler, all in the National Gallery of Norway. His portraits include oceanographer Bjørn Helland-Hansen, poet Nordahl Grieg as well as painters Karl Madsen and Joakim Skovgaard.

== Personal life ==
In 1909, Lofthus was married to Sofie Vilhelmine Madsen (1887-1965), daughter of the painter and art historian Karl Madsen.

== Other sources ==
- Marianne Barbusse Mariager Arne Lofthus (Kunstindeks Danmark/Weilbachs Kunstnerleksikon)
