= Anton Mohr =

Norwegian geographer and historian (1890–1968)

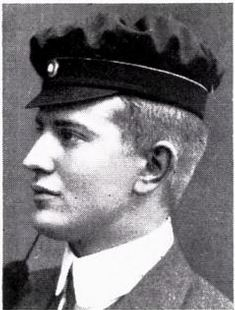
- Mohr as student
- Born: 8 February 1890; Fana Municipality, Norway
- Died: 14 September 1968 (aged 78)
- Parent: Conrad Mohr
- Relatives: Wilhelm Mohr (brother); Wilhelm Mohr (nephew)
- Awards: Order of St Olav

Anton Mohr (8 February 1890 – 14 September 1968) was a Norwegian geographer and historian.

He was born in Fana Municipality to merchant and consul Conrad Mohr and Agnete Kroepelien, and was a brother of Wilhelm Mohr. He was a central person in the establishment of the Norwegian School of Economics, and was appointed professor of political history at the institution from 1946 to 60. His works include his thesis Kampen om Nilen from 1923, Kampen om oljen from 1925, Norges Kornforsyning inntil 1914 from 1954, and De 50 statene (1959). He wrote three books on the Napoleonic era, Keiseren av Elba, De hundrede dager and Mot Sankt Helena. He was decorated Knight, First Class of the Order of St. Olav in 1960, and was a Commander of the Order of the Crown of Italy and Knight of the French Legion of Honour.
