= A. C. Houen Grant =

The A. C. Houen Grant (Norwegian: A. C. Houens legat) was a grant that awarded funds to Norwegian artists. The grant was established by the Norwegian businessman and philanthropist Anton Christian Houen (1823–1894). There is some uncertainty about some of the awards that were associated with this fund, including whether the painter Astri Welhaven Heiberg received the grant in the 1920s.

The grant was created in 1885 under the name A. C. Houen Grant for Norwegian Artists and Scientists (Norwegian: A.C. Houens Legat for norske Kunstnere og Videnskabsmænd). It was an extension of the Norwegian Artists' Travel and Education Fund (Norwegian: De norske Kunstneres Reise- og Uddannelses-Fond), which was created by Houen in 1878.

The grant's rules did not exclude repeated awards to the same artist; Ragnvald Hjerlow, Harald Dal, and Arne Lofthus are among the artists that received the grant several times. The grant awarded scholarships by application, which could be enclosed with recommendations from other artists. When the musician and composer Eyvind Alnæs applied for a grant in 1892, his application included a recommendation from Edvard Grieg. Alnæs received the grant, and he used the funds to travel to Leipzig for further study.

The grant was merged with the Conrad Mohr Grant toward the end of the 20th century, and it is now known as the Houen and Mohr Grant for Artists (Norwegian: Houens og Mohrs legat for kunstnere).

== Recipients (selected) ==
- 1890: Ragnvald Hjerlow, painter
- 1891: Ragnvald Hjerlow (second award)
- 1892: Eyvind Alnæs, composer, organist, and choir conductor
- 1892: Gabriel Finne, writer
- 1895: Harald Sohlberg
- 1896: Harald Sohlberg (second award)
- 1897: Halfdan Egedius
- 1899: Emanuel Vigeland, artist
- 1900: Hjalmar Borgstrøm, composer
- 1906: Ingebrigt Vik, sculptor
- 1907: Arne Lofthus, painter
- 1910: Per Reidarson, composer and violinist
- 1911: Nikolai Astrup, painter
- 1912: Arne Lofthus (second award)
- 1917: Kristofer Lange, architect
- 1934: Laila Aavatsmark, pianist
- 1934: Carl Gustav Sparre Olsen, violinist
- 1936(?): Finn Audun Oftedal, pianist and conductor
- 1945: Olaf Christiansen, painter
- 1947: Marit Isene, opera singer
- 1955: Ottar Helge Johannessen, graphic artist and painter
- 1960: Harald Peterssen, painter
- 1962: Trond Øyen, violinist
- 1964: Frank Frantzen, painter and graphic artist
- 1968: Jørleif Uthaug, sculptor and painter
- (unknown) Lasse Kolstad, actor
- 1983: Ingrid Austlid Rise, jeweler and designer

== See also ==
- Houen Foundation Award
