= Ragnvald Hjerlow =

Norwegian painter (1863–1947)

Ragnvald Amandus Pedersen Hjerlow
- Born: Ragnvald Amandus Pedersen Hjerlow; February 20, 1863
- Died: March 13, 1947 (aged 84)

Ragnvald Amandus Pedersen Hjerlow (surname also spelled Hjerløw; February 20, 1863 – March 13, 1947) was a Norwegian painter and a teacher at the Norwegian National Academy of Craft and Art Industry.

Hjerlow was born in Christiania (now Oslo). He received early training under Jacob Calmeyer, graduated from the National Academy of Craft and Art Industry in 1880, and then became a student of Knud Bergslien. He studied in Munich in 1882 and in Paris and Brittany from 1889 at 1891. He received the A. C. Houen Grant in 1890 and 1891. In 1883 he attended Frits Thaulow's "open-air academy" at Modum, and he debuted at the Autumn Exhibition in 1883. Hjerlow attended the 1889 World Exhibition in Paris, where he received honorable mention.

Hjerlow was a teacher at Christiania Burgher School from 1895 and a senior teacher at the National Academy of Craft and Art Industry from 1908 to 1933. He is represented in the National Gallery with his painting Fra mitt vindu (From My Window), painted in Paris in 1891. The painting is described as "a sunny and colorfully well-executed little picture."
