= Karl Madsen =

Danish painter and art historian

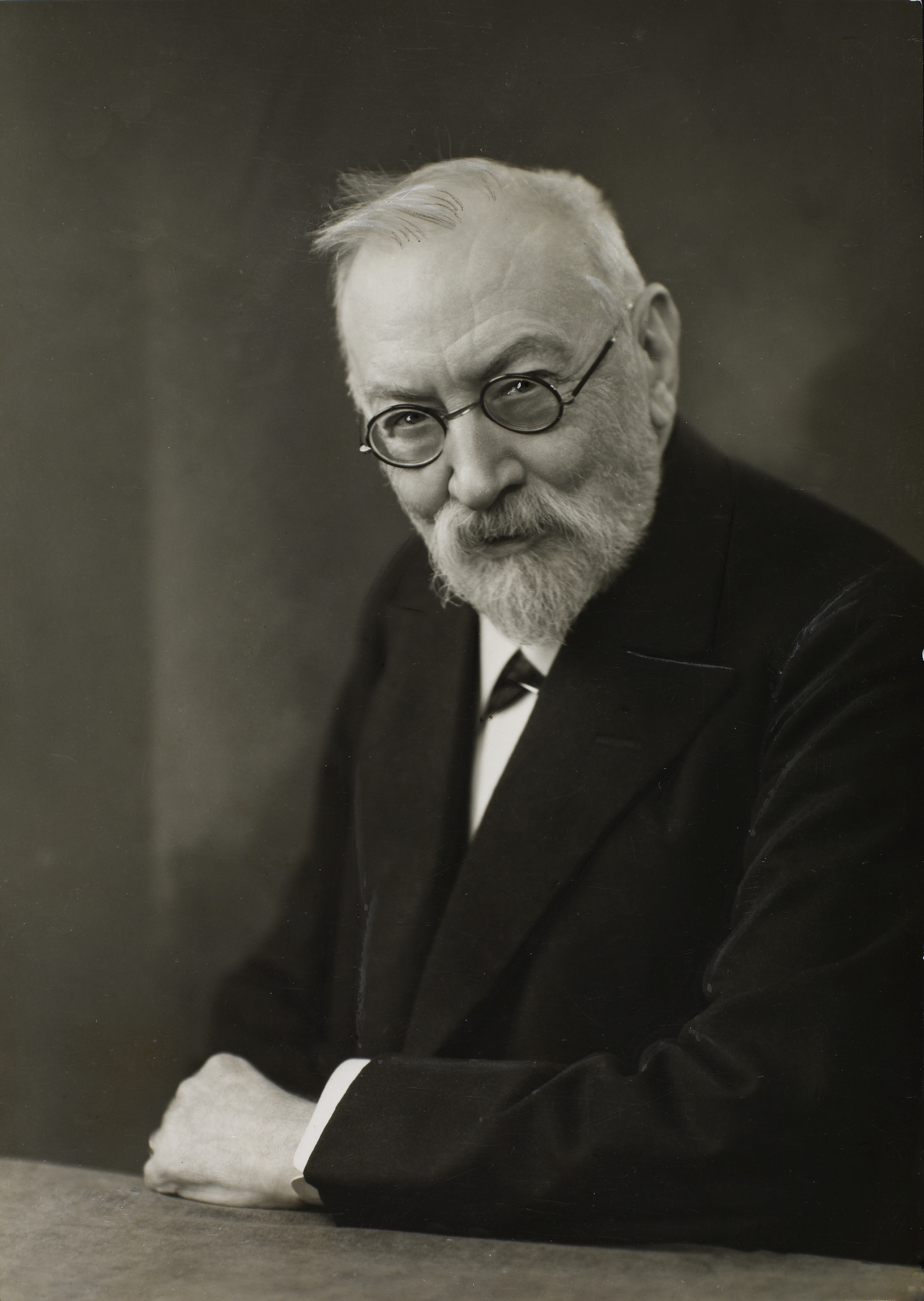
- Born: March 22, 1855; Copenhagen, Denmark
- Died: April 16, 1938 (aged 83)
- Education: Sorø Academy; Royal Danish Academy of Fine Arts; Académie des Beaux-Arts
- Known for: Painting; Art history
- Movement: Modern Breakthrough

Carl Johan Wilhelm Madsen, commonly known as Karl Madsen, (22 March 1855 – 16 April 1938) was a Danish painter and art historian with close connections to the Skagen Painters.

== Early life and education ==
Born in Copenhagen on 22 March 1855, Madsen was the son of painters Andreas Peter Madsen and Sophie Thorsøe Madsen. He completed his schooling at Sorø Academy before attending C.V. Nielsen's art school in 1871. From 1872 to 1876, he studied at the Royal Danish Academy of Fine Arts. He was a student of Vilhelm Kyhn and of Jean-Léon Gérôme at the Académie des Beaux-Arts in Paris (1876–1879).

== Career ==
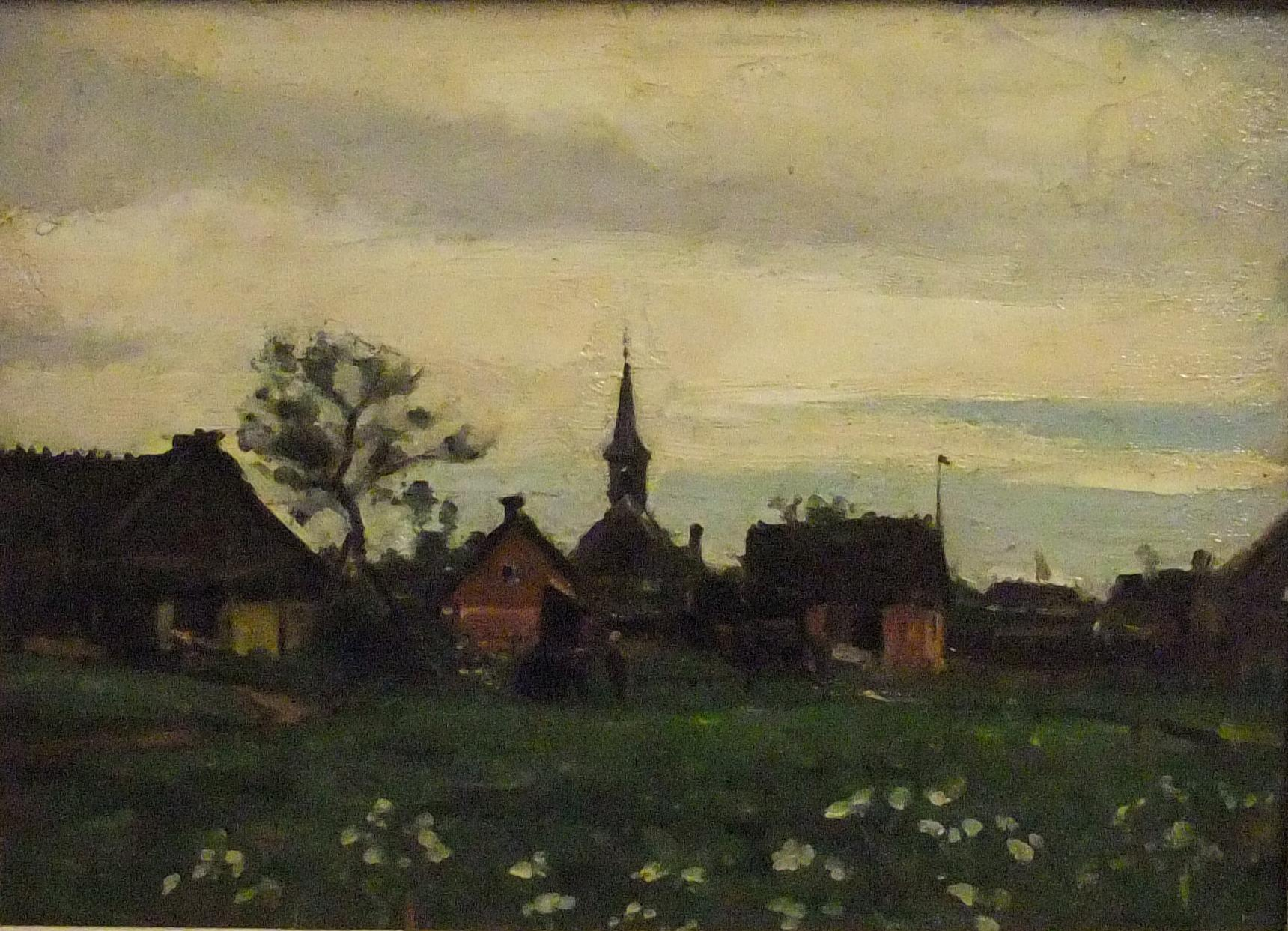
Sketch of Hornbæk with church (1885)

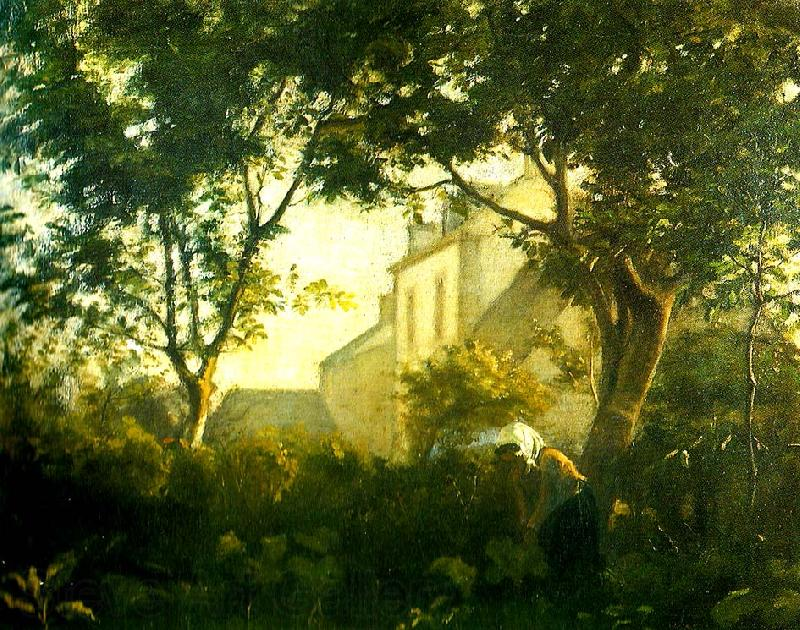
La ville hue ved Saint Briac i Bretagne (1878)

Madsen was greatly influenced in the early 1860s by the radical new departure in Danish culture, led by Georg Brandes, whose lectures at Copenhagen University he followed, and Holger Drachmann, who published his strong views on Danish art and on disappointing conditions at the Art Academy. In 1871, Drachmann went to Skagen, a fishing village at the northernmost tip of Jutland, to paint outdoor scenes and the local fishermen. Almost simultaneously, Madsen also arrived in Skagen.

During his first year at the Art Academy, he met Michael Ancher, whom he persuaded to join him in Skagen in July 1874. There he gave Anna Brøndum, later Anna Ancher, lessons in painting. His art work in 1873–1874 and from 1879 to 1880 shows that he was one of the key figures among the Skagen Painters. His portraits had a vitality comparable to those of Michael and Anna Ancher and Christian Krohg, but he lacked the virtuosity and sense of colour enjoyed by Peder Severin Krøyer, Viggo Johansen and the Swedish and Norwegian painters. His most interesting works are perhaps those from his last year in Paris where he came under the influence of the Barbizon school and possibly Édouard Manet, although they still tend to be rather dark and dull compared to the brighter works of the Impressionists who were influenced by the young Naturalists.

The gap between Madsen and the trends of the times as well as his own economic problems were probably behind his decision to become a professional writer. On Drachmann's recommendation, he became an art critic with Dagavisen in 1881. As a frequent contributor to Politiken and other periodicals, including Tilskueren, he became one of Denmark's most influential art commentators and critics. He was a champion of Dutch art and wrote Japansk Malerkunst (1885), a pioneering book on the art of Japan.

As a museum expert, Madsen became recognized as an authority on Dutch art and brought about a reassessment of Danish art in the first half of the 19th century, especially with his biography of Johan Lundbye in 1895. He was the director of Statens Museum for Kunst from 1911 to 1925, and director of Skagens Museum from 1928 to 1938.

Madsen received an honorary doctorate at Lund University and became a Knight in the Order of the Dannebrog in 1909 and Commander 2nd Class in 1925.

== Personal life ==
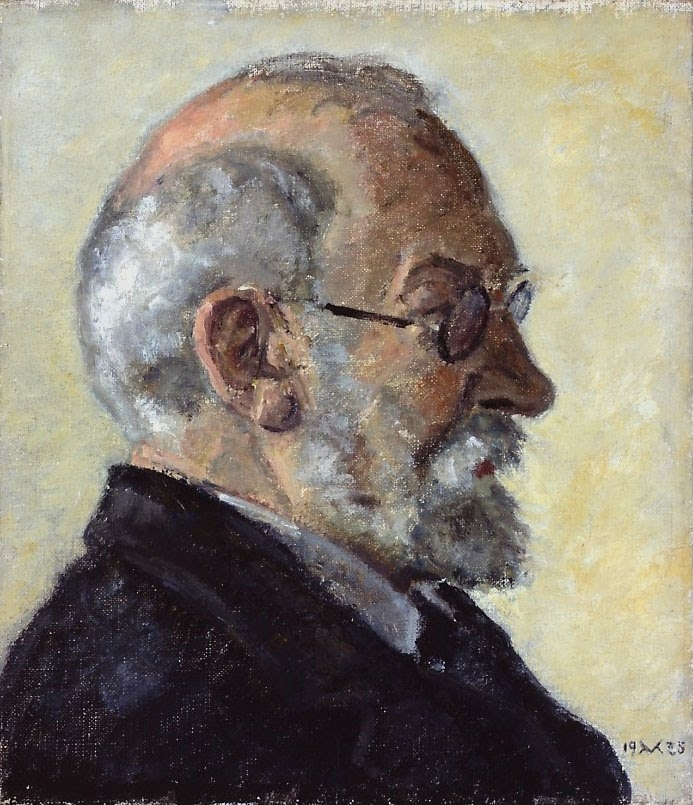
Karl Madsen by Viggo Madsen (1900)

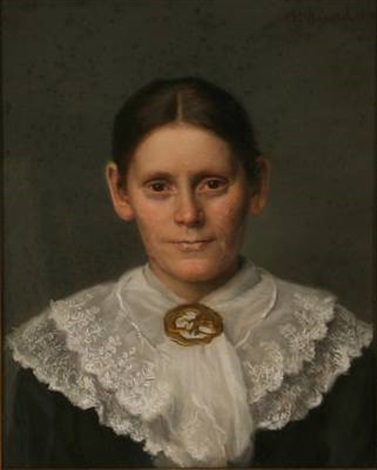
Madsen's second wife, Thora Juliane Madsen, painted by Elisabeth Wandel in 1890

Madsen married twice. He married his first wife Johanne Henriette Møller on 3 June 1880 but she died on 9 March the following year during the birth of their first child. He then married Thora Juliane Nielsen (5 August 1858 – 9 December 1929) on 4 July 1883. They had four children, two sons and two daughters.

Madsen's son by his first wife, Henry Sofus Madsen (1881–1921) was an egyptologist, journalist and editor. Another son, Svend Viggo Madsen (1885–1954) was also a painter. His elder daughter, Sofie Madsen (1887–1965) married the painter Arne Lofthus Madsen died on 16 April 1938 and was buried in Assistens Cemetery.
