= Krossfjorden (Vestland) =

Fjord in Vestland, Norway

- Korsfjorden (unofficial)
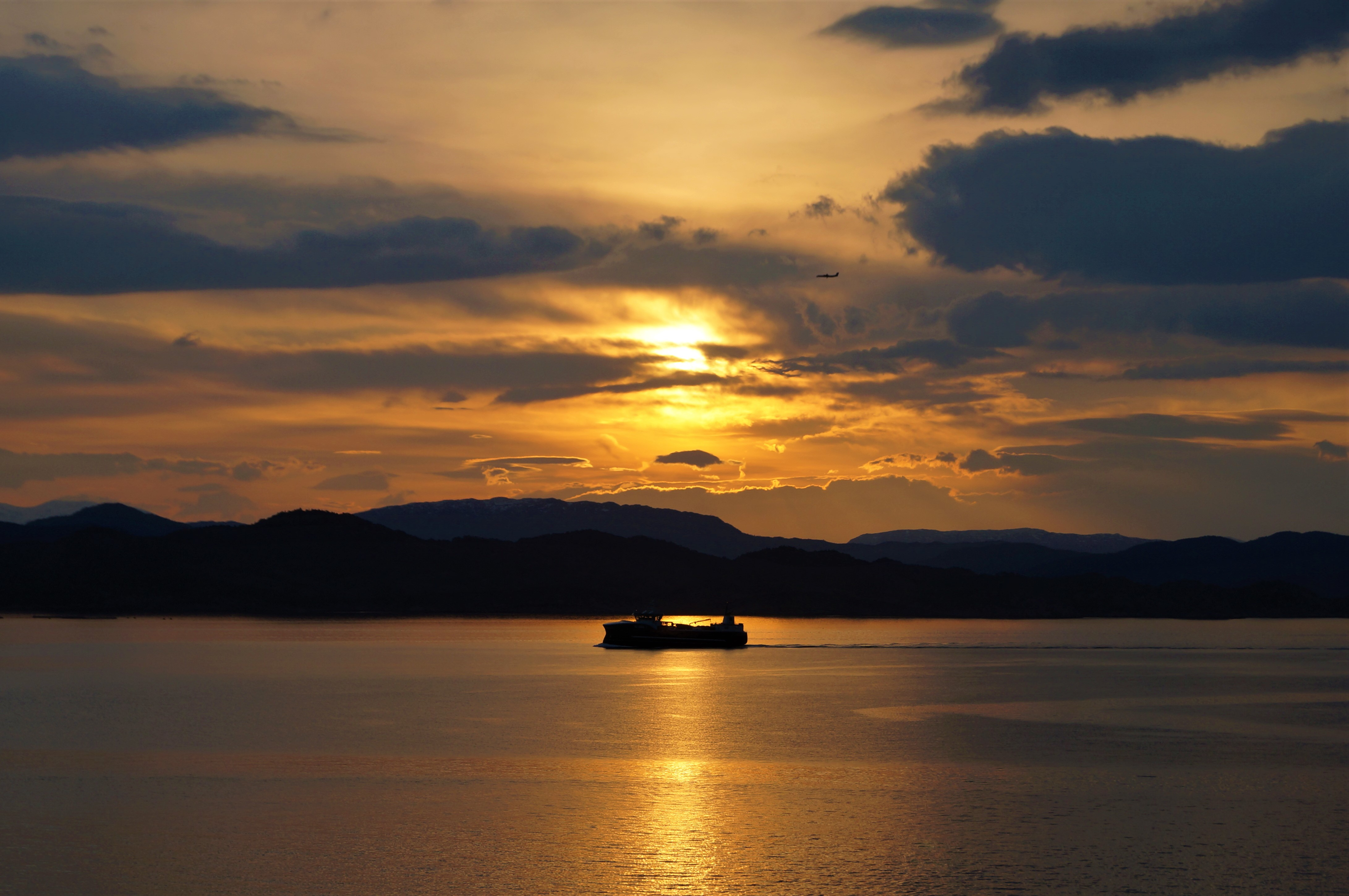
- View of the fjord
- Interactive map of Krossfjorden
- Location: Vestland county, Norway
- Coordinates: 60.15741°N 5.11691°E
- Type: Fjord
- Primary inflows: Bjørnafjorden, Raunefjorden, Fanafjorden, and Lysefjorden
- Primary outflows: North Sea
- Basin countries: Norway
- Max. length: 14 kilometres (8.7 mi)
- Max. width: 2–3 kilometres (1.2–1.9 mi)
- Max. depth: 640 metres (2,100 ft)

Krossfjorden (or unofficially Korsfjorden) is a fjord in Vestland county, Norway. The 14-kilometre (8.7 mi) long fjord lies along the border of Austevoll Municipality (to the south), Øygarden Municipality (to the north), and Bergen Municipality (to the east). The Krossfjorden is one of the main passages from the North Sea to the port of the city of Bergen.

Krossfjorden is 14 kilometres (8.7 mi) long, 2–3 kilometres (1.2–1.9 mi) wide and up to 640 metres (2,100 ft) deep. The island of Sotra is located to the north of the fjord and the islands of Storakalsøy and Hundvåko are to the south. The Marstein Lighthouse is located on the south side of the mouth of Krossfjorden. The Lysefjorden cuts east and northeast into the Bergen Peninsula as a continuation of Krossfjorden. The Bjørnafjorden continues southwards from the Krossfjorden and the Raunefjorden and Fanafjorden head to the north and northeast from the Krossfjorden.

== See also ==
- List of Norwegian fjords
