= Krokeide =

- Neighborhood in Bergen
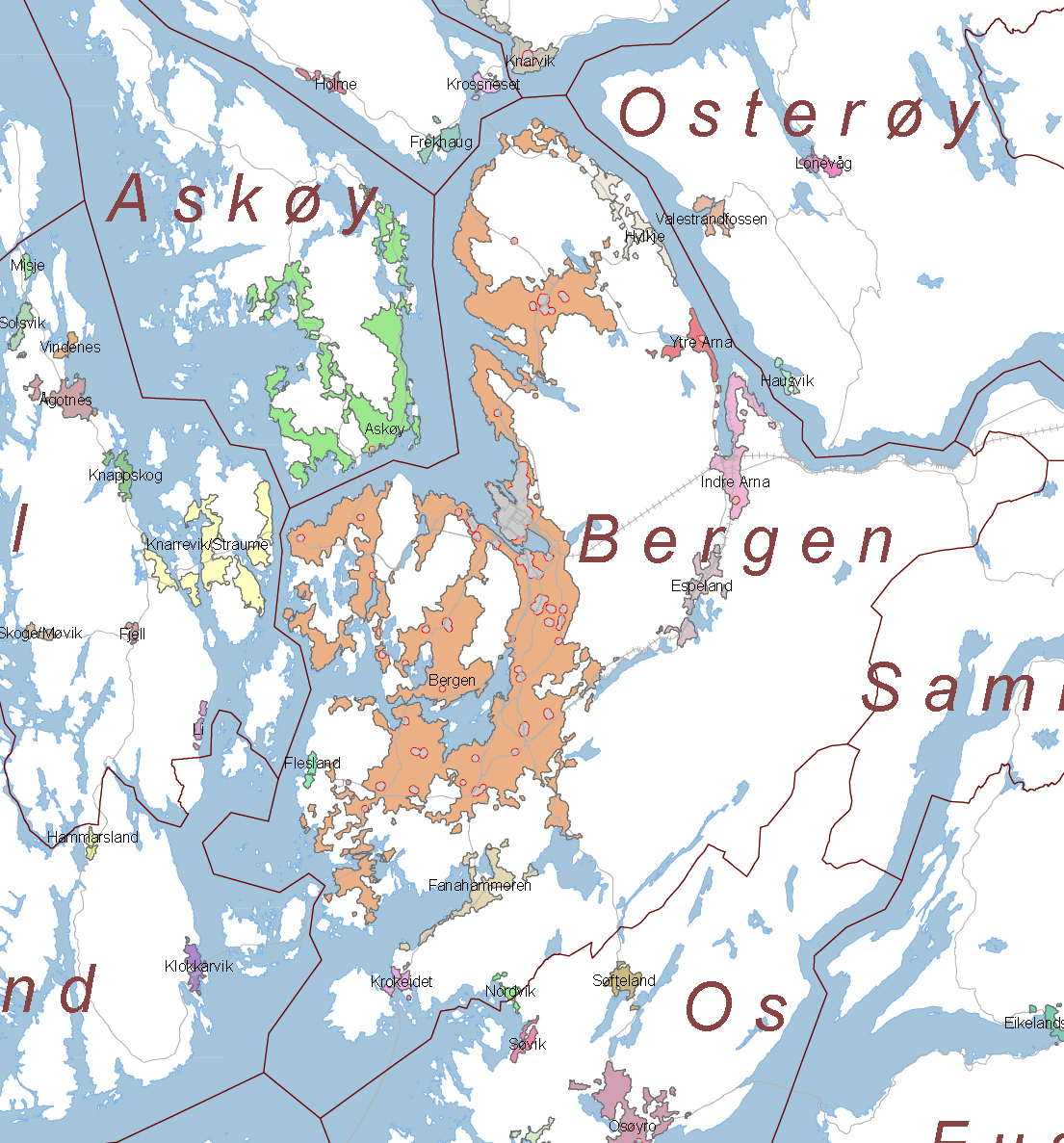
- Location of Krokeidet in Bergen
- Interactive map of Krokeide
- Coordinates: 60.2274°N 5.2945°E
- Country: Norway
- Region: Western Norway
- County: Vestland
- Municipality: Bergen Municipality
- Borough: Fana

Area
  - Total: 0.54 km^{2} (0.21 sq mi)
- Elevation: 47 m (154 ft)

Population (2025)
  - Total: 364
  - Density: 674/km^{2} (1,750/sq mi)
- Time zone: UTC+01:00 (CET)
  - Summer (DST): UTC+02:00 (CEST)

Krokeide is a suburban village in the borough of Fana in Bergen Municipality in Vestland county, Norway. It is located near the end of a small peninsula between the Lysefjorden and Fanafjorden, about 20 kilometres (12 mi) south of the city centre of Bergen.

The 0.54-square-kilometre (130-acre) village has a population (2025) of 364 and a population density of 674 inhabitants per square kilometre (1,750/sq mi).

== Transport ==
The bus line 61 goes from the Nesttun terminal to Krokeide. Before the Bergen Light Rail between Byparken and Nesttun was opened in June 2011, the earlier line 560 buses drove between Krokeide and Bergen city centre. From Krokeide, there is a ferry route to Hufthamar in Austevoll Municipality.
