= Conrad Mohr =

Norwegian businessman

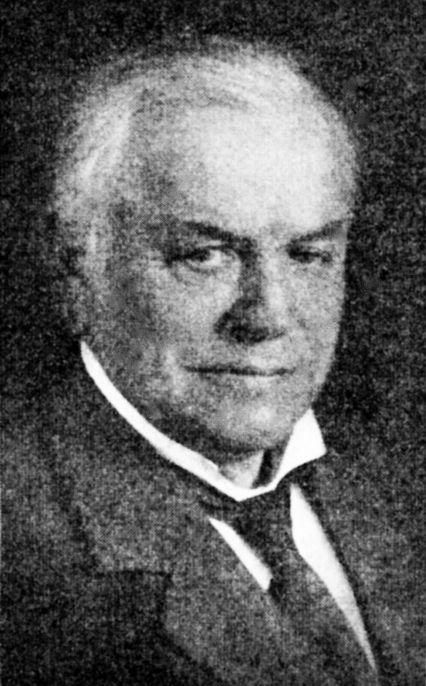
- Born: 5 January 1849; Bergen, Norway
- Died: 3 October 1926 (aged 77)
- Occupation: Grain merchant
- Children: Wilhelm Mohr; Anton Mohr
- Relatives: Wilhelm Mohr (grandson)

Conrad Mohr (5 January 1849 – 3 October 1926) was a Norwegian businessman and philanthropist.

== Biography ==
He was born in Bergen, Norway. He was the son of the merchant Wilhelm Mohr (1820–1880) and Antoinette Ulrikke Mowinckel (1823–1894). He was the brother of the jurist August Christian Mohr (1847–1918). He was the father of Wilhelm Mohr (1886–1978) and Anton Mohr (1890–1968), and the grandfather of Wilhelm Mohr (1917–2016).

After schooling in Bergen, Mohr went to a trading institute in Lausanne for two years followed by commercial training in Bremen and London for four years. In 1877, he entered the family firm Aug. C. Mohr & Søn, which had first been founded by his grandfather, August Christian Mohr (1775–1845). After his father's death in 1880, he became the head of the company together with his uncle Anton P. Mohr. After his uncle's death in 1890, he became a sole proprietor, but took Christian Magnus Kjær (1865–1935) as a partner in 1897. He turned his interest away from the traditional grain trade in the Baltic Sea to grain imports from southern Russia. He developed his company to become the largest grain importer in Norway in the late 19th century. In 1902 he retired from the firm.

In 1887, he was appointed German consul. In 1918, he became the German consulate general for Norway. He was decorated Knight, First Class of the Order of St. Olav in 1895, Commander, First Class in 1907, and received the Grand Cross in 1917.

In 1918, Mohr created the Conrad Mohr Grant (Conrad Mohrs legat), which provided scholarship and travel grants for Norwegian artists and journalists. At the end of the 20th century, the foundation was merged with the A. C. Houen Grant, which had been established in 1885 by the businessman Anton Christian Houen (1823–1894). The combined foundation now operates under the name Houens og Mohrs legat.
