= Houen Margarete Foundation =

Norwegian foundation

Coordinates: 58°27′50″N 08°46′41″E

The Houen Margarete Foundation (Norwegian: Den Houenske Margarete stiftelse), often simply referred to as the Margarete Foundation (Norwegian: Margarethestiftelsen), is a Norwegian foundation. It was created by a gift of money from Anton Christian Houen to Arendal Municipality in 1891. The foundation was named after Houen's mother and its purpose was to build an old-age home and a park facility. The monetary gift was NOK 200,000. Houen gave detailed instructions for the house and park design, house rules, and statutes. The statutes were approved by the Arendal executive council in September 1891.

The home was intended for honorable old men and women (hæderlige gamle Mænd og Kvinder) at least sixty years old who could no longer earn a sufficient livelihood and who had no close relatives to take care of them. It was to be built in beautifully rural setting that was completely healthy and openly situated. The institution was to be a source of pride for Arendal.

The foundation looked for a suitable place in the Arendal area and chose the property of Åsen in Barbu Municipality (now part of Arendal Municipality), a location with attractive views toward Galte Sound (Galtesund), Arendal's shipping lane. The area was expanded with several purchased parcels, and the result was a park between the streets Gamle Songevei and Kystveien. An attractive park was created there in the early 1900s, with ponds, sculptures, lawns, flowerbeds, and a playground. The park became an attraction for the city's inhabitants. Concerts and other events were held, and the park was widely visited.

However, the foundation's capital was not sufficient to build the Margarete Foundation's residence, which was not realized until 1955 with municipal grants. The original park is much smaller today. Some of it disappeared due to building and expanding the old age home, and some of it has become parking space, and a private outdoor area and building site for the ABBL/Kuviga Housing Cooperative.

The foundation's statutes state that the property must be protected against future buildings disturbing its rural character. The foundation's archive is located at the Aust-Agder cultural-historical center.
