= Fana Church =

Church in Vestland, Norway

- Fana kirke
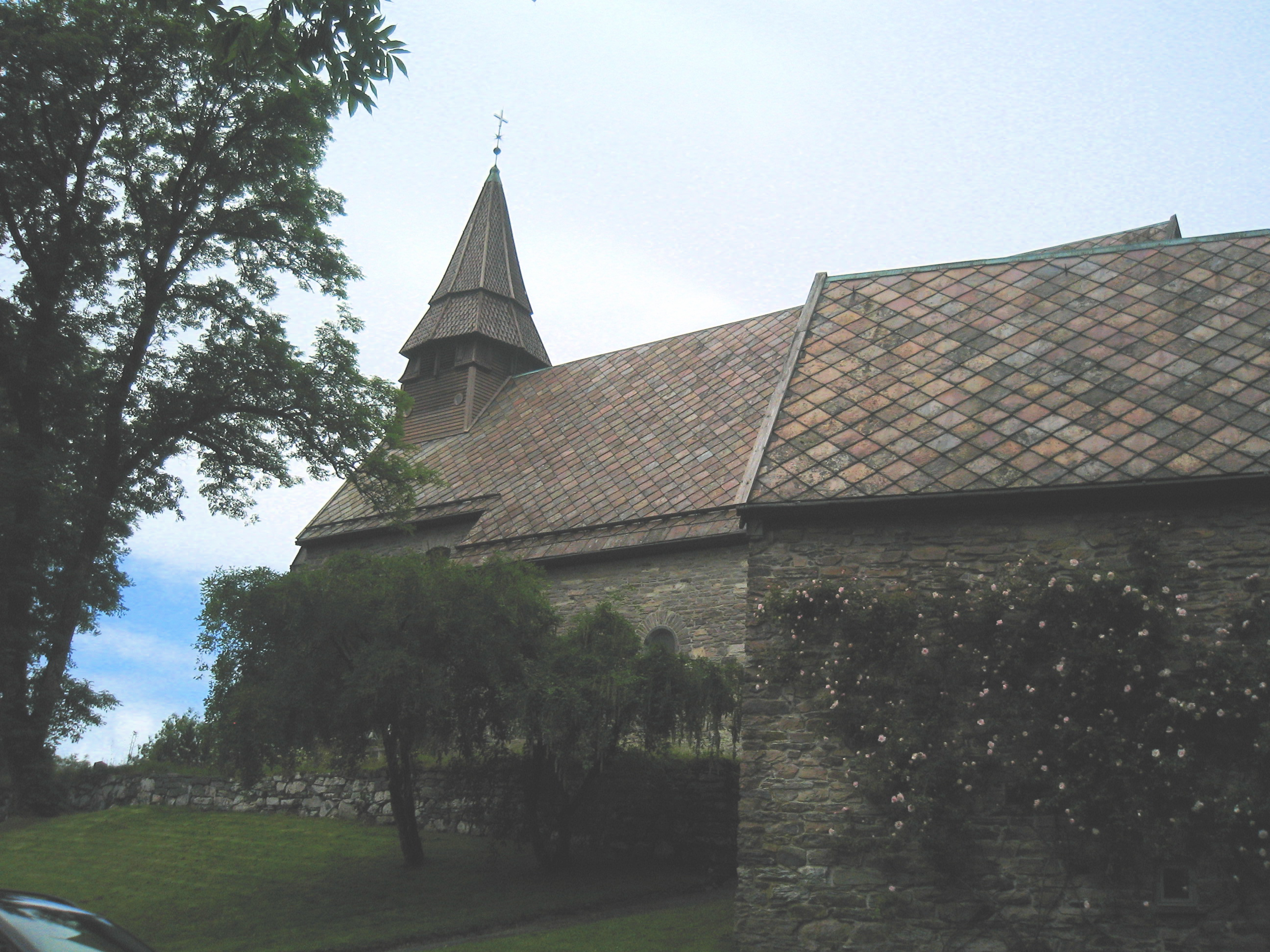
- View of the church
- Fana Church
- 60°15′48″N 5°20′54″E
- Location: Bergen Municipality, Vestland
- Country: Norway
- Denomination: Church of Norway
- Previous denomination: Catholic Church
- Churchmanship: Evangelical Lutheran

History
- Status: Parish church
- Founded: c. 1153
- Consecrated: c. 1153

Architecture
- Functional status: Active
- Architectural type: Long church
- Completed: c. 1153 (873 years ago)

Specifications
- Capacity: 450
- Materials: Stone

Administration
- Diocese: Bjørgvin bispedømme
- Deanery: Fana prosti
- Parish: Fana
- Norwegian Cultural Heritage Site
- Type: Church
- Status: Automatically protected
- ID: 84114

Fana Church (Norwegian: Fana Kirke) is a parish church of the Church of Norway in Bergen Municipality in Vestland county, Norway. It is located in Fanahammeren, a village in the borough of Fana in the city of Bergen. It is one of the two churches for the Fana parish which is part of the Fana prosti (deanery) in the Diocese of Bjørgvin. The gray, stone church was built in a long church design in the year 1153 using plans drawn up by an unknown architect. The church seats about 450 people. The existing stone building celebrated its 850-year anniversary in 2003, but the church building history is long and complicated. Historians assert that the church has been rebuilt and enlarged several times.

== History ==
Fana Church was mentioned in writings for the first time in 1228, when Pope Gregory IX released a conscription to the vicar and brothers at "the holy cross church and hospital in Fana". In the letter, it is mentioned that the bishops in Bergen had let the church be founded again: "de novo fundari". The stone church was likely originally built during the first half of the 12th century. The oldest parts of the existing church building are Romanesque architecture and the walls have been dated to the 12th century. Also, a letter from 1228 referred to the church as already having had several priests since it was founded. During the Middle Ages, the church had a hospital attached to it (probably dating back to the 1200s). This is said to have been located on a mound outside the cemetery, just west of the church (remains of the hospital foundation were recorded as still being visible in 1779). The stone church originally had a rectangular nave and a narrower, rectangular chancel. In 1644, the church tower was struck by lightning and burned. It was rebuilt afterwards.

In 1814, this church served as an election church (Norwegian: valgkirke). Together with more than 300 other parish churches across Norway, it was a polling station for elections to the 1814 Norwegian Constituent Assembly which wrote the Constitution of Norway. This was Norway's first national elections. Each church parish was a constituency that elected people called "electors" who later met together in each county to elect the representatives for the assembly that was to meet at Eidsvoll Manor later that year.

In 1870, the church was remodeled under the direction of Askild Aase. Before the rebuilding, the church had a wooden church porch with a tower on the roof over the western part of the nave. The renovation including tearing down this church porch and extending the nave to the west by 3.5 metres (11 ft) and building a new church porch. After the rebuilding, the church had a stone church porch that had a narrower wooden tower above it. Also during this renovation, the choir was made smaller in order to add two sacristies in the back. In 1926–1927, another renovation was carried out by the architect Frederik Konow Lund. The old church porch was removed and a new tower and base was built. Also, some of the old windows that had been removed in a previous renovation were added back. The roof was rebuilt and replaced.

=== Windows ===
The church has several stained glass windows by Bernhard Greve (1886-1962). The windows were designed to tell the history of the church. The artwork in the windows shows the following events:

- 1228: Fana Church is built after the christening of Norway by Saint Olaf.
- 1228: Conscription from Pope Gregory IX referenced The Holy Cross Church
- 1537: The silver cross, other treasures and lead row are removed.
- 1644: The church burns after having been struck by lightning.
- 1928: The church is re-consecrated after having been rebuilt.

=== Legend of the holy silver cross ===
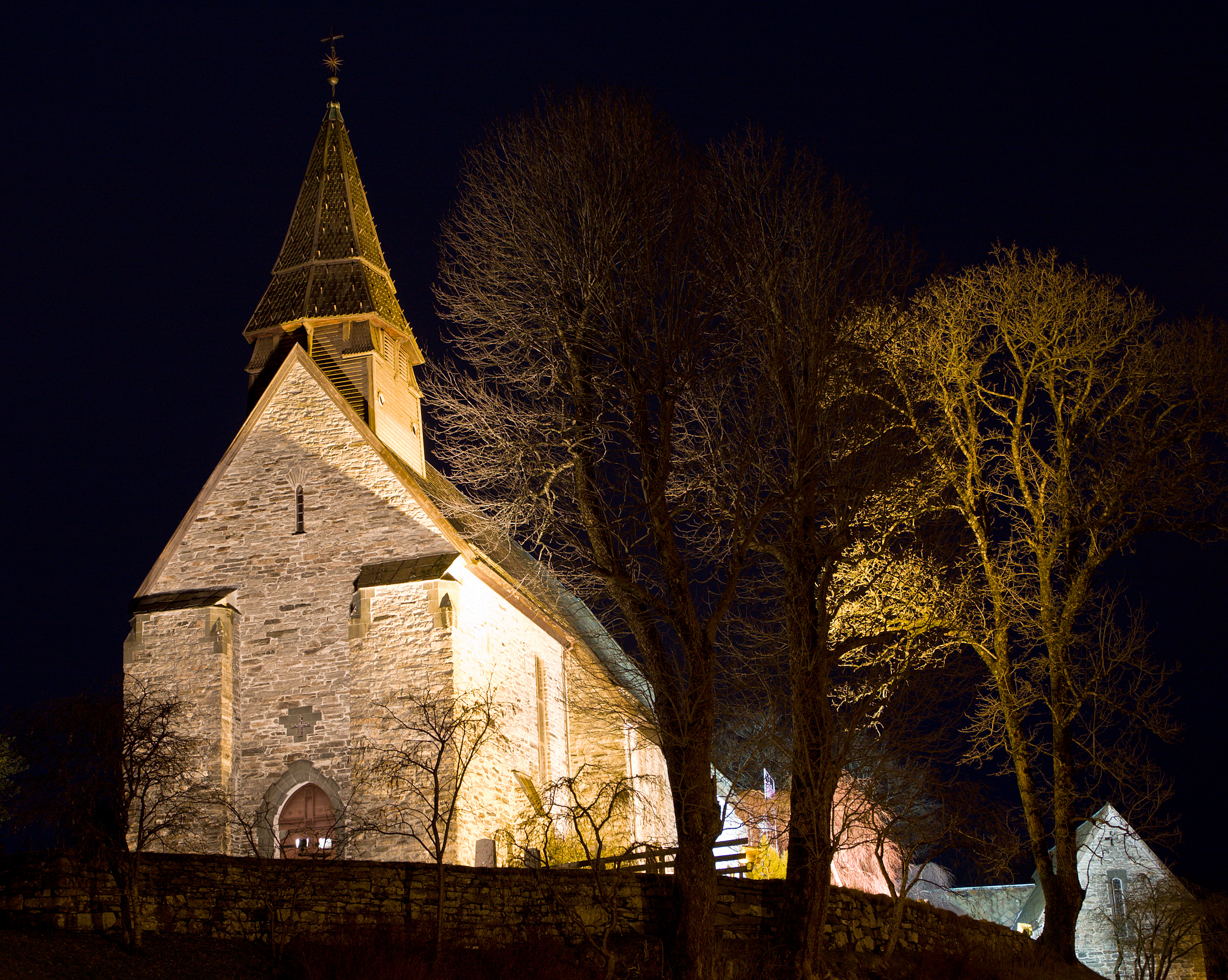
Fana church at night.

The legend "The Holy Silver Cross" is connected to Fana church. In 1626, King Christian IV of Denmark commissioned the University of Copenhagen to register all historical objects and occurrences in the Diocese of Bjørgvin. Skonvig, the son of a priest, sent a letter about the legend.

Two fishermen found a silver cross outside Korsneset along Korsfjorden. They tried to get the cross on land near Milde. However, the cross was too heavy to carry, so they knew the cross was meant for Fana. When they arrived at Fanahammeren, the cross was easy to carry. They brought it to the church where it was settled at the altar. One of the fishermen was blind, but when he touched the cross and scratched his eyes he gained sight again. The story about the healing cross reached many, and pilgrims visited the church hoping to be healed. It is said that at Krykkjehaugen, a small knoll close to the church, there were crutches and canes that pilgrims had left behind after having been healed at the cross. According to the legend, the priest in Fana burned six horse-loads of crutches in 1546.

=== Ownership ===
Since Fana Church was rather big compared to other rural churches, some believe that the church was a county church in its early years. It is believed that the hospital next to the church was shut down around 1300.

In 1303, Fana Church was one of 14 royal chapels after having been transferred from the Bishop in Bergen to the Apostle Church in Bergen. Fana Church is one of only 3 remaining royal chapels. In 1723, the royal deed was sold to two men from the parish, Nils Olson Austevoll and Vinsens Nilsson Nedre Titlestad. The church was privately held until 1862, when the parish bought it. The parish decided to rebuild the church in 1870–71. Major changes were done, but after some years it became apparent that rebuilding had been a mistake. In 1920, the architect Frederik Konow Lund (1889–1970) was hired, who tried to restore the church to the medieval appearance it once had.

== Media gallery ==
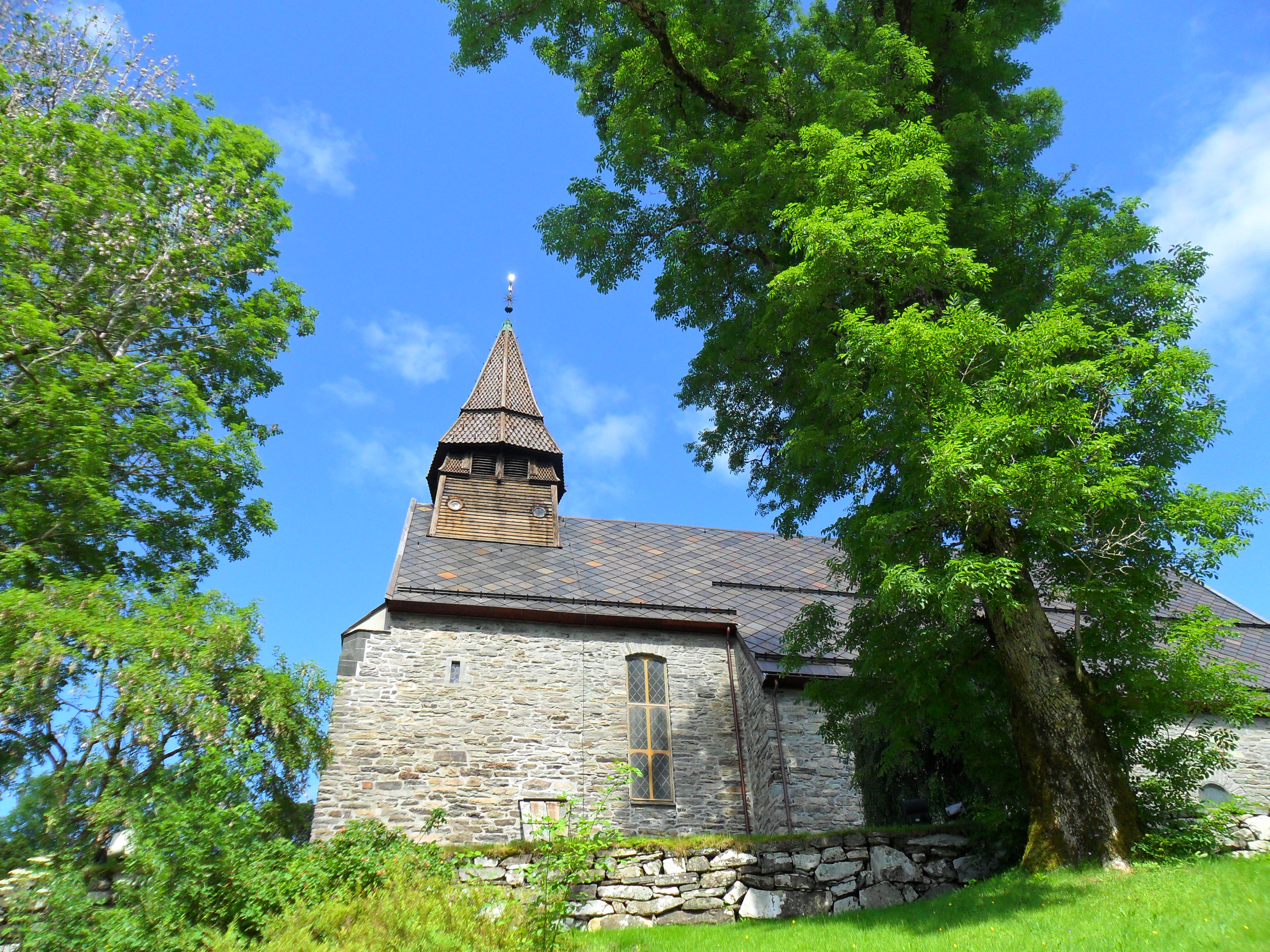
Exterior east side view

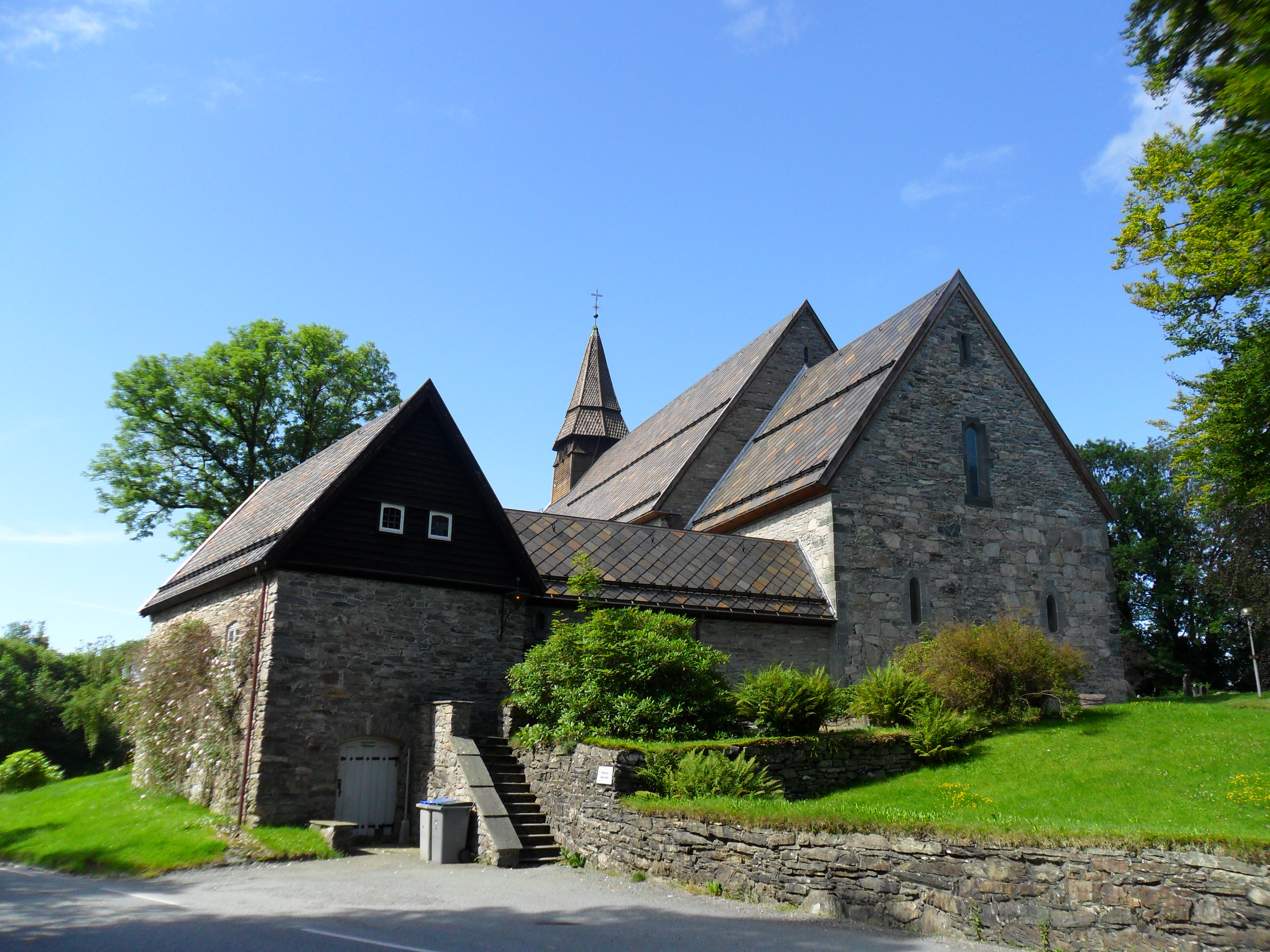
Exterior west side view

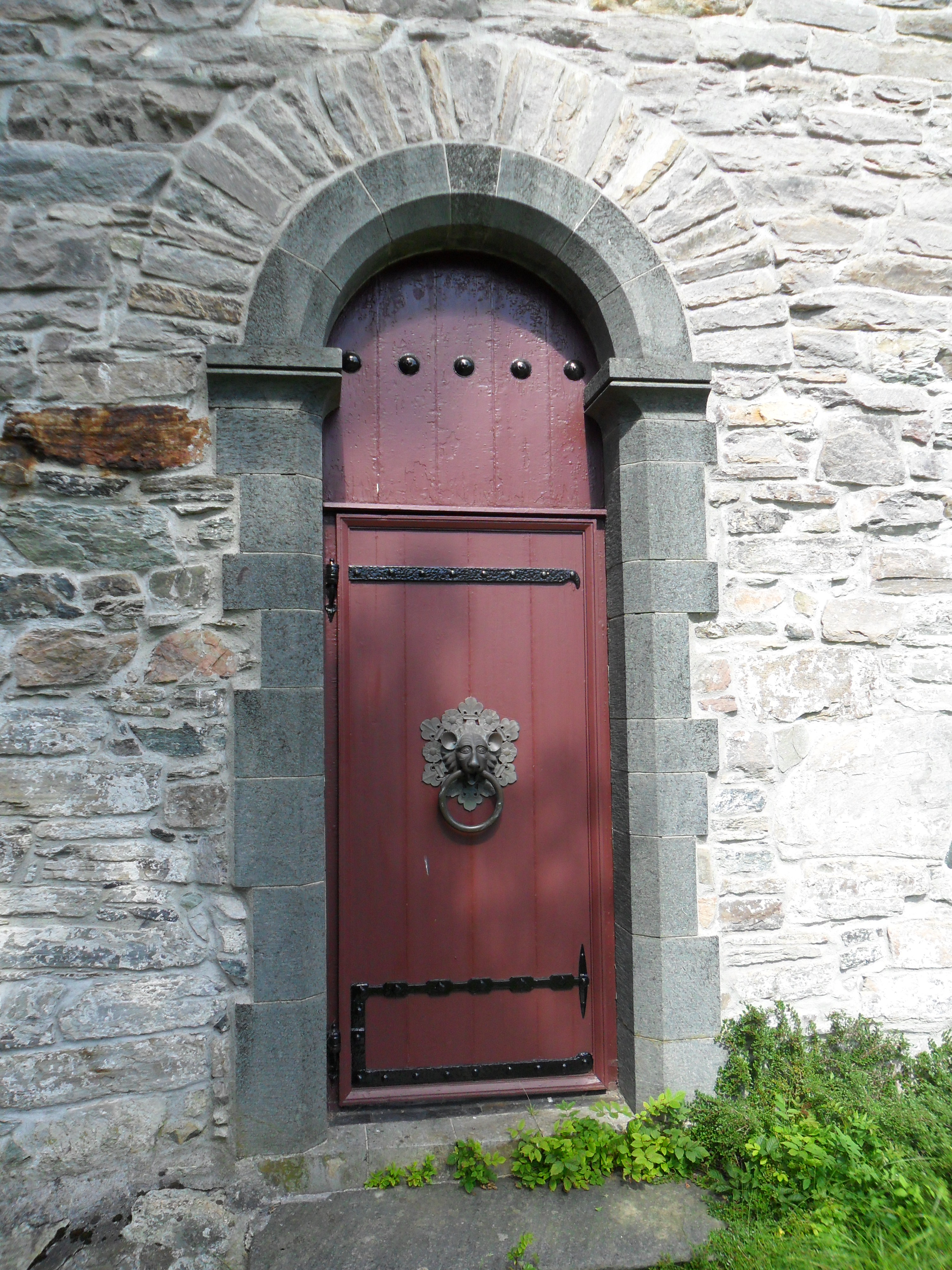
South side door

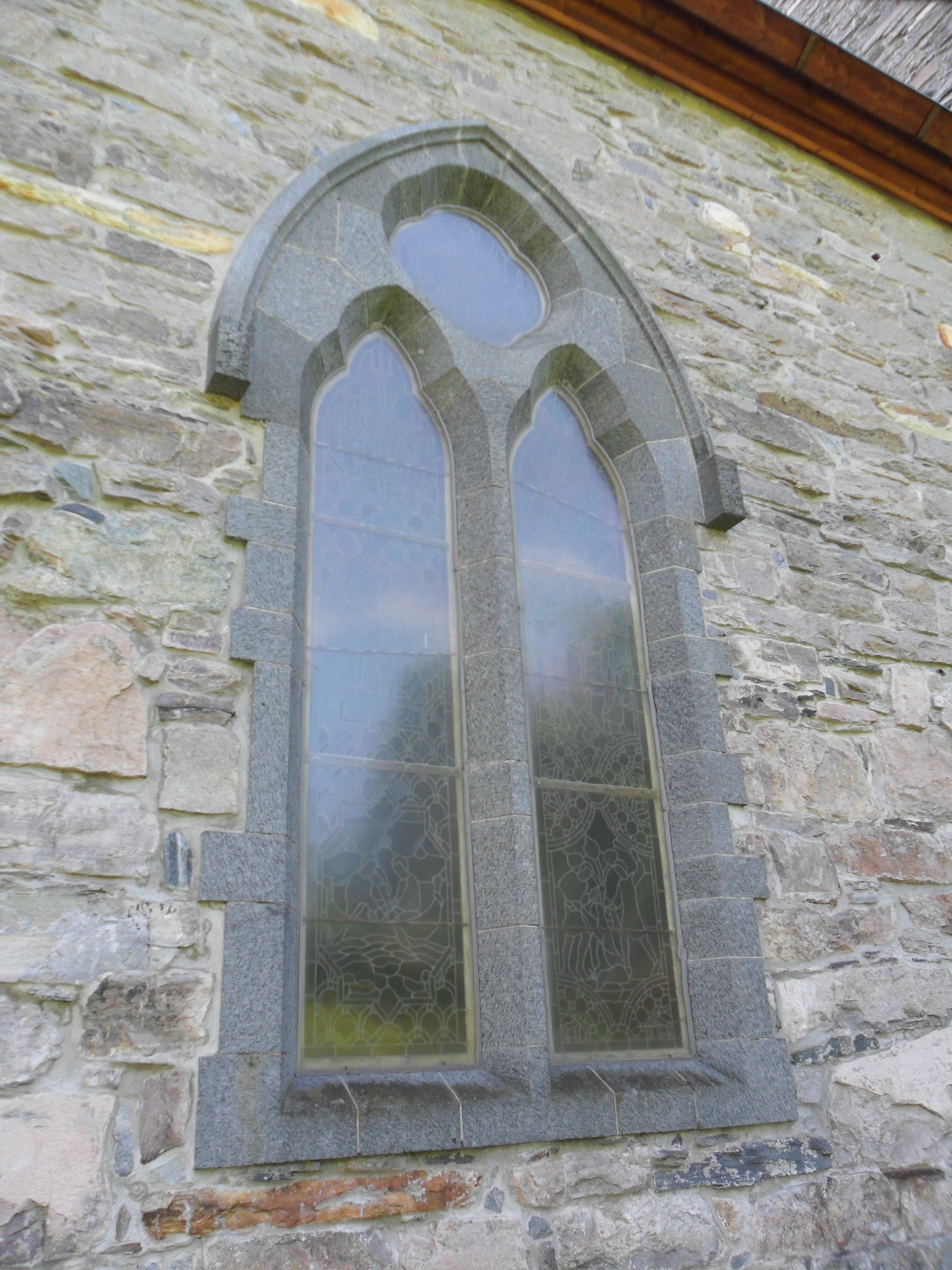
Window on south wall

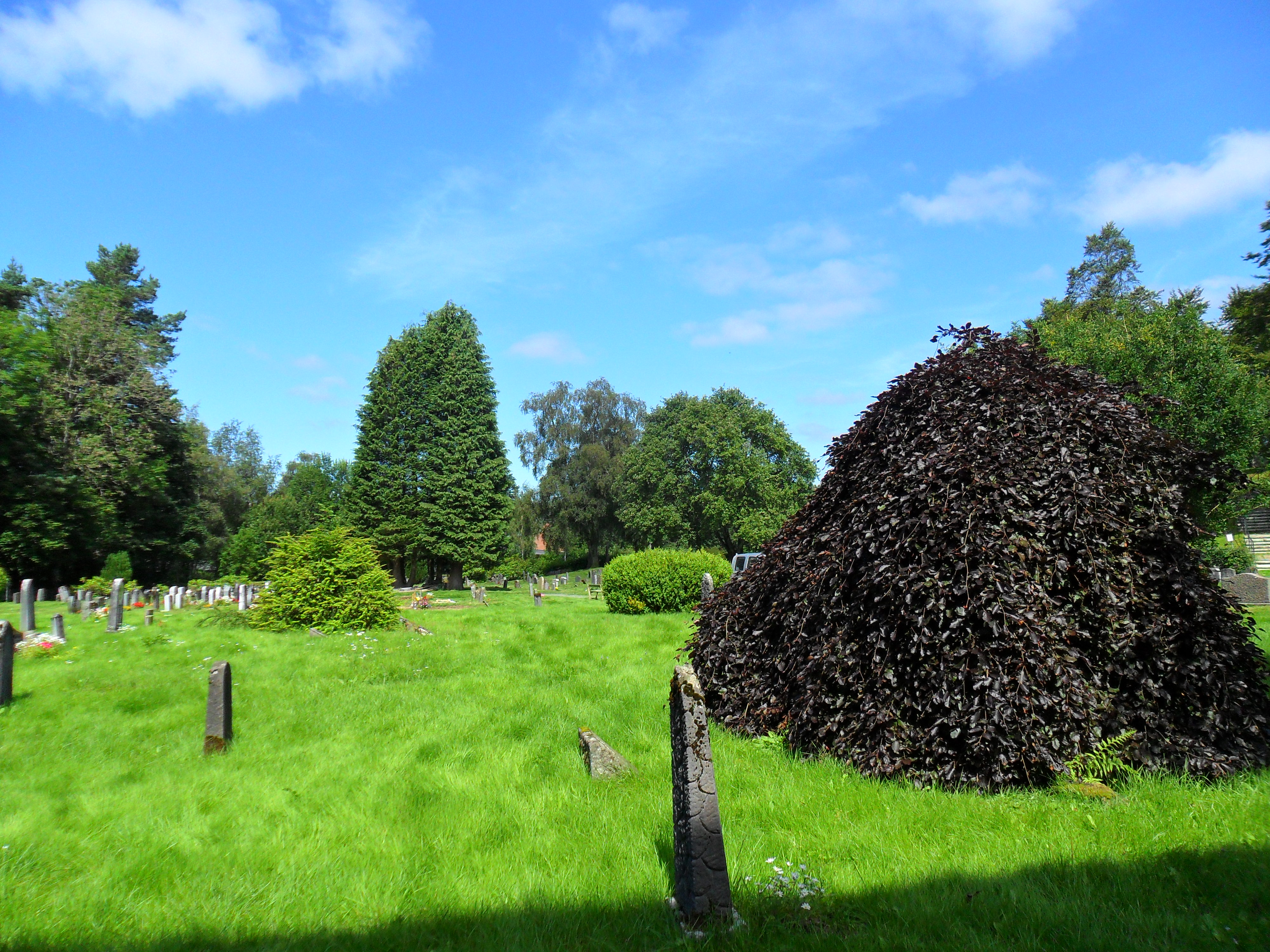
View of the church yard

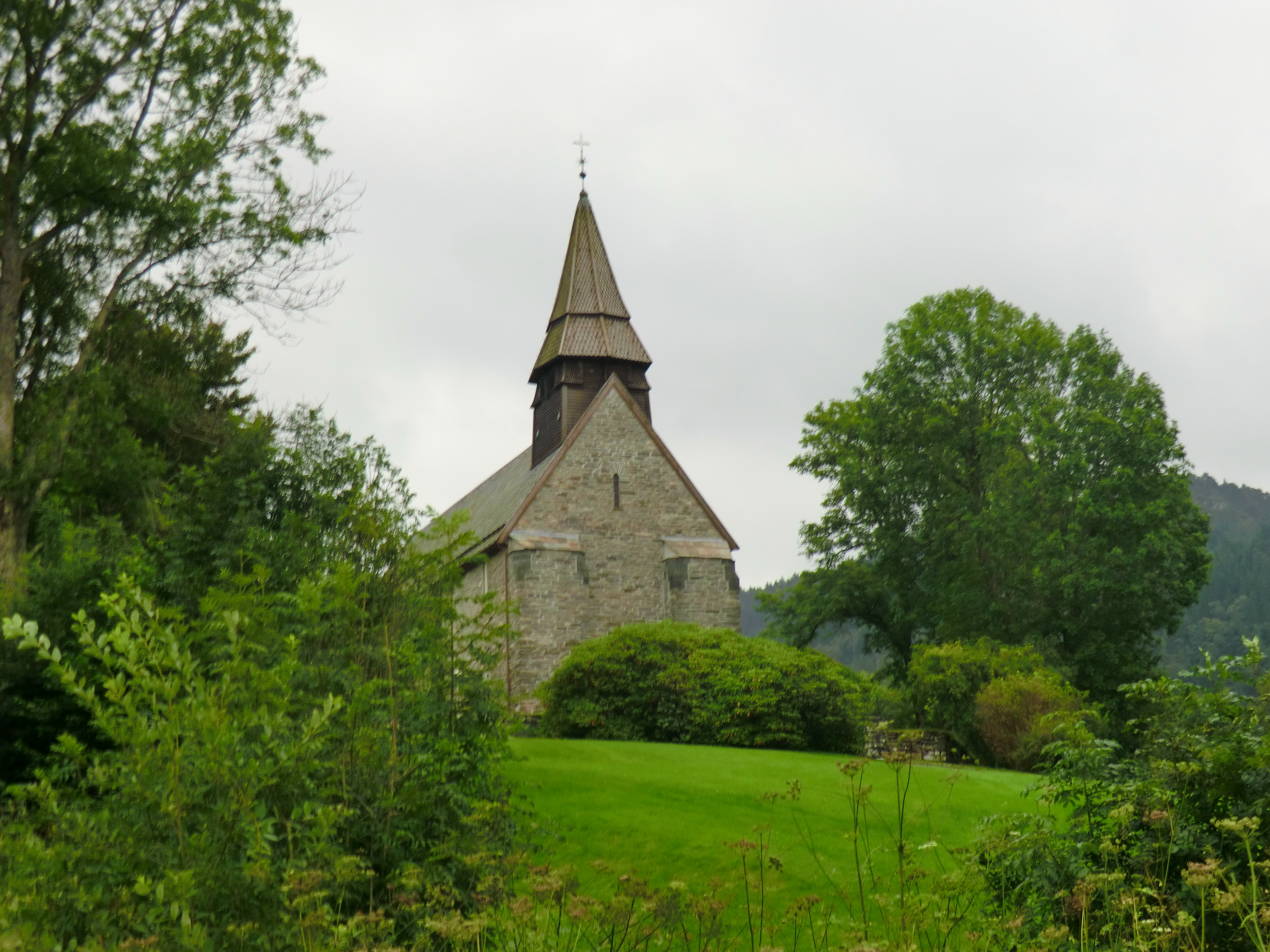
View of the front

== See also ==
- List of churches in Bjørgvin
