= Jacob Calmeyer =

Norwegian painter (1802–1883)

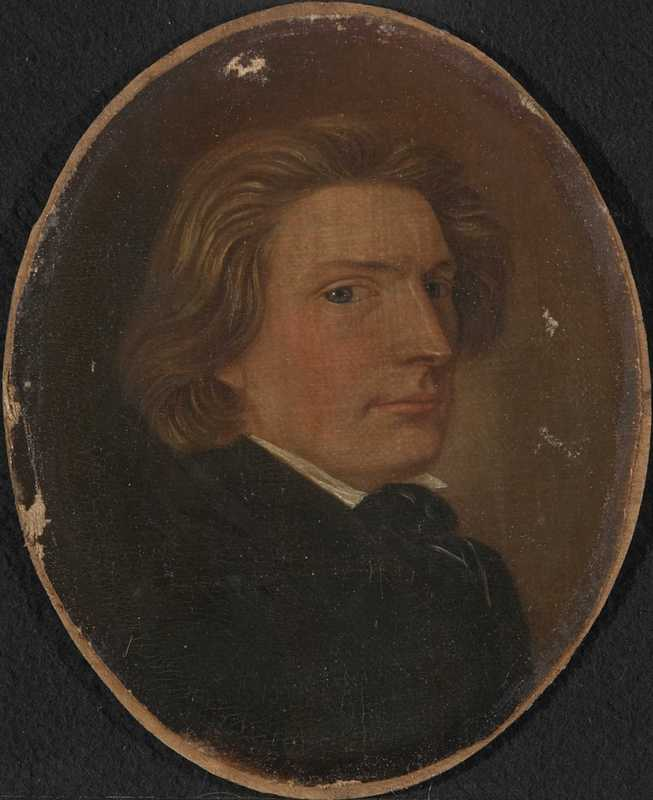
Jacob Calmeyer, self-portrait.

Jacob Mathias Calmeyer (30 October 1802 – 3 August 1883) was a Norwegian painter.

== Biography ==
He was born in Fredrikshald in Østfold, Norway. He was admitted in 1819 as part of the first class of students at the newly established Norwegian Royal Drawing School in Christiania. Among his teachers were Jacob Munch and Johannes Flintoe. Between 1821 and 1826 he was a student at the Royal Danish Academy of Fine Arts in Copenhagen where he trained under Christoffer Wilhelm Eckersberg. He was admitted to the artist guild in Bergen during 1832. In 1835 he settled in Stockholm, where he remained until at least 1839. In 1859, Calmeyer returned to Norway and settled in Christiania. His students included the painter Ragnvald Hjerlow (c. 1877).

He is represented in the National Gallery, Bergen Art Museum, National Museum and the Royal Library in Stockholm. He is represented in the National Gallery of Norway with the paintings Svartediket ved Bergen and Lysakerfossen.
