= Olav Lofthus =

Norwegian writer

- Born: 8 October 1847; Ullensvang Municipality, Norway
- Died: 10 August 1894 (aged 46)
- Occupation: Journalist
- Known for: Chief editor of Bergens Tidende
- Children: Arne Lofthus

Olav Lofthus (8 October 1847 – 10 August 1894) was a Norwegian journalist and newspaper editor.

He was born in Ullensvang Municipality, in Søndre Bergenhus, Norway. He was a student in Voss in 1861-62 and took teacher training at Stord Seminar in 1866–68. Lofthus practiced as a teacher in Vik Municipality for three years and one year in Ullensvang in the period 1862–1866. Lofthus was chief editor of the newspaper Bergens Tidende from 1872 to 1894. His collection Sange og Digte was published after his death.

He was married to Valborg Henriette Wallem (1851–1929) and was the father of painter Arne Lofthus.
