= Fanafjorden =

Fjord in Bergen, Norway

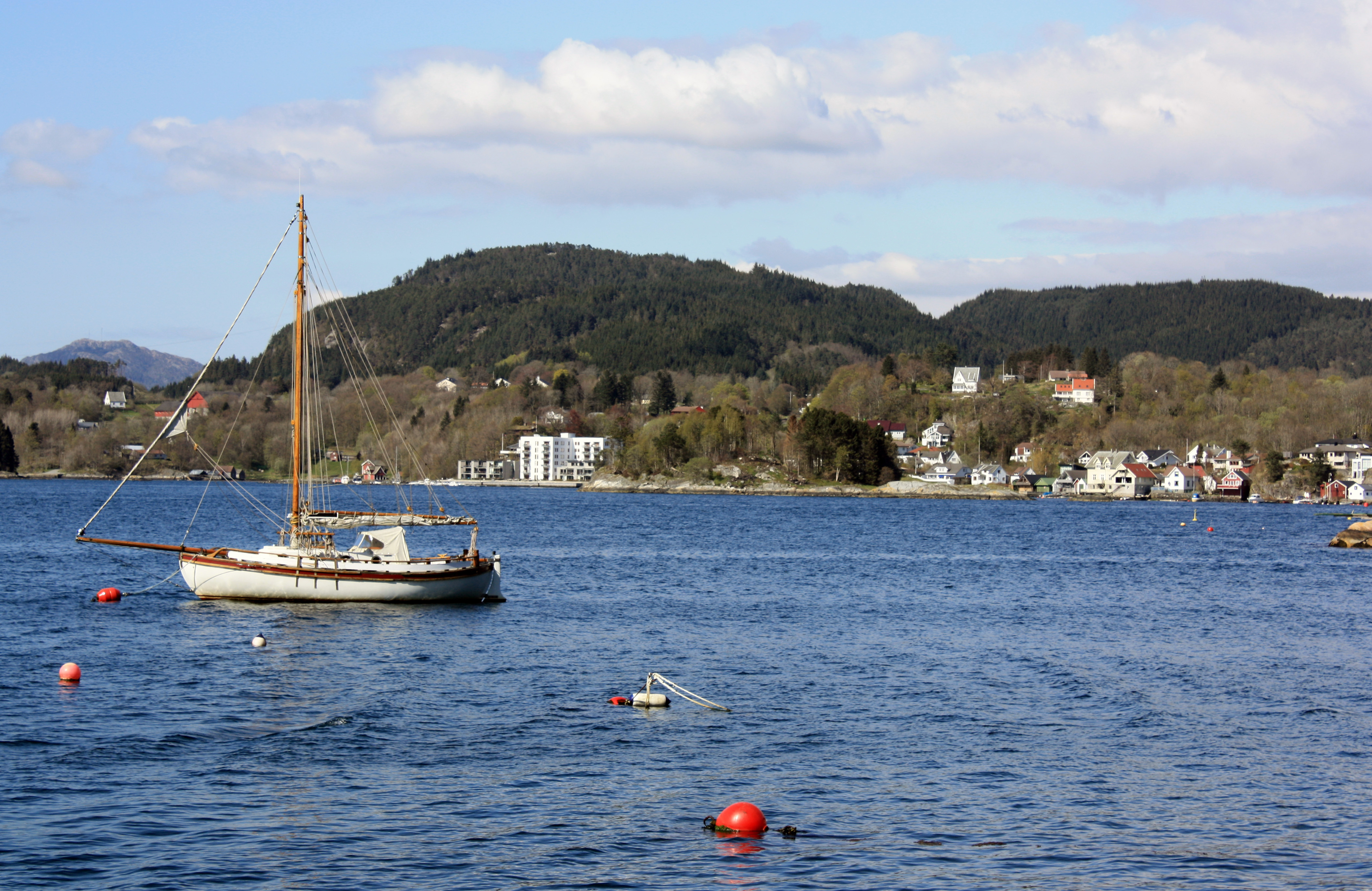
- View of the fjord and Fanahammeren
- Interactive map of Fanafjorden
- Location: Vestland county, Norway
- Coordinates: 60.23402°N 5.26529°E
- Type: Fjord
- Primary outflows: Krossfjorden
- Basin countries: Norway
- Max. length: 8.5 kilometres (5.3 mi)
- Max. depth: 160 metres (520 ft)
- Settlements: Fanahammeren

Fanafjorden is a fjord in Bergen Municipality in Vestland county, Norway. It lies about 15 kilometres (9.3 mi) south of the centre of the city of Bergen. The 8.5-kilometre (5.3 mi) long fjord is a fjord arm that branches off of the main Krossfjorden and cuts into the large Bergen Peninsula. The deepest point in the fjord reaches 160 metres (520 ft) below sea level. The fjord is located between the small Krokeide peninsula (on the south) and the village area of Milde in the borough of Ytrebygda. The fjord forms a natural boundary between the city boroughs of Fana and Ytrebygda. The urban area of Fanahammeren lies at the eastern end of the fjord.
