= Wilhelm Mohr (politician) =

Norwegian politician (1886–1978)

- Born: 11 August 1886; Fana Municipality, Norway
- Died: 1978 (aged 91–92)
- Occupations: Landowner, politician
- Children: Wilhelm Mohr
- Parent: Conrad Mohr
- Relatives: Anton Mohr (brother)
- Awards: Order of St Olav

Wilhelm Mohr (11 August 1886 – 1978) was a Norwegian landowner and politician.

== Biography ==
He was born in Fana Municipality to merchant and consul Conrad Mohr and Agnete Kroepelien, was a brother of Anton Mohr, and the father of airforce general Wilhelm Mohr. He served as mayor of Fana Municipality for two periods, and was elected to the Storting for the periods 1919–1924 and 1931–1933. He was decorated Commander of the Order of St. Olav in 1946, and was a Commander of the Order of the Dannebrog, Commander of the Order of Vasa, and Commander of the Order of the White Rose of Finland.
