= Gabriel Finne =

Norwegian writer

Edvard Gabriel Finne
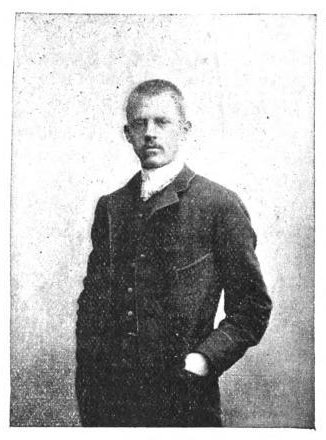
- Born: February 10, 1866; Bergen, Norway
- Died: July 3, 1899 (aged 33); Christiania (now Oslo), Norway
- Citizenship: Norwegian
- Occupations: Writer, playwright
- Spouse: Eline (Ella) Rustad
- Writing career
- Notable work: Doktor Wangs børn (Dr. Wang's Children)

Edvard Gabriel Finne (February 10, 1866 – July 3, 1899) was a Norwegian writer.

== Life and work ==
Finne was born in Bergen. He became a student in 1888, worked for a time as a journalist in Kristiania (now Oslo), and published his first novel in 1889, Filosofen (The Philosopher), with action that takes place in a literary bohemian environment. Finne's books are sparse and sharp in their highly realistic presentation, and there is an intense mood of bitterness and uneasiness in his portrayals. In the space of a few years, Finne published the novel Doktor Wangs børn (Dr. Wang's Children), the short story collection Unge syndere (Young Sinners), the novel To damer (Two Ladies), the plays Uglen (The Owl), Før afskeden (Before the Farewell), and Konny, Skuespil i tre Akter (Conny: A Play in Three Acts), and the story Rachel. Finne's bold narrative aroused an outrage, which caused the publisher to stop the sale of Unge syndere, and the book was also not well received by the public. After a few years of silence, in 1898 he published I afgrunden (In the Abyss), a series of gloomy and eerie depictions of reality with great artistic power. Finn's writing is naturalistic, both in style and attitude.

== Works ==
- Filosofen (The Philosopher, 1889)
- Doktor Wangs børn (Dr. Wang's Children, 1890)
- To damer (Two Ladies, 1891)
- Uglen (The Owl, 1893)
- Før afskeden (Before the Farewell, 1894)
- I afgrunden (In the Abyss, 1898)
