= Wilhelm Mohr (aviator) =

Norwegian aviator and officer (1917–2016)

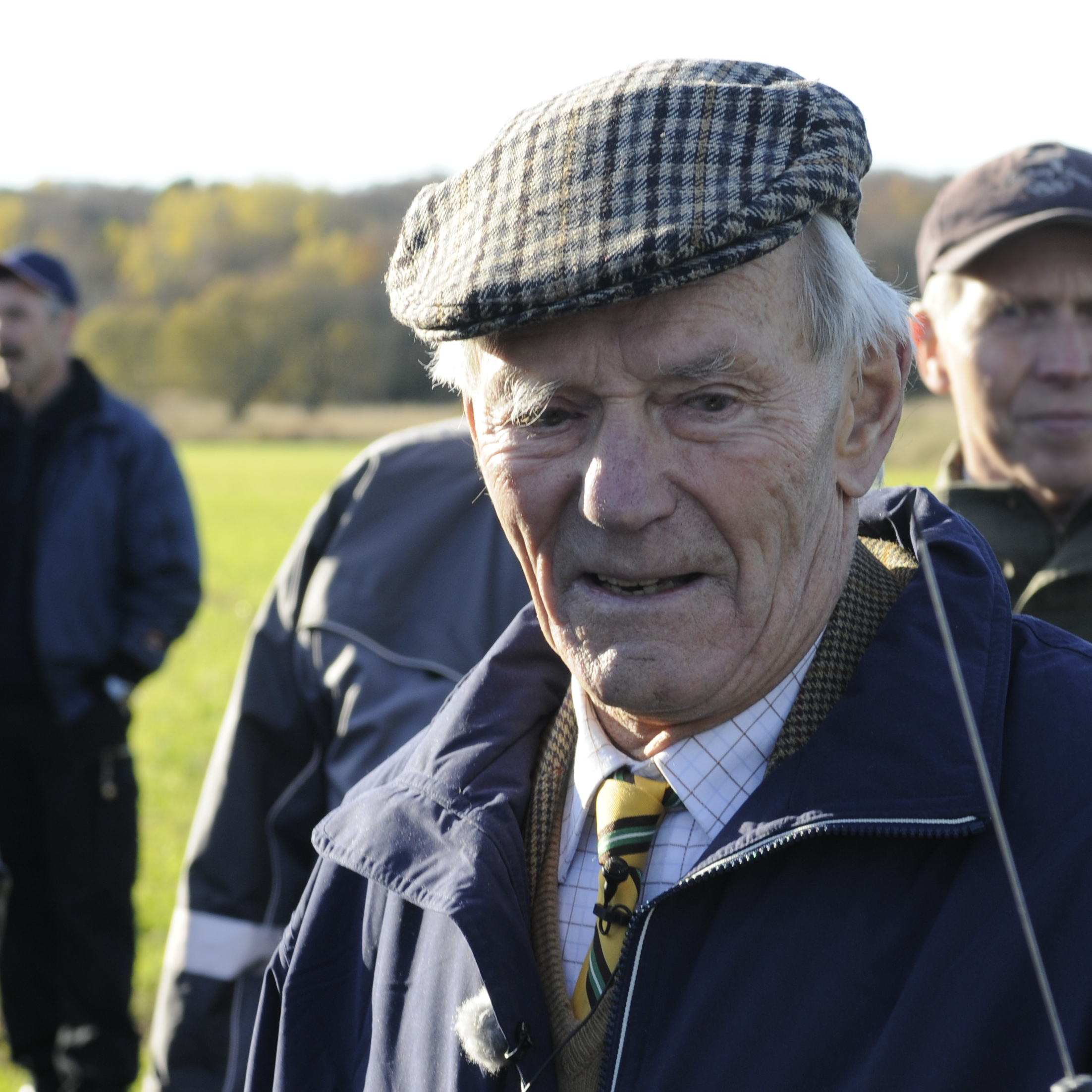
- Mohr visiting Storfosna in 2009
- Born: 27 June 1917; Fana, Norway
- Died: 26 September 2016 (aged 99)
- Parent: Wilhelm Mohr
- Relatives: Conrad Mohr (grandfather); Anton Mohr (uncle)

Wilhelm Mohr (27 June 1917 – 26 September 2016) was a Norwegian aviation officer.

He was born in Fana to landowner Wilhelm Mohr and Emily Holm, and was a grandson of grain merchant Conrad Mohr. He served as aviation officer during the Second World War, both in the Norwegian Campaign and later in Little Norway in Canada, and with the No. 332 Squadron RAF. He was promoted Major General in 1962, and Lieutenant General in 1964, and served as head of the Royal Norwegian Air Force. He was decorated Commander of the Order of St. Olav in 1964. His war decorations include the War Cross with sword, the British Distinguished Flying Cross, and the American Legion of Merit.

He died on 26 September 2016, 99 years old.
