= Anton Christian Houen =

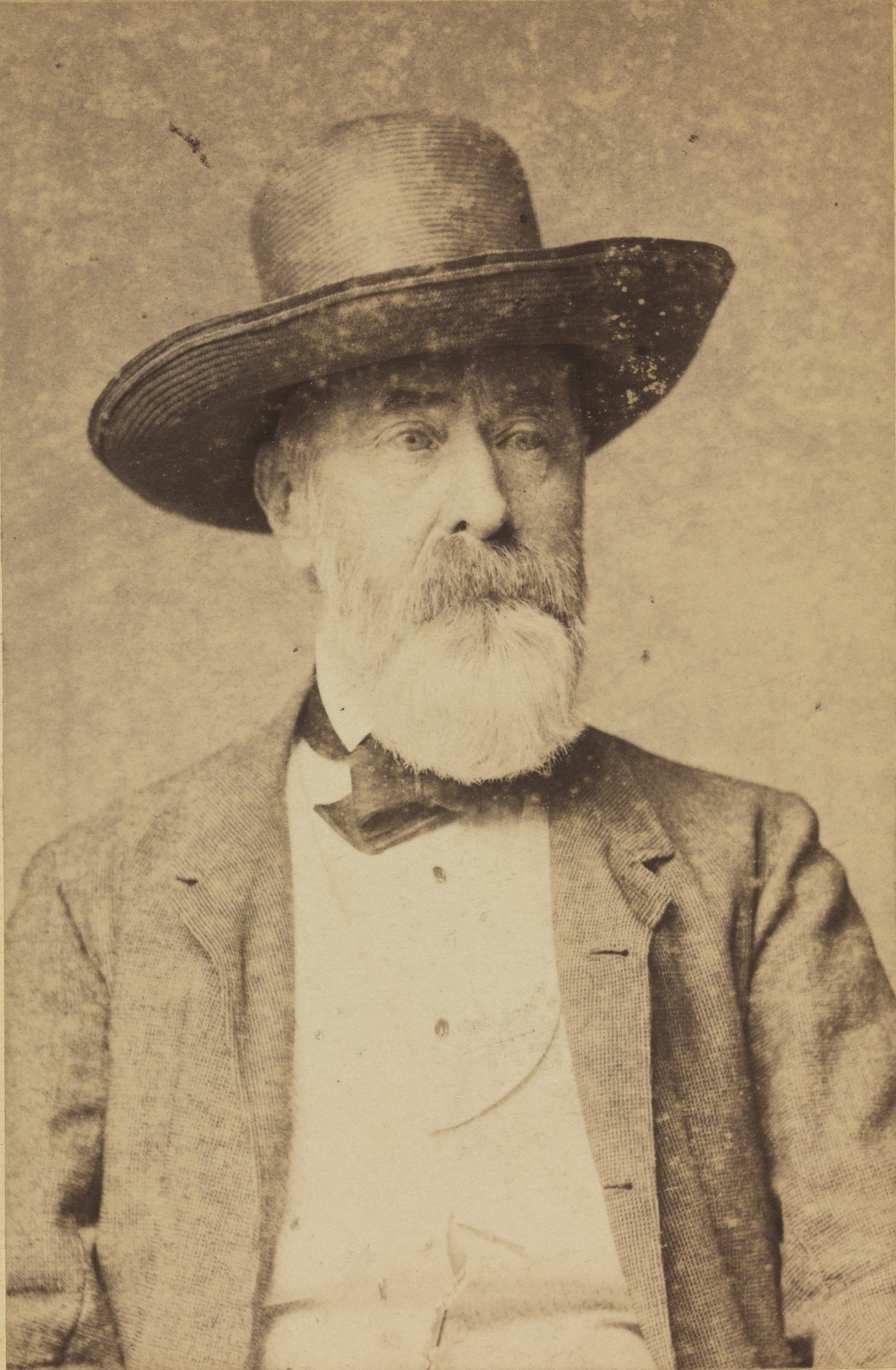
- Born: September 18, 1823; Arendal, Norway
- Died: July 26, 1894 (aged 70); Lausanne, Switzerland
- Years active: 1845–1873
- Known for: Business, philanthropy

Anton Christian Houen (September 18, 1823 – July 26, 1894) was a Norwegian teacher, philanthropist, and businessman. He was named a commander of the Order of St. Olav in 1892.

== Life ==
Houen was born in Arendal, the son of Ole Houen and Christiane Margarete Hoelfeldt Ellefsen Lund, and the brother of Christopher Holfeldt-Houen. His father was a teacher at Arendal Secondary School, but later became a merchant. At age 15 Houen left Norway, and in 1845 he started his own company in Newcastle upon Tyne, England, where he traded with various countries around the Mediterranean. There he married Mary Ann Tompson, and together they had four children. He retired at age 50 with a considerable fortune, and he spent most of his last years in Florence, Italy.

Houen donated many large sums of money for various purposes in Norway, including a major sum for Fridtjof Nansen's Fram expedition of 1893–1896, the National Gallery, and a new organ in Trinity Church in his hometown of Arendal, which could not afford the new organ because of bankruptcy in 1886. He also created the Houen Margarete Foundation (Houenske Margaretastiftelse), to which he donated NOK 200,000 to create an old age home in memory of his mother, the A. C. Houen Grant, which grants scholarships to Norwegian researchers, and artists, and the Houen Foundation Award (Houens Fonds diploma), an architectural award.

Houen died in Lausanne, Switzerland.

== Legacy ==
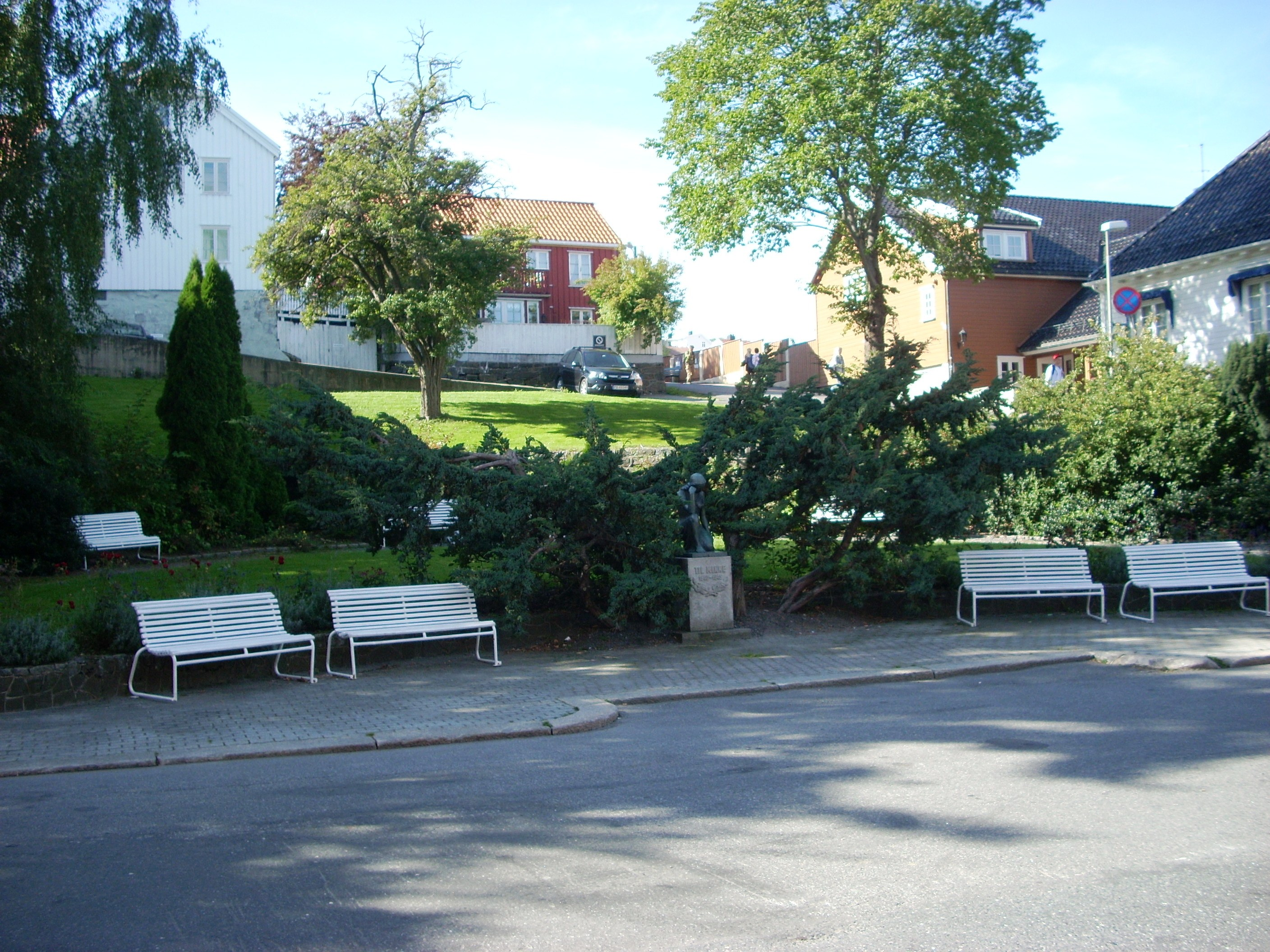
Anton Christian Houen Square (Anton Chr Houens plass) in Arendal

In gratitude for Houen's donation to the Fram expedition, Houen Island (Norwegian: Houens Ø, Russian: Гоуэн) in Franz Josef Land was named after him.

In Arendal, Anton Christian Houen Square (Anton Chr Houens plass) is named after Houen. The square is located in front of Trinity Church and serves as a memorial for the fallen from Arendal during the Second World War.
