= Fanahammeren =

Coordinates: 60.2634°N 5.3457°E

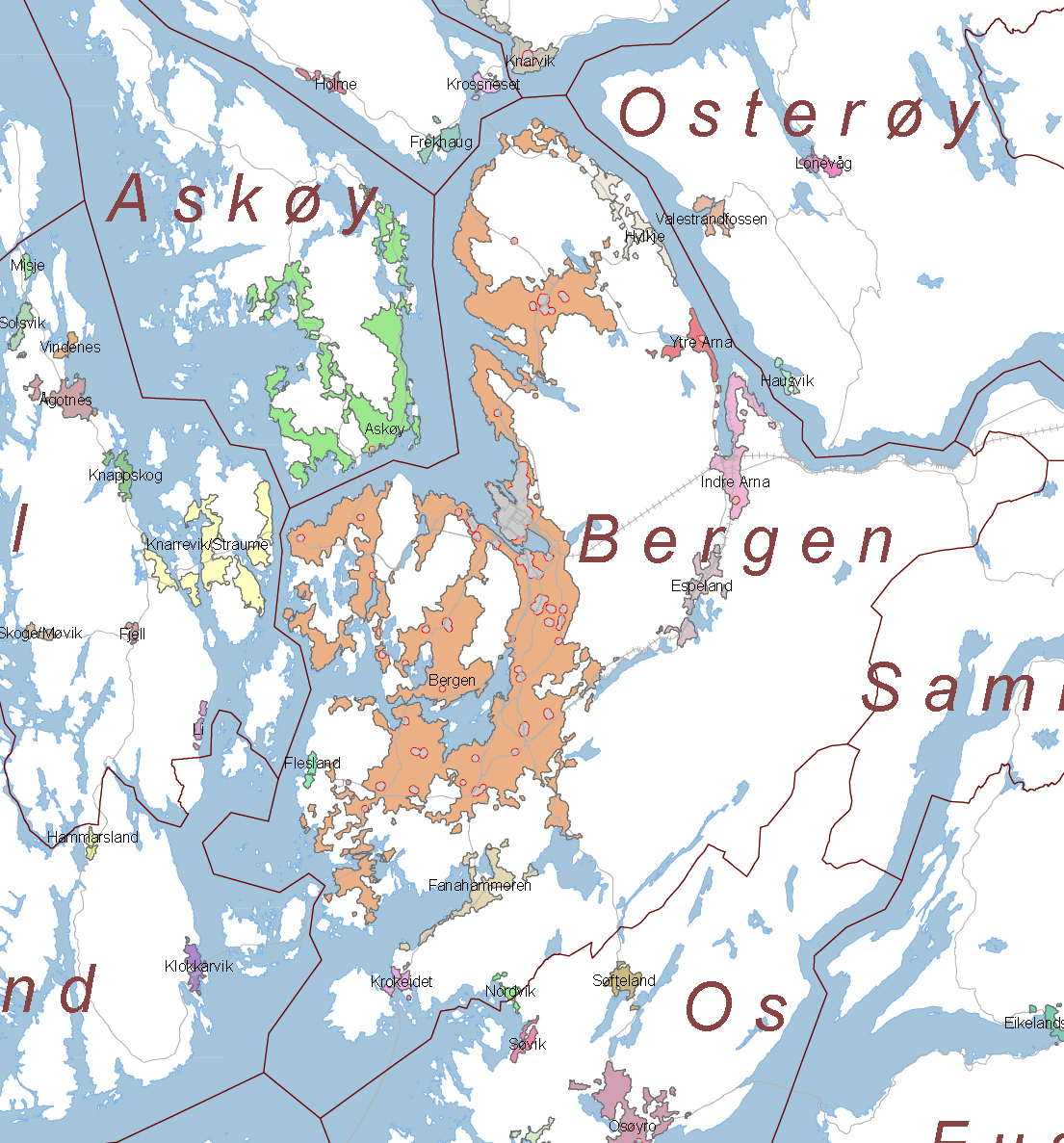
Location of Fanahammeren in Bergen.

Fanahammeren or Fanahammaren is a residential village area at the eastern end of the Fanafjorden in the city of Bergen in Vestland county, Norway. Fanahammeren lies about 15 kilometres (9.3 mi) south of the city centre. The historic Fana Church is located here.

The 2.78-square-kilometre (690-acre) village area has a population (2012) of 3,690, giving the village a population density of 1,327 inhabitants per square kilometre (3,440/sq mi).
