= Milde, Bergen =

Neighborhood in Bergen, Norway

Coordinates: 60.2541°N 5.2570°E

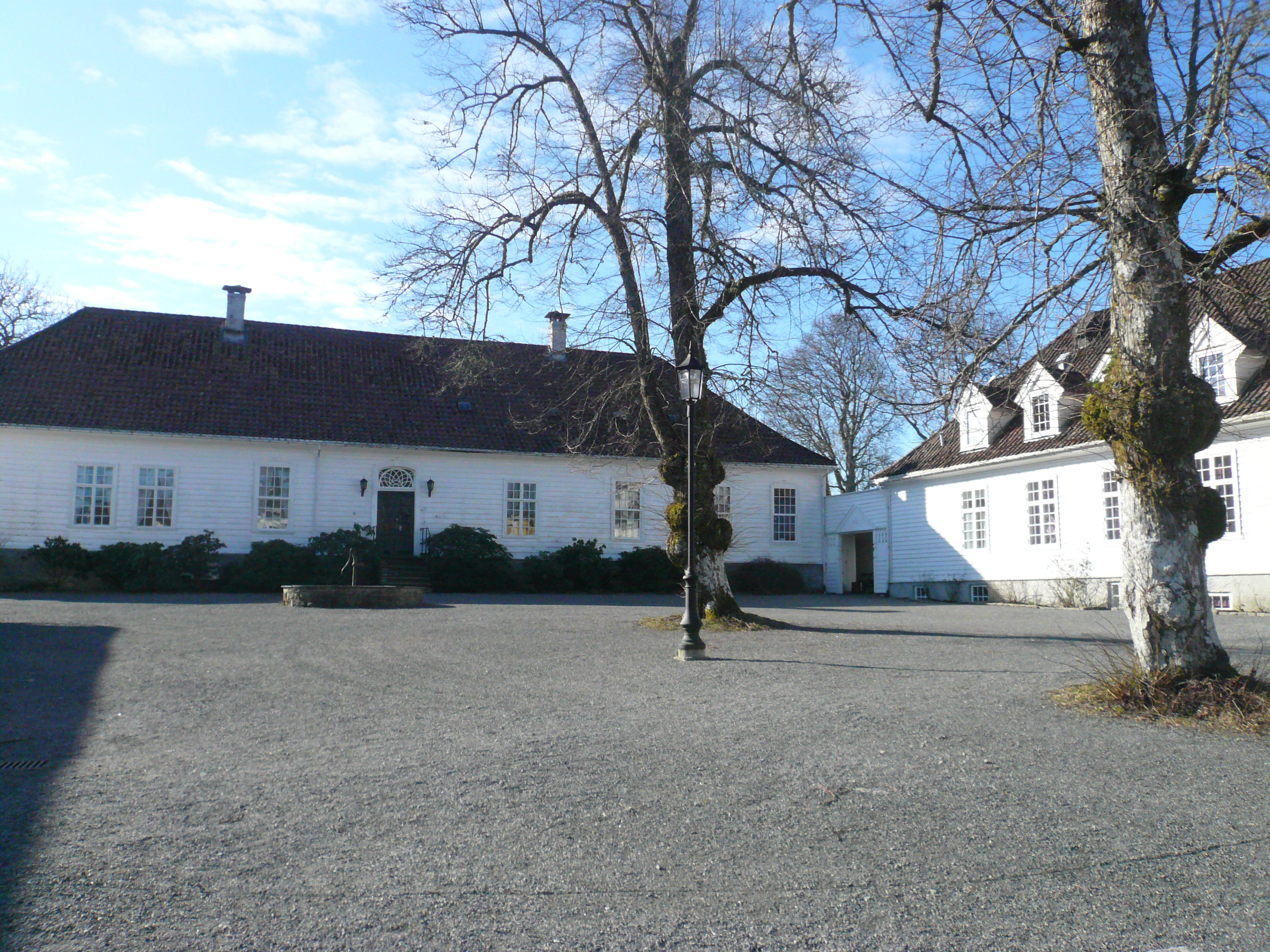
Store Milde

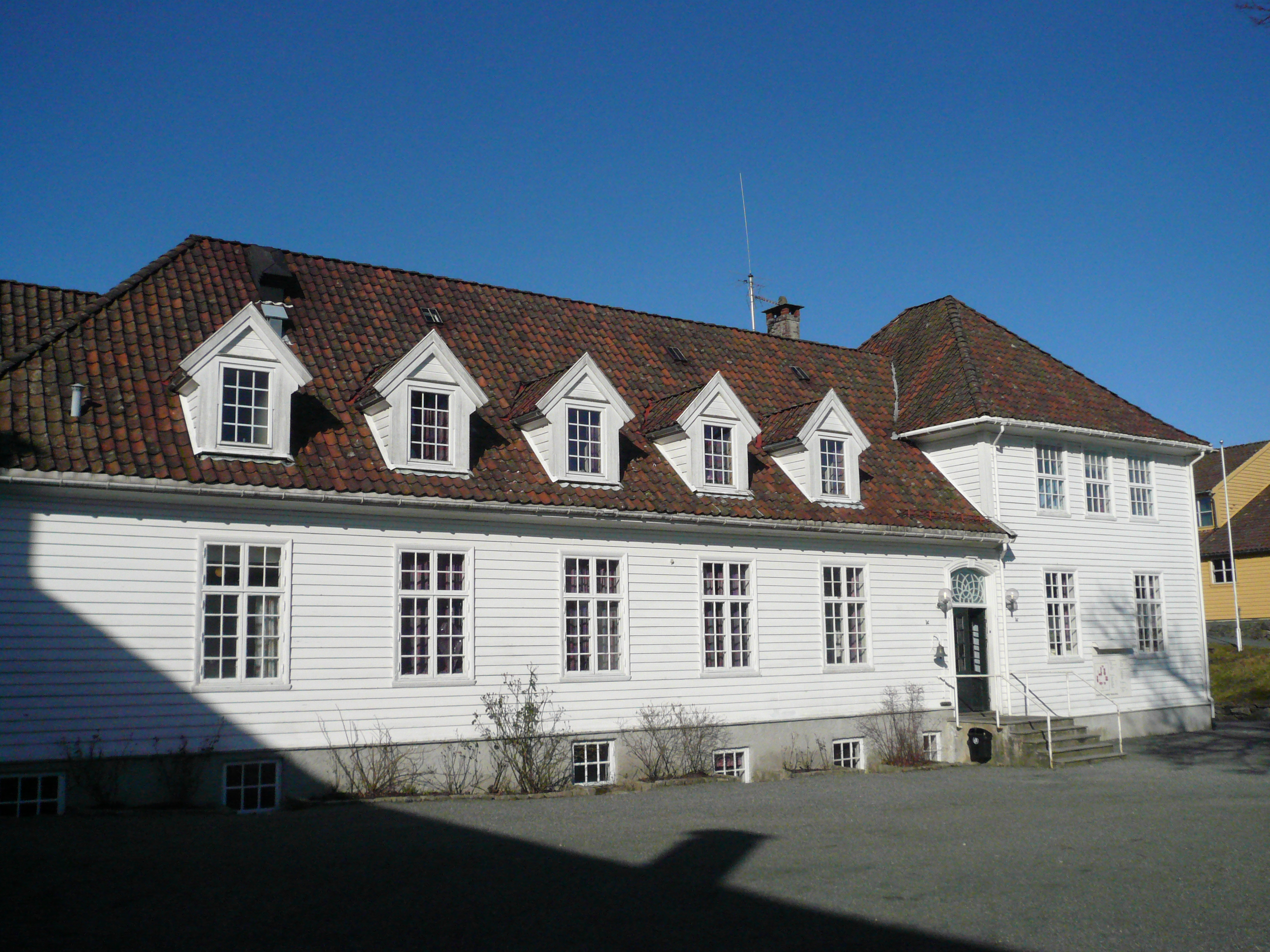
Ole Landmark design from 1917

Milde is a neighbourhood in the city of Bergen in Vestland county, Norway.

Milde is situated in the borough of Ytrebygda about 20 kilometres (12 mi) south of the city centre of Bergen and about 2 kilometres (1.2 mi) southeast of the village area of Hjellestad on the other side of the peninsula. As a basic statistical unit Milde had a population of 516 as of 1 January 2008.

Milde has been settled for a long time, there being evidence of cultivation of grain since around the year 100 AD, while the cultural landscape dates back to around the year 200 BC. Milde peninsula has been surrounded by water on all sides since 1996, when a channel was built between the bays of Vågsbøpollen and Vestrepollen. Arboretum and Botanical Garden of Bergen is located in Milde.

The modern neighborhood is built upon the lands of the two farms that historically have made up Milde: Store Milde and Lille Milde. The original farm was first recorded circa 1530 and was subsequently divided into two parcels, although ownership largely remained undivided until 1816. Toward the end of the Middle Ages, the property belonged to the Dominican convent in Bergen. The farms were in royal ownership from 1624 to 1639.

== Store Milde ==
Store Milde is a manor house located on Hjellestad peninsula in the borough of Fana, on the north side of Fanafjorden. The manor house reached its present size during the second half of the 1600s. Bergen merchant Sander Janson (1595-1649) owned Milde from 1639. It is probable that he expanded the main building into a manor house with a landscaped garden. In 1723, the farms were foreclosed by Henrich Henrichsen Weinwich (1676-1733). Weinwich probably rebuilt part of the main building. The manor house was rebuilt in the Rococo style around 1784, when Johan Frederik Cappe (1742–1817) owned Store Milde. In 1909 Store Milde was taken over by the municipality of Fana. In 1916, architect Ole Landmark designed a restoration. Store Milde has been protected by under Norwegian Cultural Heritage since 1924.
