= Strandgaten, Bergen =

Street in Bergen, Norway

Coordinates: 60.3958°N 5.3173°E

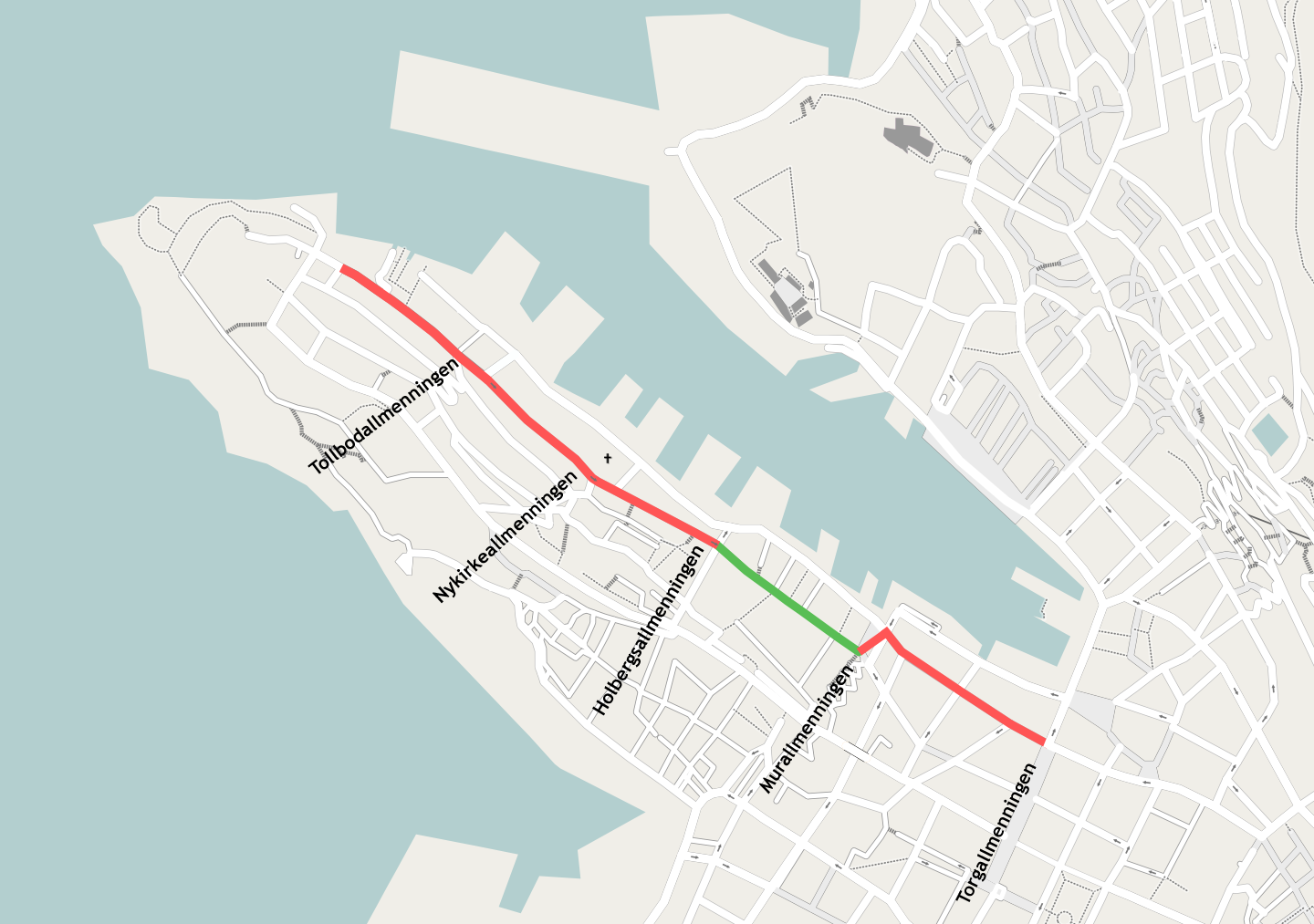
A map of Strandgaten. The pedestrianised part is green.

Strandgaten is a street in the city centre of Bergen, Norway, west of the bay of Vågen. It starts at Torgallmenningen and follows the eastern shore of the Nordnes peninsula to Tidemands gate, where it becomes Nordnesgaten. The easternmost quarter of Strandgaten is a regular two-way street, while it is an eastbound one-way street between Tollbodallmenningen and Holbergsallmenningen, and between Østre Murallmenningen and Torgallmenningen. Between Holbergsallmenningen and Østre Murallmenningen the street is pedestrianised. In total, Strandgaten is approximately 1.2 km long.

== History ==
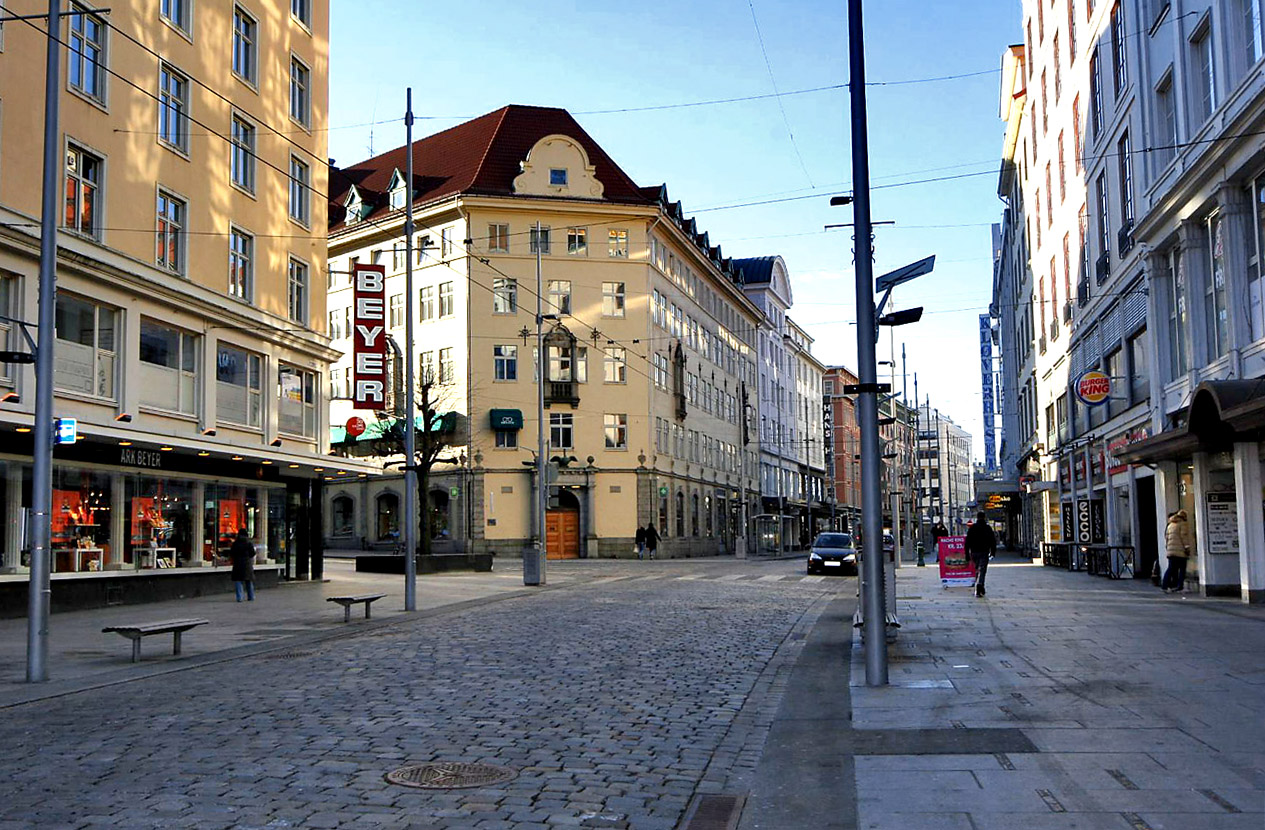
View of eastern Strandgaten from Torgallmenningen

The street was officially named "Strandgaten" in 1857, although it had gone by that name for a very long time prior to this. During the 12th century, the area around the eastern part of Strandgaten changed from a rural area dominated by Munkeliv Abbey and St. John's Priory, to a centre for trade of goods. After one of the many great fires that throughout the centuries have ravaged Bergen destroyed the easternmost part of Strandgaten in 1561, Erik Rosenkrantz, governor of Bergenhus len, ordered the creation of a broad street (an "allmenning") which would prevent future fires from spreading. Torgallmenningen (formerly Vågsallmenningen), Vetrlidsallmenningen, Korskirkeallmenningen, and many other streets in the old part of Bergen were created for the same reason. The street, formerly known as "Rosenkrantz' allmenning", is now known as "Murallmenningen". The origin of the name is the personal residence of Rosenkrantz, which he built there shortly after the fire. This building, known as "Muren" or "Murhvelvingen", has been used for a number of different purposes throughout history, and is currently home to the Buekorps Museum.

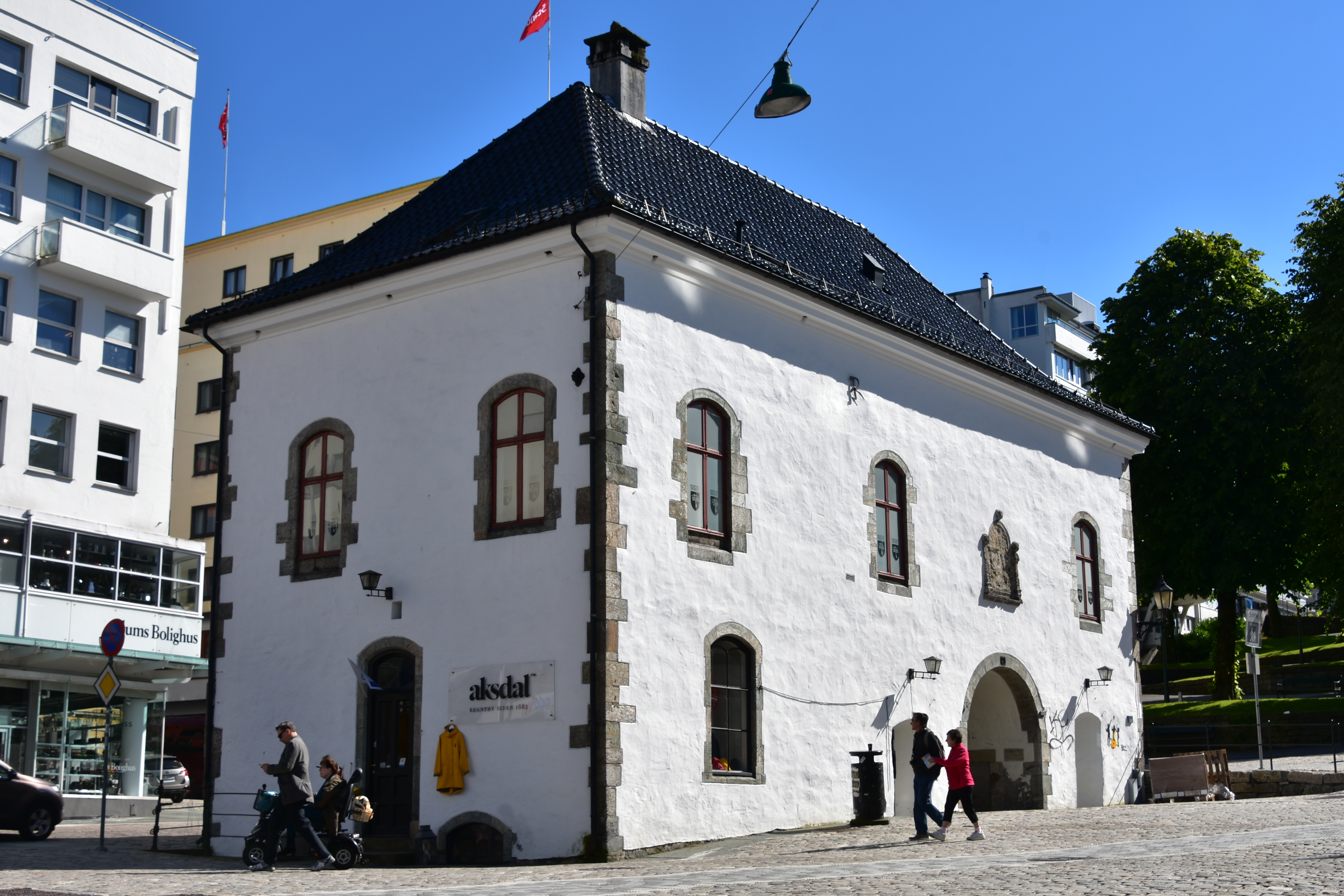
Murhvelvingen at Østre Murallmenning, where the Buekorps Museum is located

The area between Torgallmenningen and Østre Murallmenningen was destroyed in the Bergen fire of 1916. The reconstruction plans included a new street layout, which better conformed to the ideals of the era, rather than those of 1756, when the area had last burned. The streets were straightened and widened. Strandgaten was no exception; its eastern end was moved southwards, while its western end was moved northwards. Smørsallmenningen, a street which had intersected Strandgaten, was removed.

The Jewish community in Bergen consisted of around 60 persons in the years before World War II, who in total owned six retail stores in Strandgaten. Because of the deportation of the Jews only one store remained after the war, and with new owners. During the war, British bombers destroyed many of the wooden houses on Nordnes. On 20 April 1944, the German steam trawler Voorbode, loaded with dynamite, exploded in Vågen, and destroyed the area around Tollboden and Nykirken, as well as a large number of houses in the surrounding neighbourhoods and on the other side of the bay.

The war was followed by a period of reconstruction and re-purposing. There were plans to tear down several of the old neighbourhoods in central Bergen, including Marken and most of the neighbourhoods on the Nordnes peninsula, including Strandgaten west of Østre Murallmenningen. The plans were abandoned by the city government in 1974. However, the north-eastern part of the Nordnes peninsula, including about half of Strandgaten, which had been the most damaged during World War II, was cleared out and the ruins and remaining buildings were replaced with large apartment buildings. The stretch of Strandgaten between Murallmenningen and Hobergsallmenningen, was spared. It was pedestrianised in 1971, and is now known as "Gågaten", literally "the walking street".

== Buildings ==
The easternmost part of Strandgaten was completely destroyed in the fire of 1916. Before the fire most of the area's buildings were small, with two or three floors. The post-fire buildings, constructed between 1919 and 1939, were large commercial buildings with upwards of 6 floors. Many different architectural styles are represented among the buildings in this part of Strandgaten, ranging from the Neo-baroque Svaneapoteket (Strandgaten 6 and 8), which, having been finished in 1920, was the first building constructed after the fire, to functionalist buildings, e.g. Strandgaten 20. Many important Bergen architects designed buildings in this part of Strandgaten, including Einar Oscar Schou, who had also designed Den Nationale Scene, Finn Berner (the building on the corner with Torgallmenningen, which was his design), Fredrik Arnesen and Arthur Darre Kaarbø, Sigurd Lunde, Ingolf Danielsen, Leif Grung, and Per Grieg.

The pedestrianised section has mainly smaller buildings with 2-4 floors, built before the 20th century. Significant buildings include Strandgaten 59, the former building of Sundt & Co, today located at Torgallmenningenn, and Tetingsalen (Strandgaten 53), a former brewery, public house, concert hall, theatre, and today retail store. The western half of Strandgaten, west of Holbergsallmenningen, was rebuilt after World War II. The church of Nykirken is located here, one of the few buildings on the north-eastern shore of the Nordnes peninsula to have been preserved. The home of Edvard Grieg's family, where he grew up, was located in this part of Strandgaten, but it was destroyed when the steam trawler Voorbode exploded in 1944. The ruins of Ludvig Holberg's childhood home were, too, located by Strandgaten, until they were removed in 1985. Near the northern end of the street are the main offices of the Norwegian Directorate of Fisheries.

== Commerce ==
Strandgaten is one of the busiest shopping streets in Bergen. The pedestrianised section has a number of smaller shops, but has also seen the establishing of several chain stores, while the easternmost section is home to the shopping centre Kløverhuset, founded in 1988, and various Norwegian and international chain stores.
