= St. John's Priory, Bergen =

Monastery in Bergen, Norway

St. John's Priory, Bergen (Jonsklosteret i Bergen) was a house of Augustinian Canons located in Bergen, Norway.

== History ==
St. John's Prior was situated in the vicinity of the present Strandgaten-Tårnplass streets in the center of Bergen. It may possibly have been an abbey or monastery. However most houses of Augustinian Canons were priories about which there is not a great deal of recorded information. There is no certainty on the foundation date of St. John's, but it is generally assumed that it was established about the middle of the 12th century, although its existence is not recorded until 1208. It was dedicated to Saint John the Baptist.

Throughout the 14th century St. John's seems to have suffered financial problems. The community gradually dwindled during the 15th century. In 1450 its property was transferred to the cathedral chapter of Bergen. In 1489, this part of the city suffered a serious fire, in which it seems that the monastery too burnt down. The church however survived and gifts to it are recorded in the wills of Bergen citizens up to 1517. In 1552, the city of Bergen obtained the right to use the site of the church and churchyard to build a town hall, although the project never came about. After several fires the church was in ruins, and by the end of the 18th century nothing at all remained standing.

Some cellars from St. John's did survive into the 19th century. Norwegian antiquarian Lorentz Diderich Klüwer sketched a plan of the building remains in 1823. During building excavations in 1895 the remains of the priory church were accidentally uncovered, and it was thus possible to locate more precisely. The churchyard was to the north and east of the church, towards Strandgaten in the city center of Bergen. It seems unlikely that there are now any further remains of these buildings to be found.

== Other sources ==
- Lidén, Hans-Emil, and Magerøy, Ellen Maria (1980) Norges kirker, Bergen, vol I, pp. 142–144. Oslo ISBN 82-05-12367-5 (in Norwegian)
