= Swan pharmacy =

Coordinates: 60°23′37.64″N 5°19′23.45″E

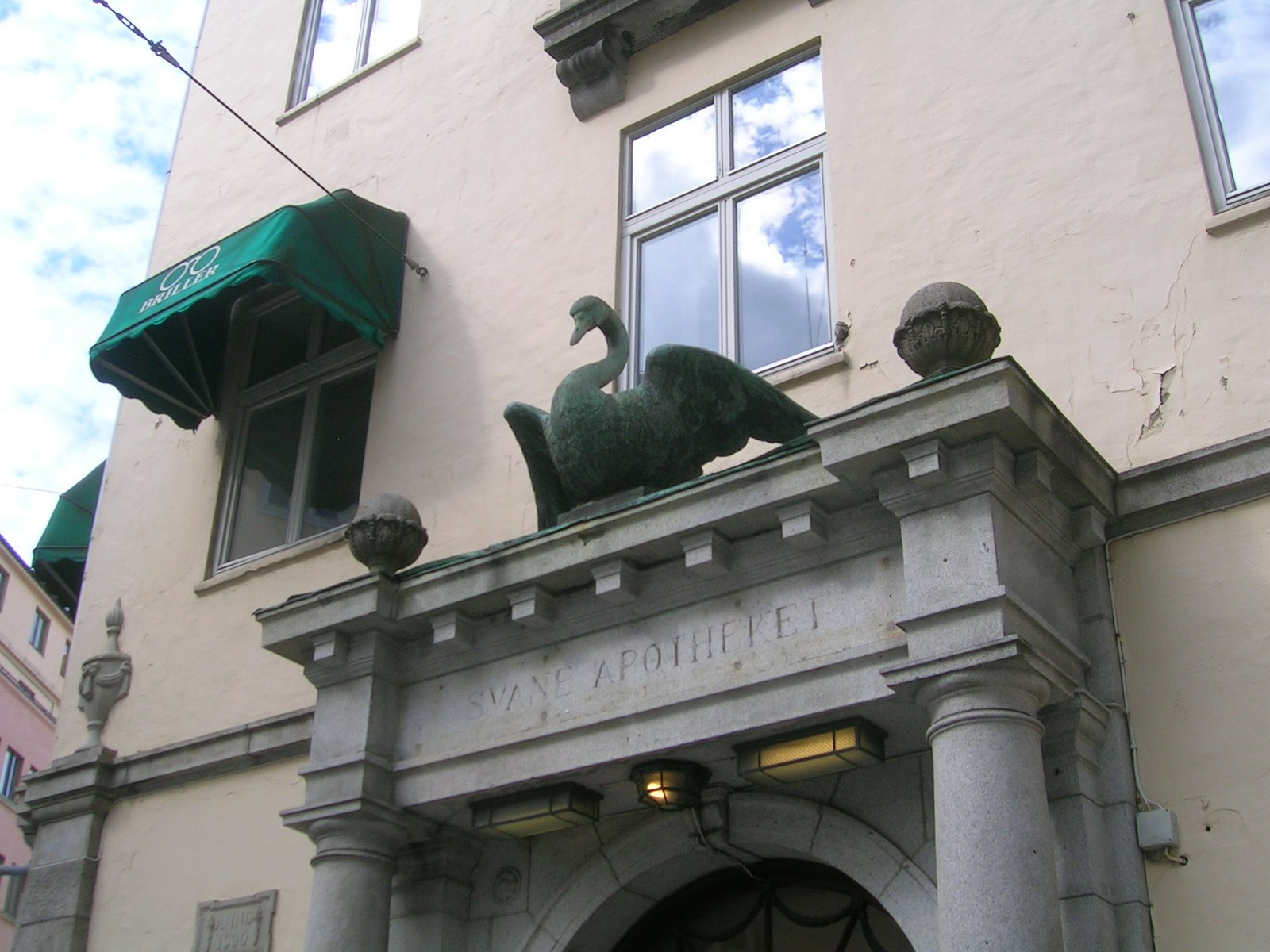
The Swan over the entrance

Swan pharmacy or Svaneapoteket in Bergen, Norway is the oldest pharmacy in Norway. It was established in 1595. The original building burned down in a fire in 1916 and it was rebuilt by the architects Fredrik Arnesen and Darre Kaarbø. A replica of the metal swan at the entrance still stands above its entrance in Strandgaten.

Bergen was a pioneer town where people went to make wealth by fishing or working in the timber or fur industry. The first pharmacist to work there was the Dutchman Lambert Gregerson Friis and he was shortly joined by another Dutch apothecary Nicolas de Freundt who also had no formal training but applied for a permit to Christian IV. The permits was received in December 13, 1595 by Freundt who was given the right to start two pharmacies which were sold some years later but only the Swan pharmacy remained and moved to Danish hands. A second Swan apothecary was opened in Oslo by Dane Baltsar Brabant in 1628. The swan was a symbol of intelligence and purity and was widely used symbols by medieval apothecaries in Finland and Denmark. The building is now a part of the pharmacy chain Apotek 1.

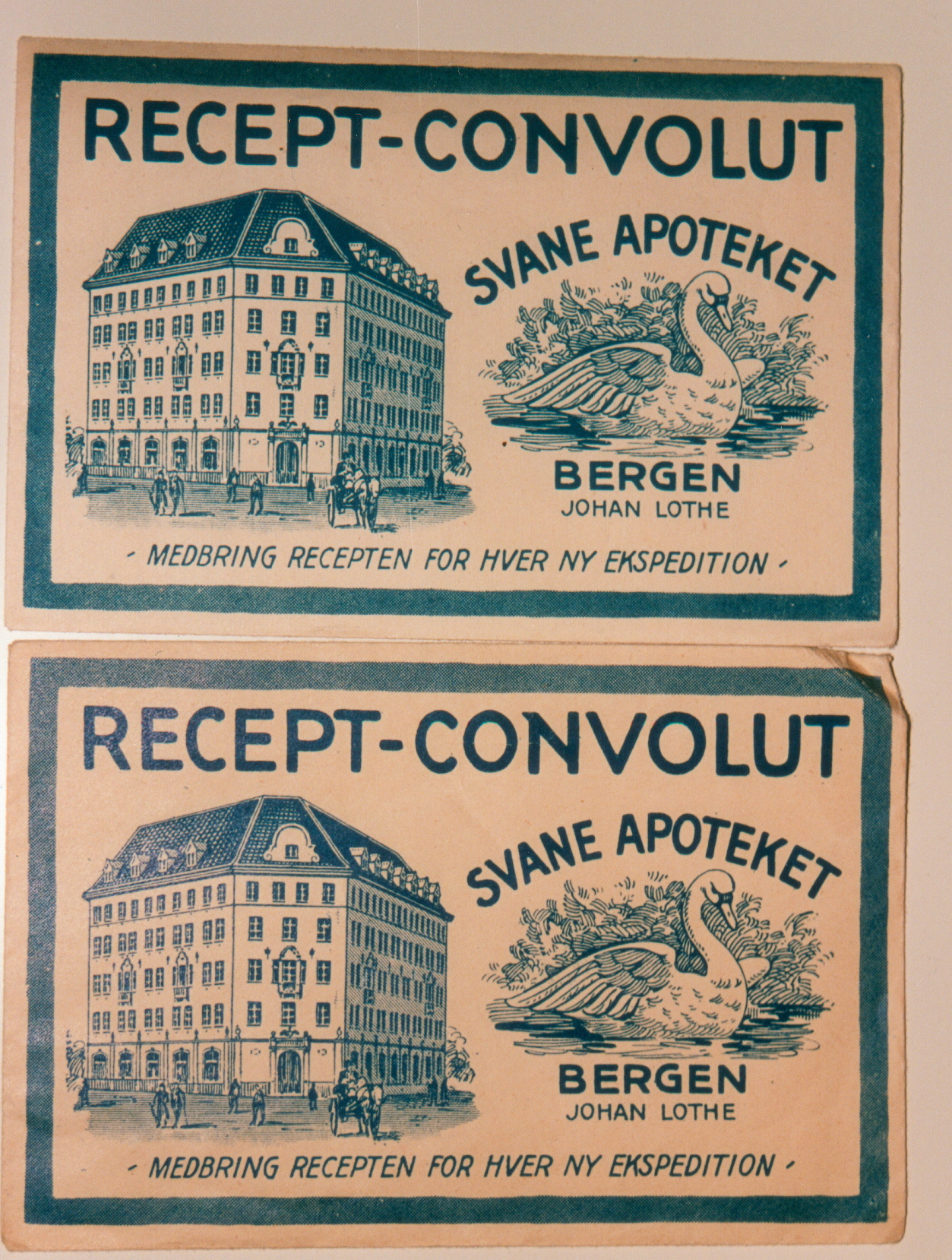
Prescription envelopes

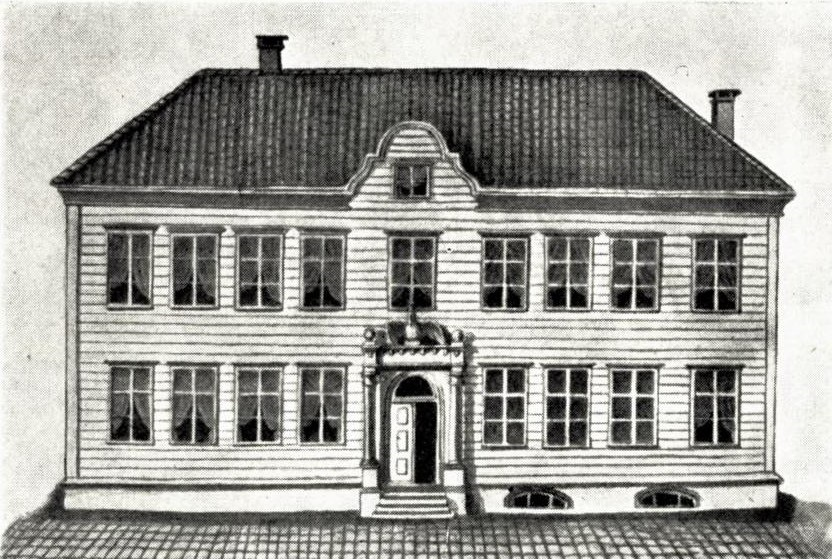
Building in 1848 which was designed by Edvard Bull (brother of Ole Bull)

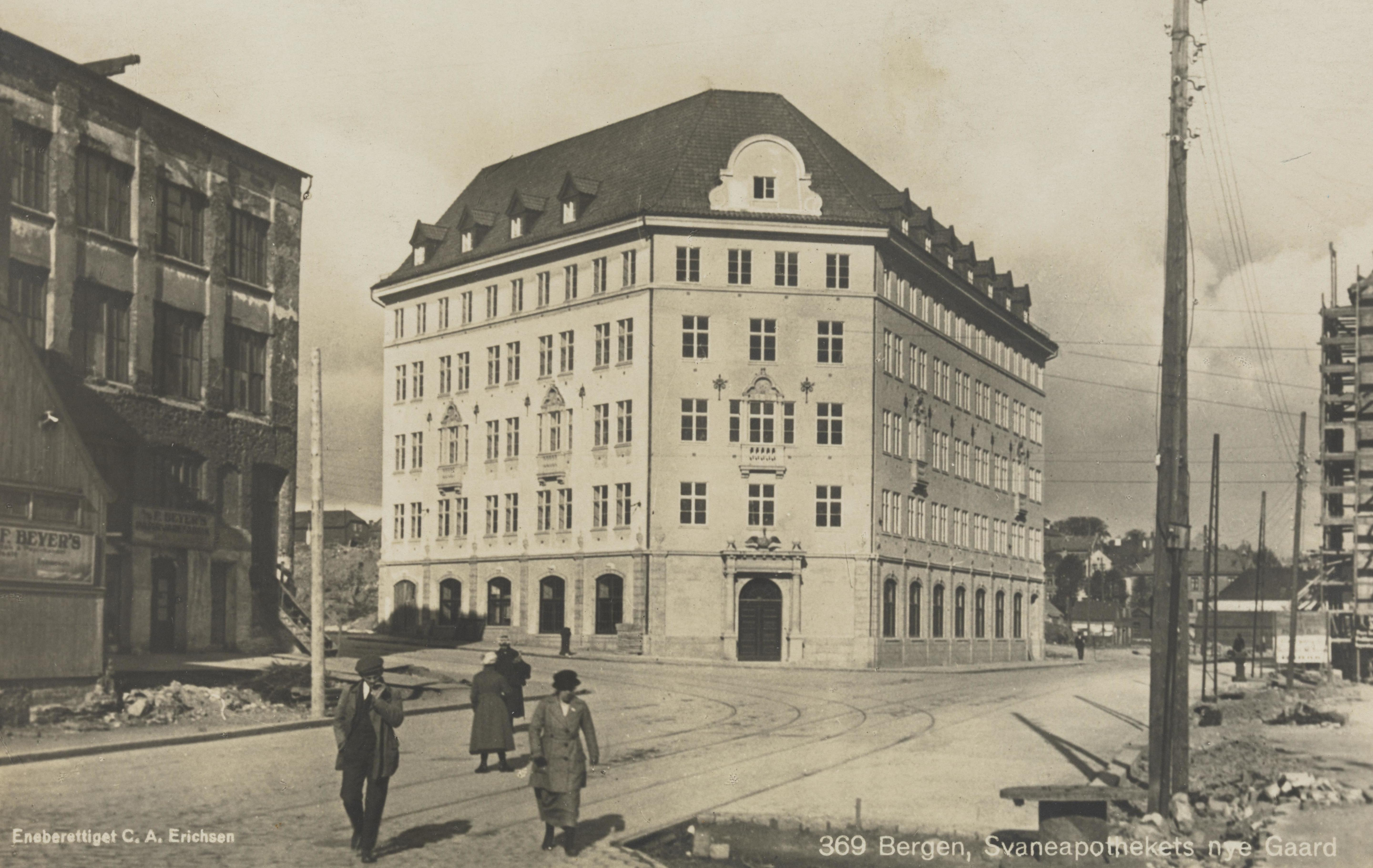
Building after the 1916 fire

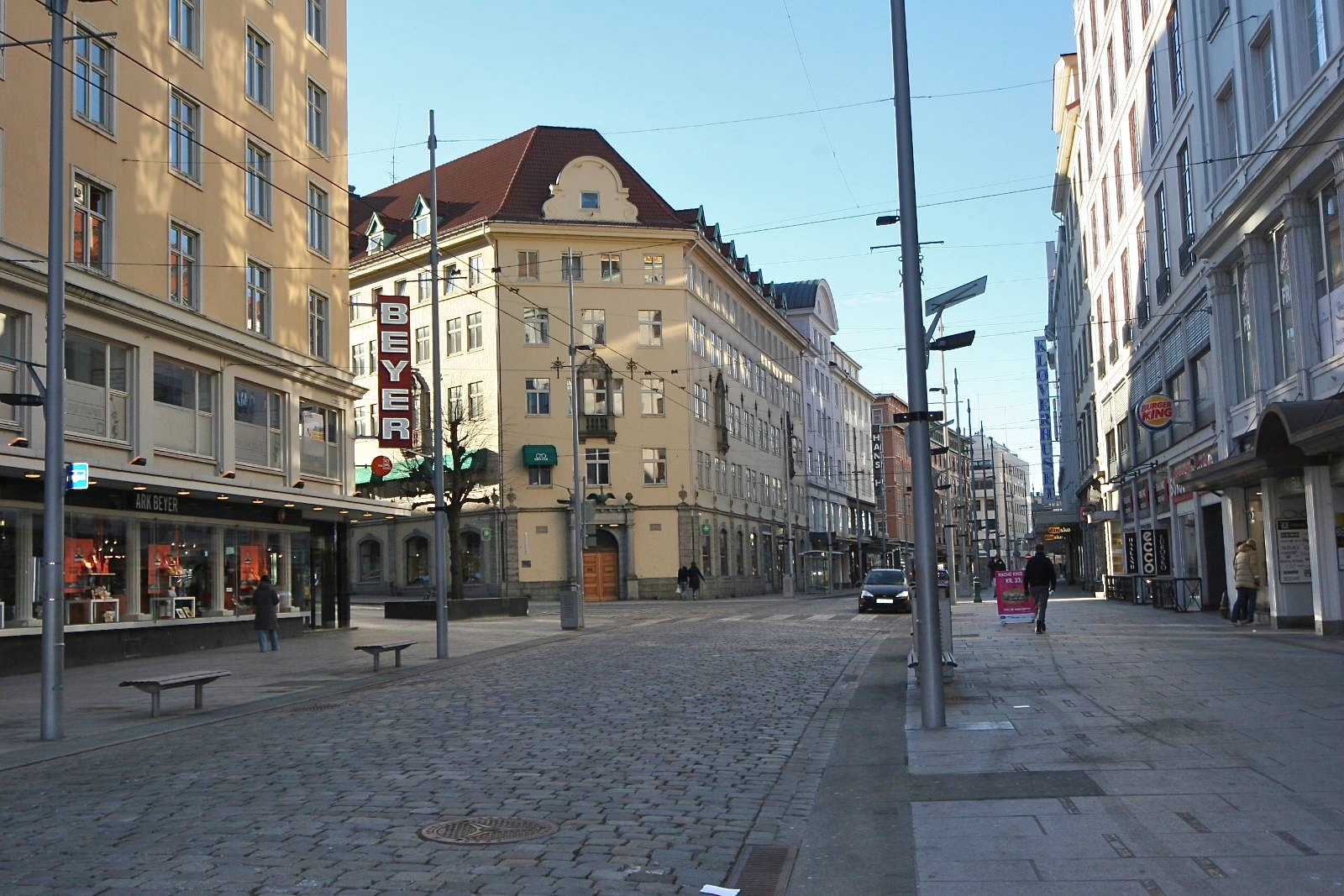
View in the 21st century
