= Fløibanen =

Funicular railway in Bergen, Norway

Coordinates: 60°23′46.90″N 5°19′42.33″E

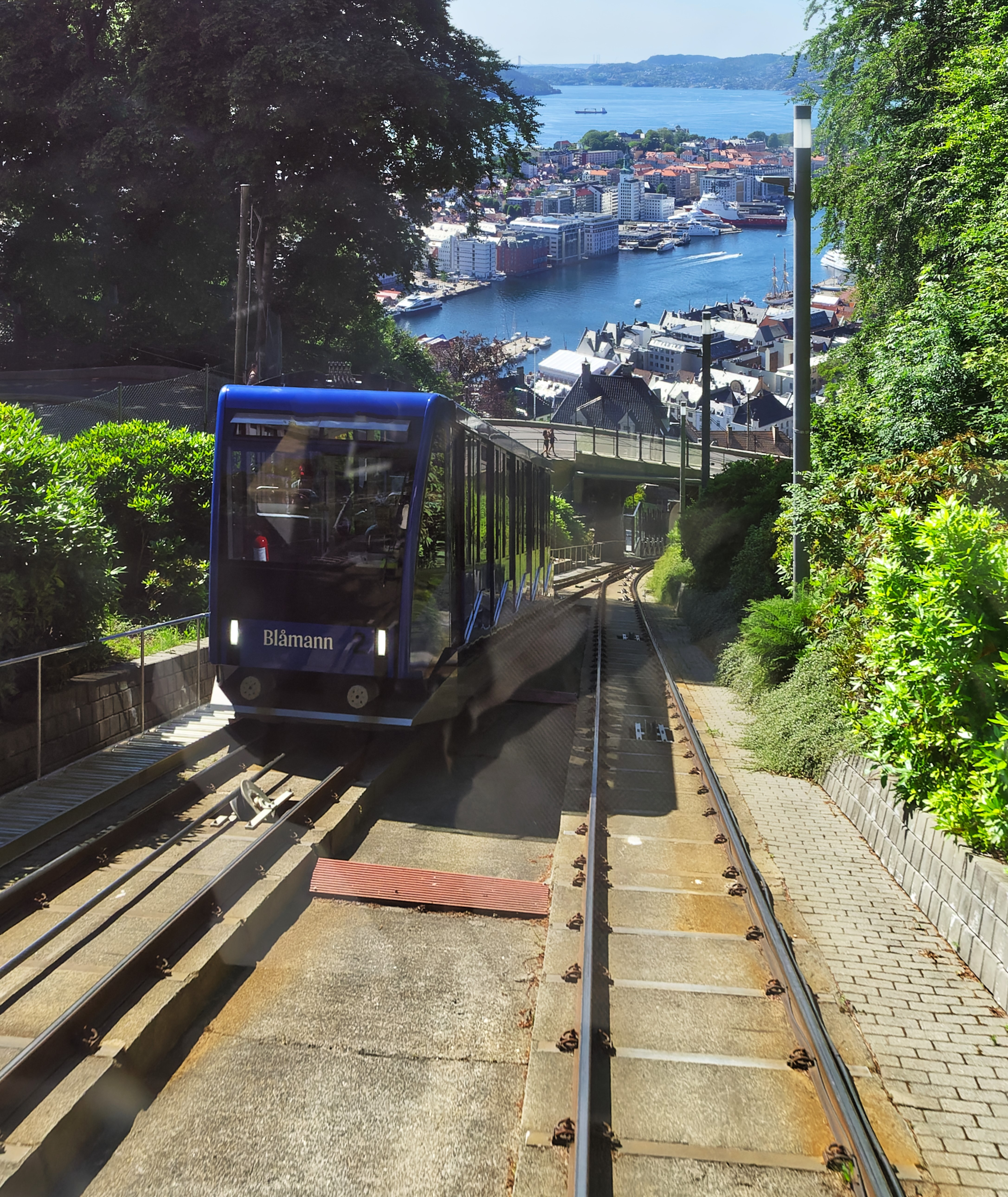
- Fløibanen climbs above the city

Overview
- Status: Open
- Owner: Fløibanen AS
- Termini: Vetrlidsalmenning; Fløien
- Stations: 5

Service
- Type: Funicular
- Operator(s): Fløibanen AS
- Rolling stock: 2 funicular cars

History
- Opened: 15 January 1918

Technical
- Line length: 848 m (2,782 ft)
- Number of tracks: 1 with central passing loop
- Track gauge: 1,000 mm (3 ft 3 3/8 in)
- Operating speed: 7 m/s (22.97 ft/s)
- Highest elevation: 320 m (1,050 ft)

Fløibanen is a funicular railway, owned by Fløibanen AS, in the Norwegian city of Bergen. It connects the city centre with the mountain of Fløyen, with its mountain walks and magnificent views of the city. It is one of Bergen's major tourist attractions and one of Norway's most visited attractions. The line is 848 m (2,782 ft) long, covers a height difference of 302 m (991 ft), and carries nearly two million passengers a year.

== History ==
=== Proposals, design and construction ===
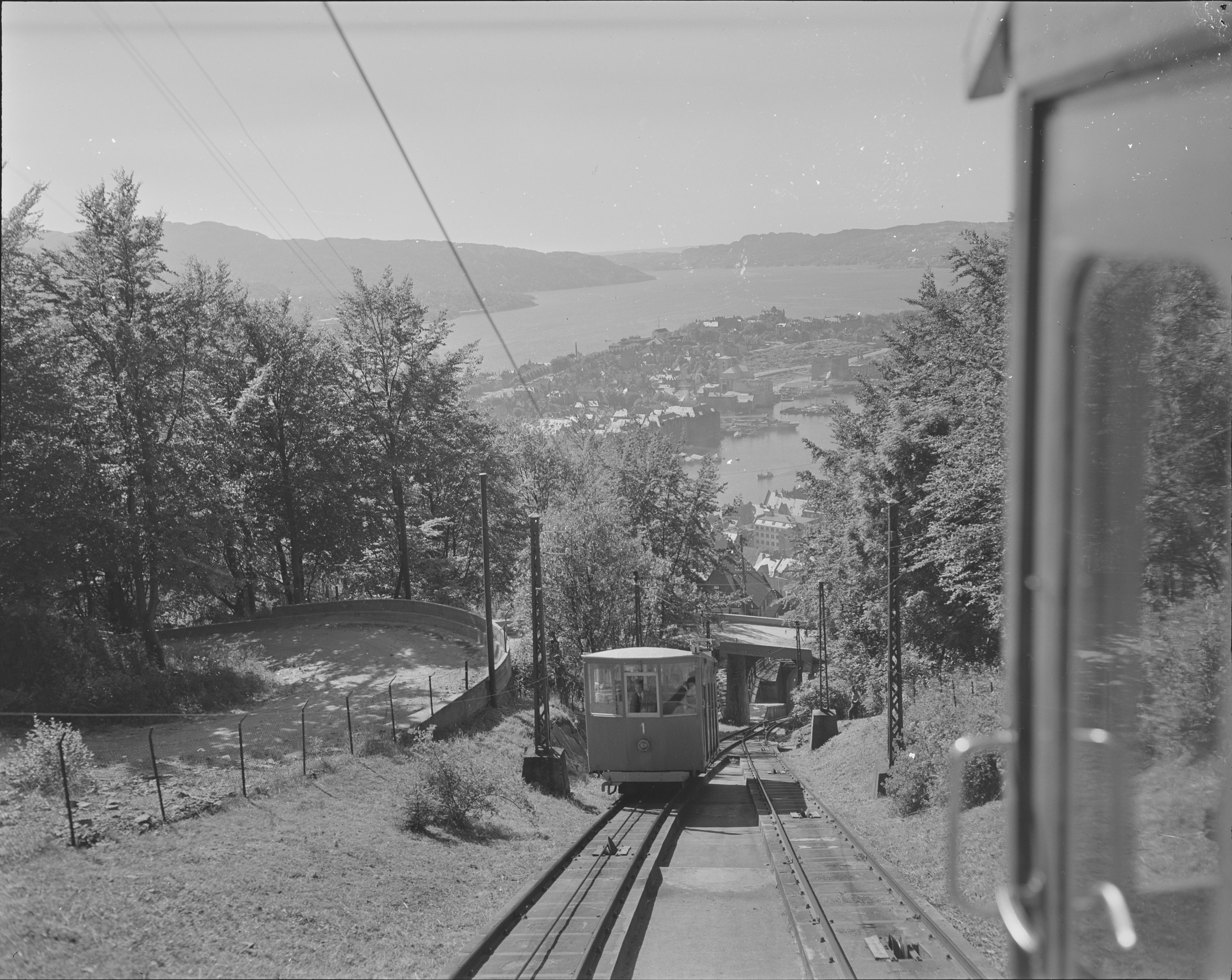
The line between 1948 and 1951

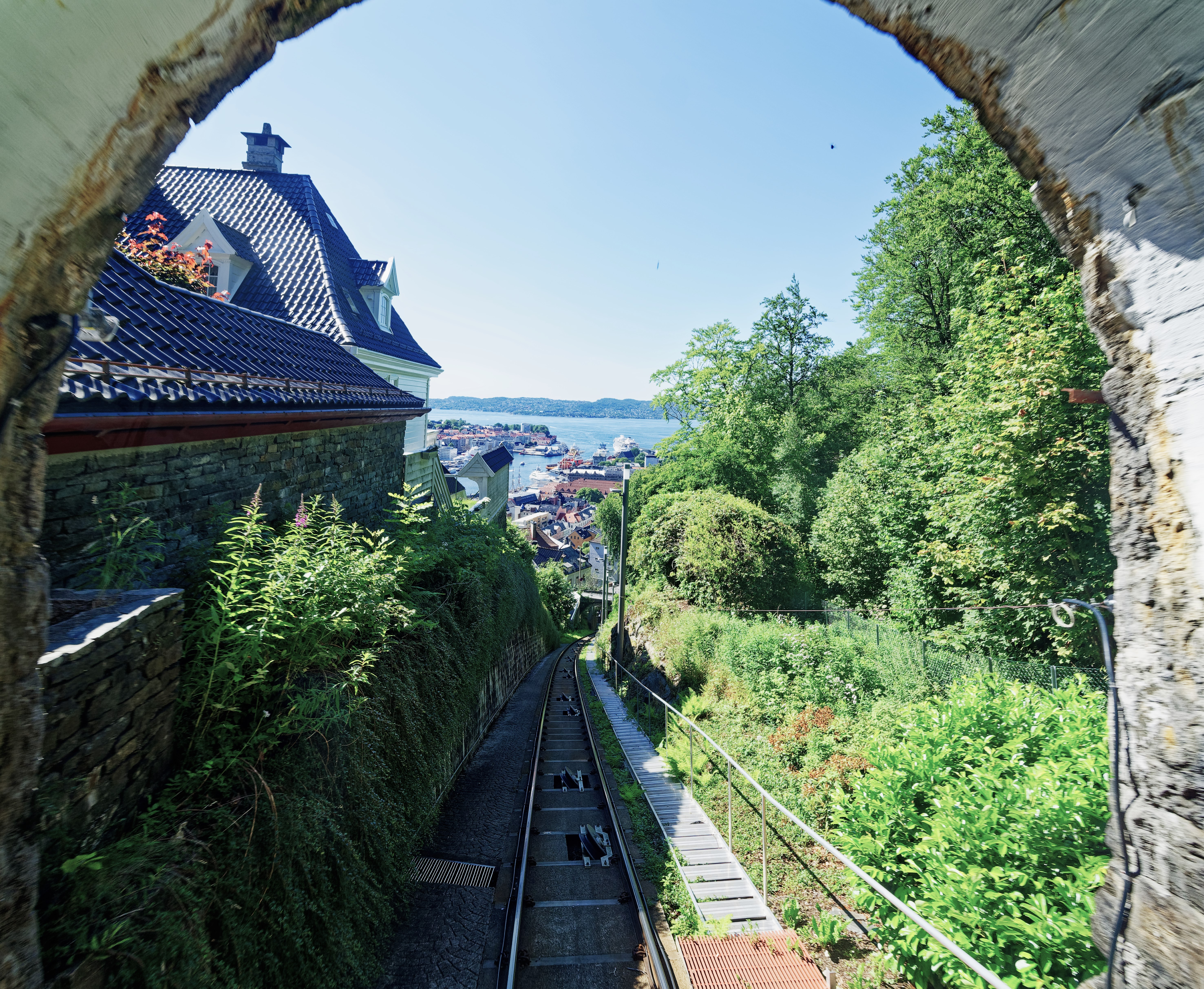
Fløibanen in 2023

Fløyen is a 400 metres (1,300 ft) high mountain near the centre of the Norwegian city of Bergen. The view of the city, its harbour, and the larger Bergen peninsula have long made it a popular attraction. There are also a number of walking trails on the mountain.

The idea to build a funicular was first put forward in 1895 by John Lund, a local resident and member of the Norwegian legislature. Permission was granted by the city council, but the project was shelved after the necessary capital failed to be raised. A further proposal was put forward in 1907 and the company Fløibanen AS was founded to construct and operate the line in 1912. The line was modelled after lines in Germany, Switzerland and Italy, the design being most similar to that of the Merkur funicular in Baden-Baden.

Work on the line started in the autumn of 1914, with a planned construction period of 12 to 18 months. An overhead rail line was used to take spoil from the tunnel at the lower end of the line to barges in the harbour. However, with the cars being built by Maschinenfabrik Esslingen in Germany, and the rails being supplied from Switzerland, shortages caused by the outbreak of World War I delayed the work. The fire of 1916 also contributed to the delays, and the line was not opened until 15 January 1918.

The original cars accommodated 65 passengers, were finished in oiled teak, and were partly open to the elements. A 95 horsepower (71 kW) electric motor hauled the cable at up to 2 metres per second (6.6 ft/s). Each car carried a driver, but an operator at Fløyen controlled the motor, with the drivers communicated to the operator by using a pole to strike a signal wire suspended over the line. The stations were designed by Einar Oscar Schou, who also designed the Folkerestaurant at the summit, opened in 1925.

=== Subsequent history ===
During World War II, the German occupying forces constructed many bunkers and other defensive features on the Fløyen mountain. The funicular was used to transport supplies and personnel, causing wear and tear to the cars and infrastructure. After the occupation ended, the two cars were painted in contrasting colours, with one car in red and the other in blue. These colours, together with the white painted lower station building, represented the Norwegian flag, and have been used ever since.

In 1950, the cable wheels and electric motor were replaced, allowing an increase in speed to 3.3 metres per second (11 ft/s). In 1954 the original cars were replaced with new cars supplied by Von Roll (underframes) and Hønefoss Karosserifabrikk (bodies). These cars accommodated 80 passengers, and the line was operated by drivers on each car, with no need for an operator at Fløyen.

In 1974, the cars on the line were again replaced, with the new cars supplied by Von Roll and also able to carry 80 passengers. In 1987, the electric motor was replaced with a new 190 horsepower (140 kW) one, whilst at the same time the brakes and electrical systems were replaced. In 1997, the lower terminus was refurbished and extended. In 2002, a fourth generation of car was introduced to the line, built by Doppelmayr (underframes) and Gangloff (bodies), capable of carrying 100 passengers, and equipped with larger windows and glass roofs.

In 2022, the line was upgraded to provide better barrier-free access and higher capacity. The line was extended by 5 metres (16 ft) at its upper end to allow step-free access between the car and the viewing platform. New cars were provided with a capacity of 120 passengers, and the maximum speed was increased from 6 metres per second (20 ft/s) to 7 metres per second (23 ft/s). The new cars carry the traditional blue and red colours and names, and like their predecessors have large windows and glass roofs. The upgrade was undertaken by Garaventa, with the cars being built by CWA Constructions.

== Operation ==
=== Technical ===
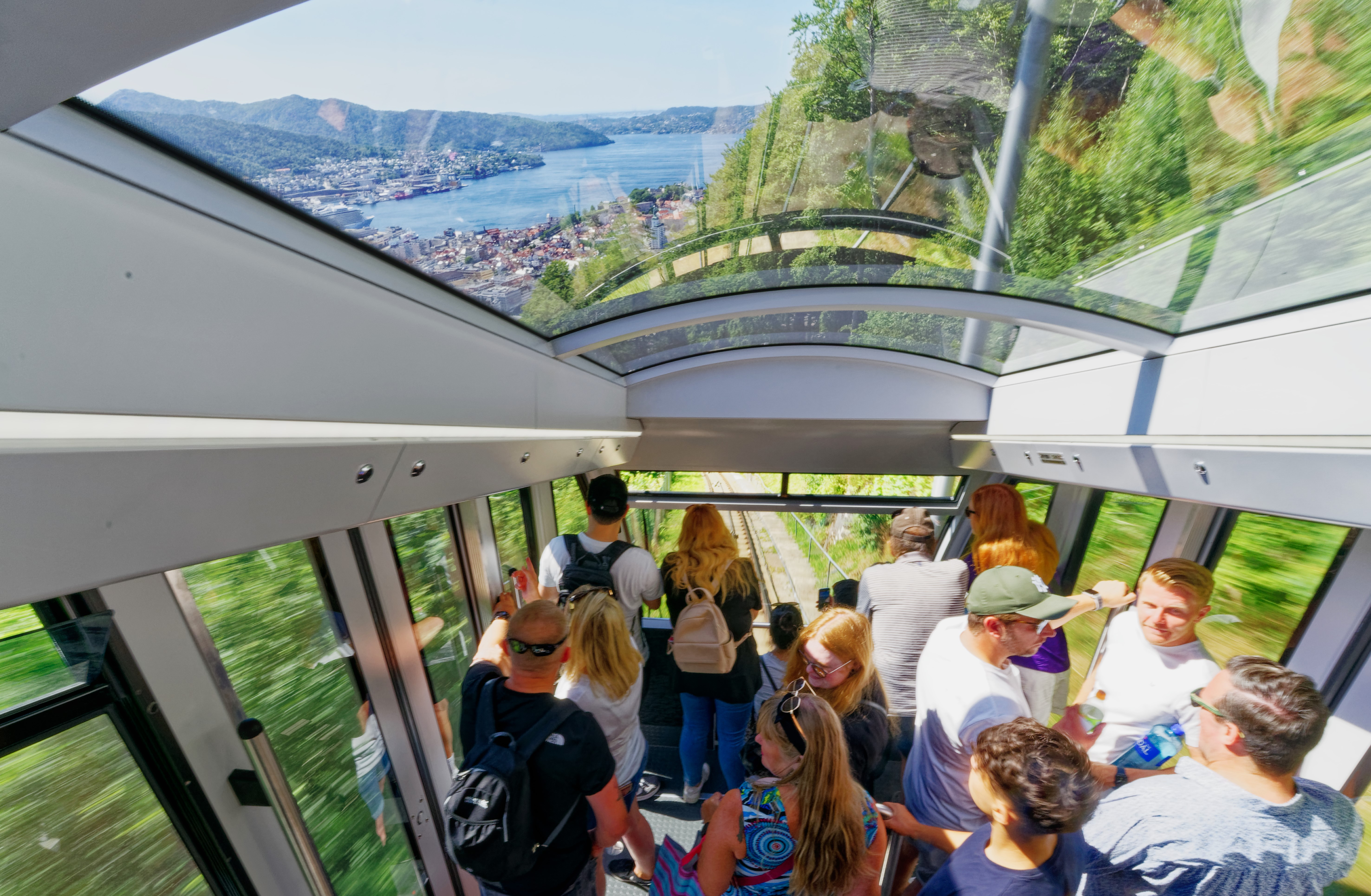
View from the inside

Fløibanen has an overall length of 848 m (2,782 ft) with a height difference between the two terminal stations of 302 m (991 ft). The line is single track with a central passing loop. The lower terminal and first 150 m (492 ft) of the line is in tunnel, and there is a short tunnel above the passing loop, but the rest of the line is in the open air. The track is of 1,000 mm (3 ft 3 3/8 in) gauge and the gradient varies between 15 and 26 degrees.

There are two cars, each of which can carry 120 passengers. The cars have a stepped floor, large windows and a glass roof, in order to maximise visibility of the view whilst in transit. The cars are individually named and painted, with Blåmann in blue and Rødhette (Little Red Riding Hood) in red. Each car is operated by a driver, who occupies a cabin at the uphill end of the car irrespective of direction of travel.

The drivers remotely control the speed of the cable, which is powered by a 355 kW (476 hp) electric motor and slowed by redundant braking systems, all located at the upper terminus. In normal service the cars operate at 4 m/s (13 ft/s), but at times of high demand this can be increased to 7 m/s (23 ft/s). The cable itself is 960 m (3,150 ft) long, has a diameter of 45 mm (1.8 in), and has a breaking load of 66.5 tonnes. In the unlikely event of the cable breaking, the loss of cable tension would automatically cause track gripper brakes on each car to be deployed to bring them to a standstill.

=== Commercial ===
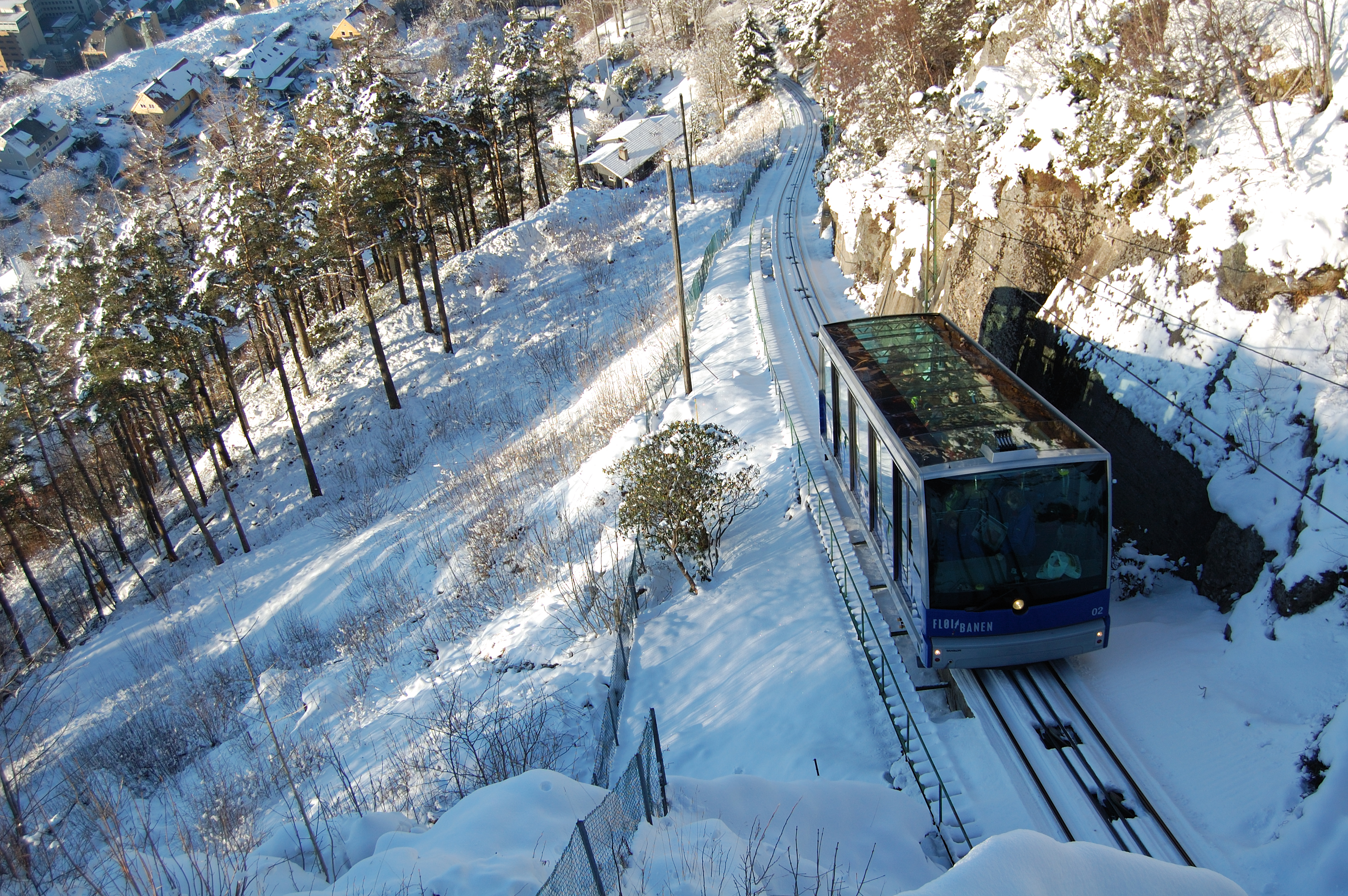
The line in winter

The line is owned and operated by Fløibanen AS. As of 2023, the company had some 100 employees, of whom 36 were full time, and 473 shareholders. The largest shareholders were the City of Bergen (47.6%) and GC Rieber (13.67%). The company's office is located at Fløyen.

The line runs every day from early morning to late evening. In the early morning and late evening, departures are half-hourly, increasing to quarter-hourly during the day and more frequently at times of high demand. Some journeys run non-stop. Depending on speed and stops, the journey can take from 3 min to 8 minutes, and at its maximum capacity the line can carry 1,530 passengers per hour.

The line has a staffed ticket office at its lower terminus, and self-service ticket machines at all stops. Tickets can also be bought online, and either printed or presented on a mobile device screen. Ticket barriers are in place at all stations, and tickets must be optically scanned to gain access to the platforms.

=== Accessibility ===
The stepped floor of each car matches up with the line's stepped platforms, with doors on each side at each level. Wheelchairs and strollers/buggies are carried on the level of the car accessed through the uppermost door, and can board and exit at the terminal stations only. The facilities at the summit are also accessible, and a selection of the mountain trails are usable.

== Route ==
The following points are served:

Name	Description	Image
Sentrum or Vetrlidsallmenningen	The lower terminus, which is situated on Vetrlidsallmenningen, two minutes walk from Bryggen and the Vågen harbour in the city centre, at an elevation of 18 m (59 ft) above mean sea level. The station building was designed by the architect Einar Oscar Schou. The terminal platforms are in tunnel and connected to the street level station building by an underground corridor. From here, the line runs in roughly hewn tunnel as far as Promsgate.	
Promsgate	An intermediate stop, which is situated on Proms gate, one minutes walk from the old Skansen fire station, at an elevation of 59 m (194 ft) above mean sea level. The stop is in the open, just above the exit from the tunnel from the lower terminus. Above this point, the line runs in the open air, with the exception of a short tunnel at the upper end of the passing loop.	
Fjellveien	An intermediate stop, which is situated on Fjellveien, at an elevation of 114 m (374 ft) above mean sea level, which gives access to scenic walks to the north and south of town. The stop is located just below the passing loop. When one car is halted here, the other car is stopped at Skansemyren.	
	Passing loop. Cars do not stop.	
Skansemyren	An intermediate stop, which is situated in Skansemyren, at an elevation of 181 m (594 ft) above mean sea level, which is five minutes walk from sports arena. The stop is located just above the passing loop, partly in the open air and partly in the short tunnel that separates it from the loop. When one car is halted here, the other car is stopped at Fjellveien.	
	Unnamed stopping point without platforms or passenger access. One car halts here when the other car stops at Promsgate.	
Fløyen or Fløyfjellet	Upper terminus, at an elevation of 320 m (1,050 ft) above mean sea level. The stop gives access to viewing terraces, the Folkerestaurant restaurant and cafe, and to the walking trails on the mountain of Fløyen.	

== Gallery ==
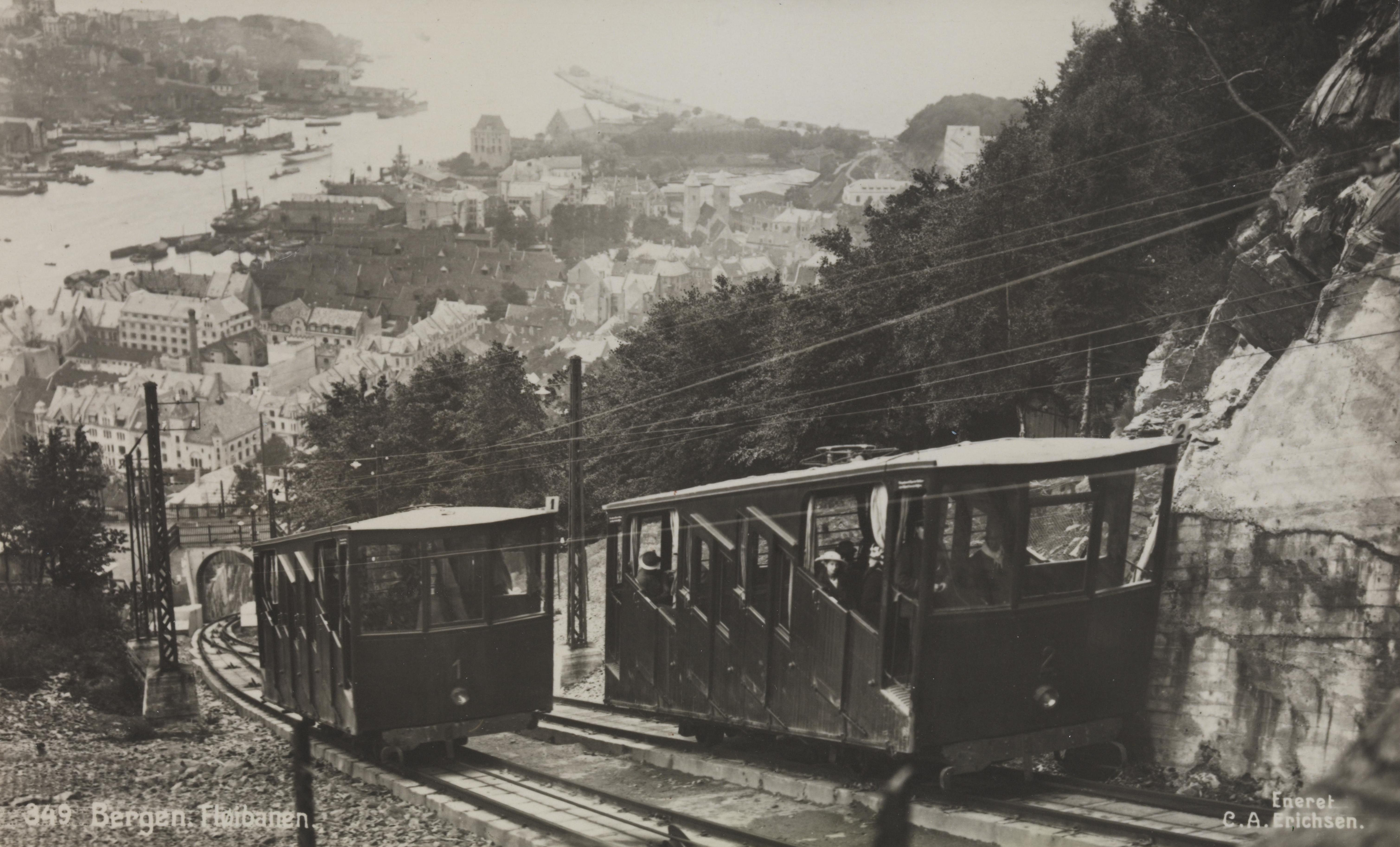
First generation cars at the passing loop in the early years of the line

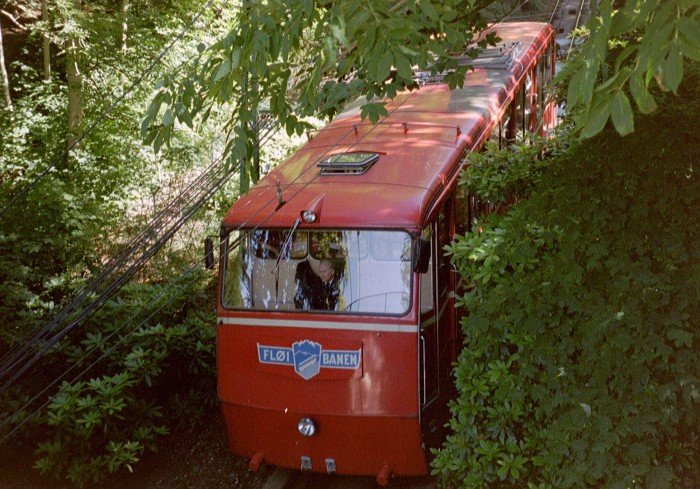
Third generation Rødhette car in 1999

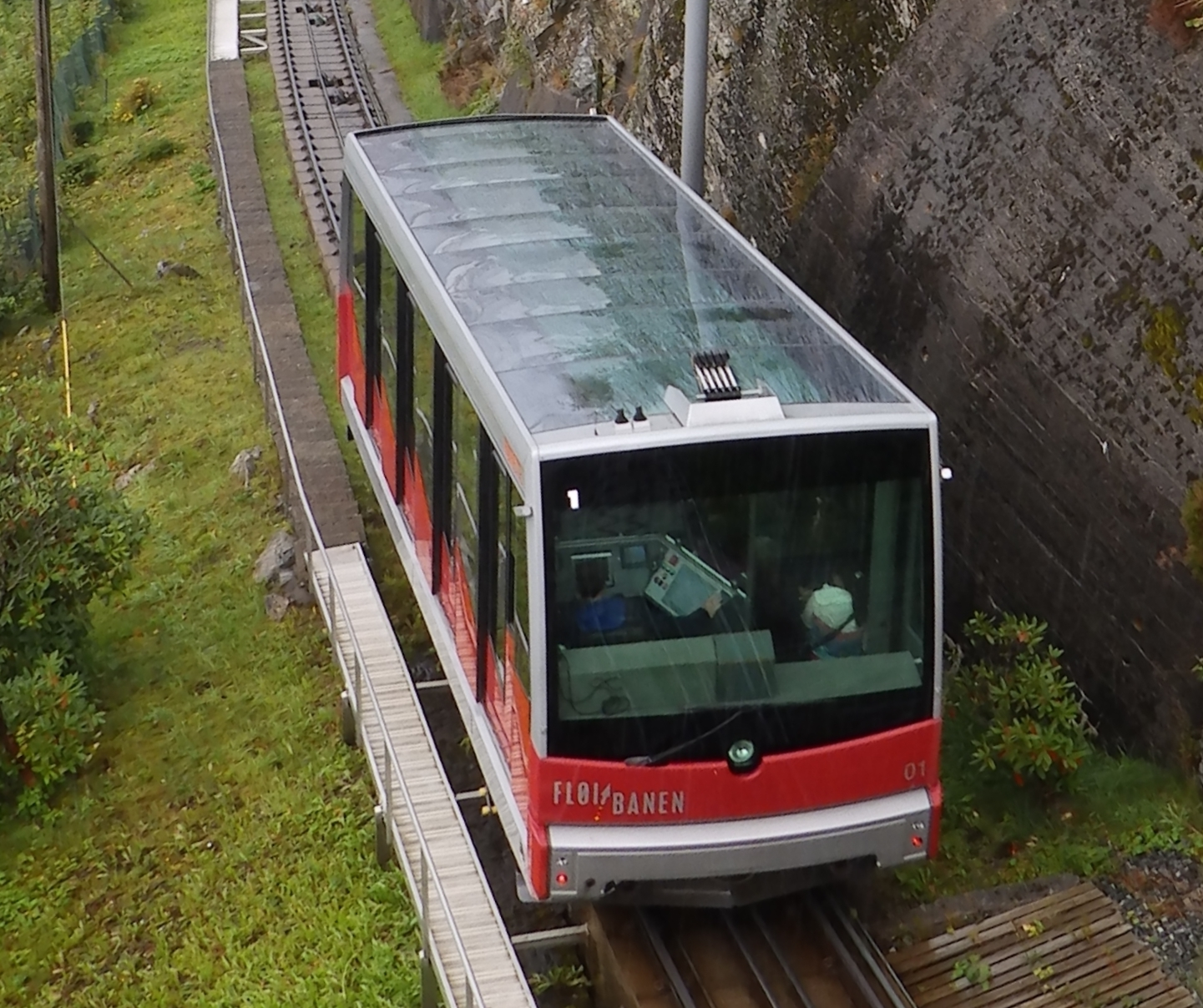
Fourth generation car near the summit in 2014

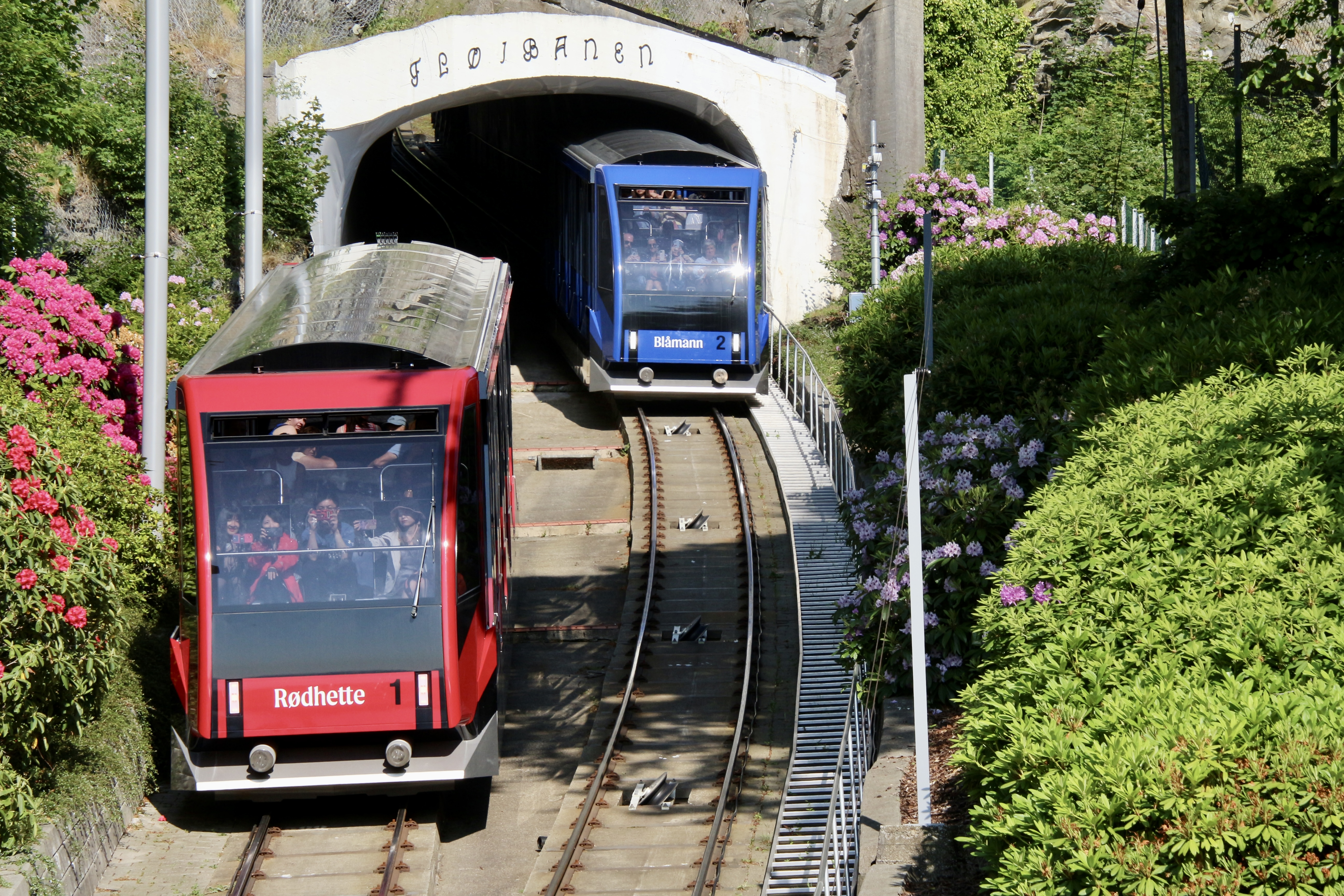
Fifth generation cars at the passing loop in 2023

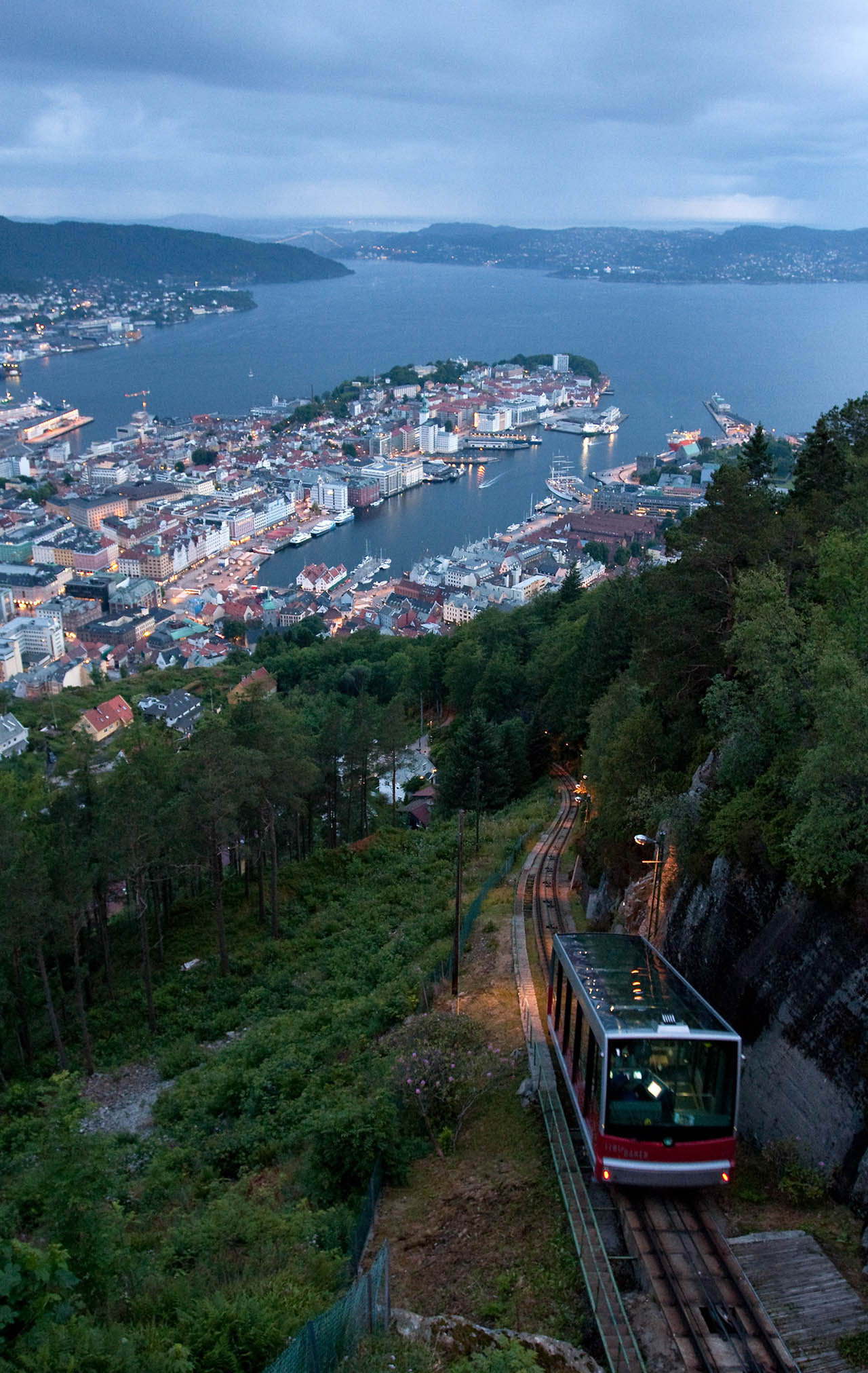
The funicular by night

Video of a descent

== See also ==
- List of funicular railways
- Rail transport in Norway
