= Lorentz Diderich Klüwer =

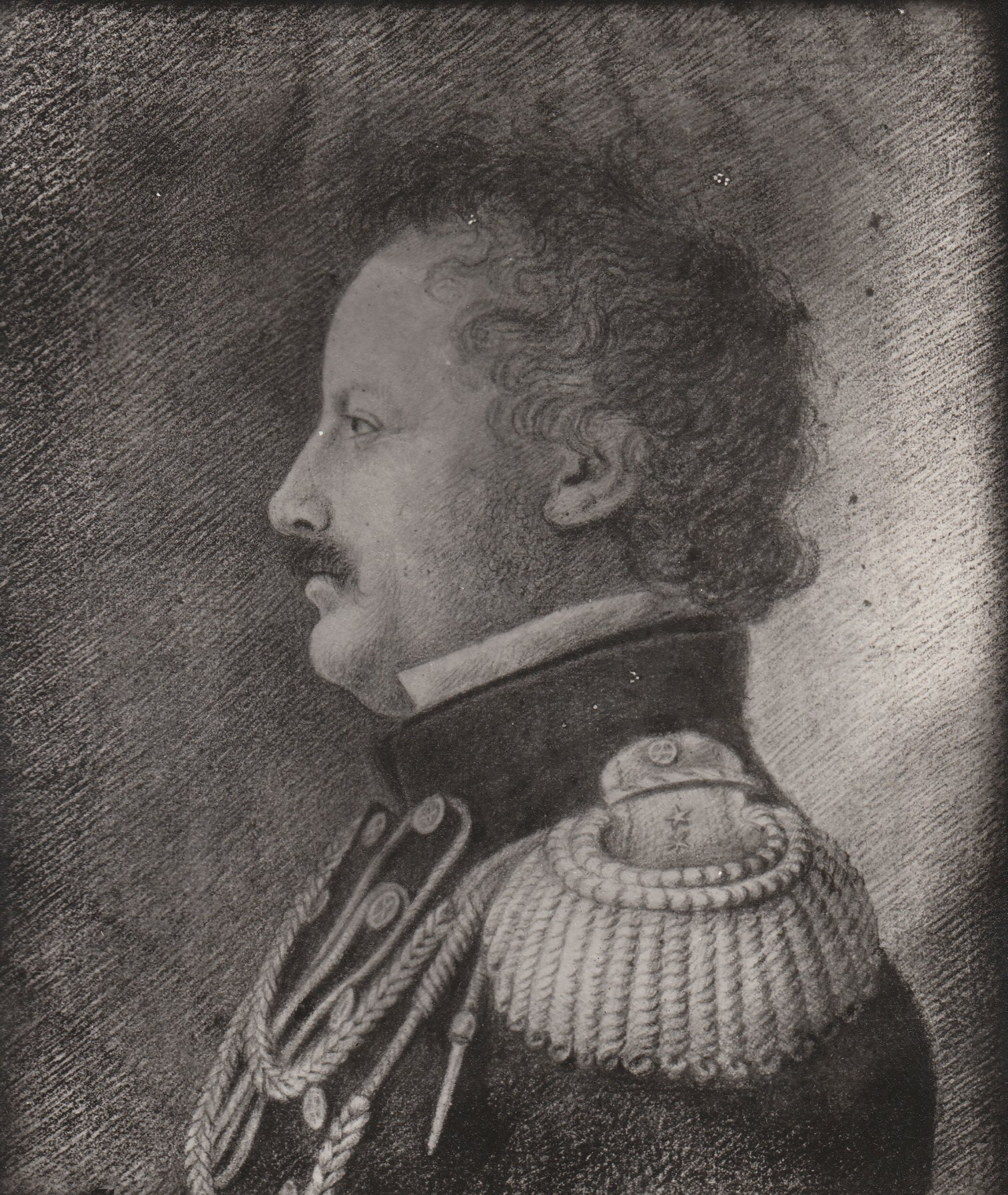
- Lorentz Diderik Klüwer
- Born: 23 December 1790; Verdal Municipality, Nord-Trøndelag, Norway
- Died: 4 January 1825 (aged 34)
- Occupations: Officer, cartographer, antiquarian
- Notable work: Kart over Norges militaire Inddeling, Norske Mindesmerker

Lorentz Diderich Klüwer (23 December 1790 – 4 January 1825) was a Norwegian officer, cartographer and antiquarian.

Klüwer was born at Verdal Municipality in Nord-Trøndelag, Norway. He was the son of Wilhelm Klüwer (1759–1816) and Sophie Hersleb Krog (1771–1848). From 1804–08, he attended the Norwegian Military Academy in Christiania (now Oslo). Klüwer entered the Royal Norwegian Army becoming a Captain in 1815 and Major in 1823. From 1811, Klüwer was a member of the Royal Norwegian Society of Sciences and Letters.

From 1810 until 1814, he worked to make military maps of northern Norway from Femunden to Snåsa Municipality. His work included surveys, historical maps and a registry of cultural monuments. His Kart over Norges militaire Inddeling was published in 1821. Klüwer's main work, Norske Mindesmerker, was published in 1823.
