= Buekorps Museum =

Museum in Norway

Coordinates: 60.3948°N 5.3199°E

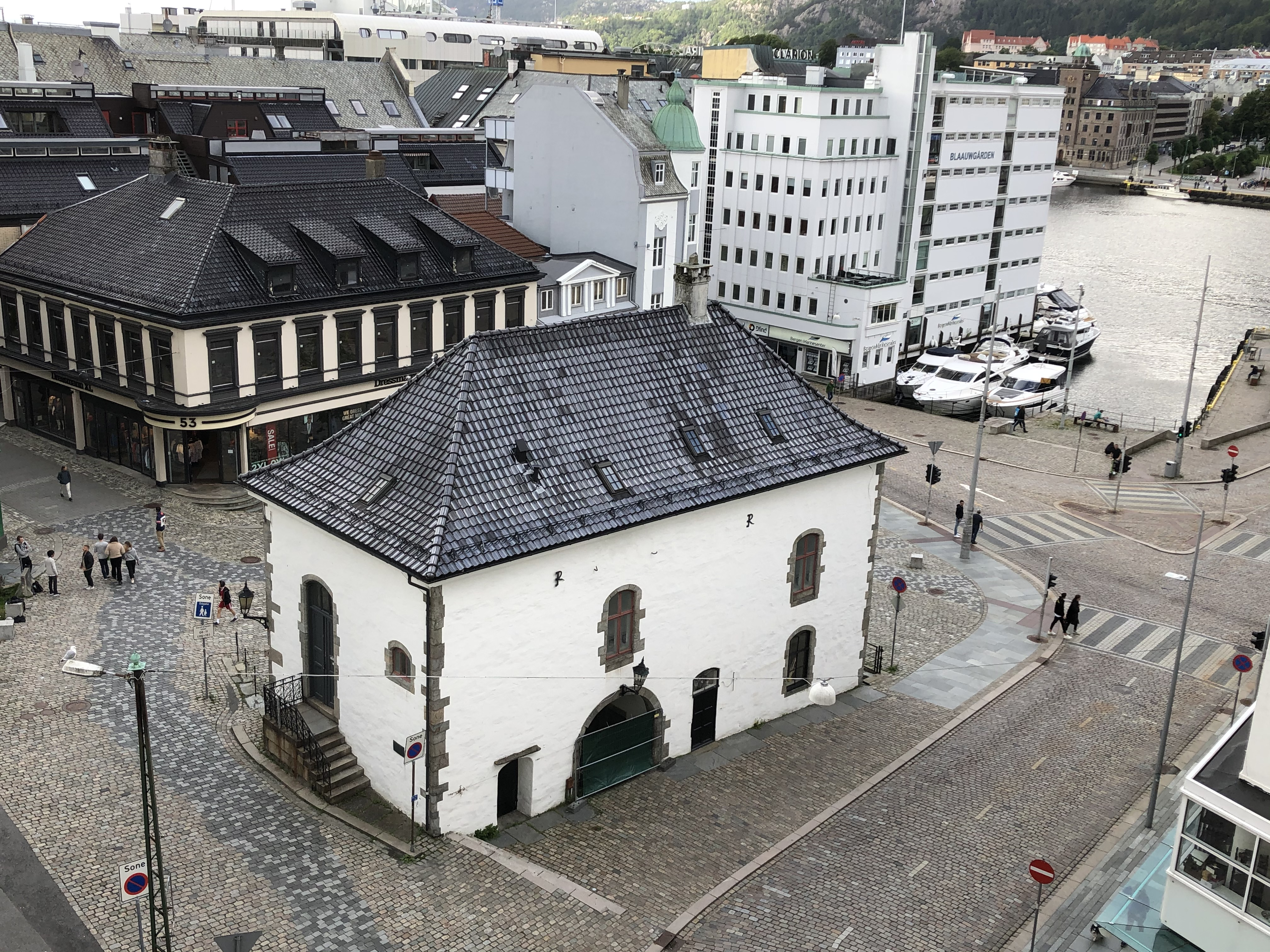
Buekorps Museum is located in Murhvelvingen on Østre Muralmenning

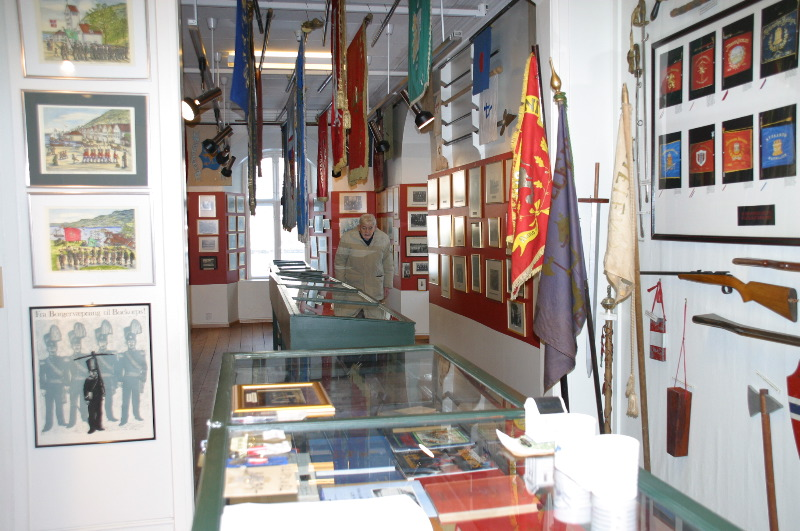
Inside the Buekorps Museum

The Buekorps Museum (Buekorpsmuseet) is a museum in Bergen, Norway. It is dedicated to the traditional neighborhood youth marching organization, Buekorps.

The Buekorps Museum was established in 1977 and is located in Murhvelvingen on Østre Muralmenning. Murhvelvingen was constructed as a private residence after a great fire disaster in Bergen in 1561. Construction was directed by nobleman Erik Ottesen Rosenkrantz til Arreskov (1519-1575), who was commander Bergenhus from 1560 to 1568. The building was damaged by fires in 1625, 1640, and 1643 and was repaired in 1651–52. The current pavilion was built after the Bergen fire of 1702.
