= Bergen fire of 1916 =

Conflagration in Bergen, Norway

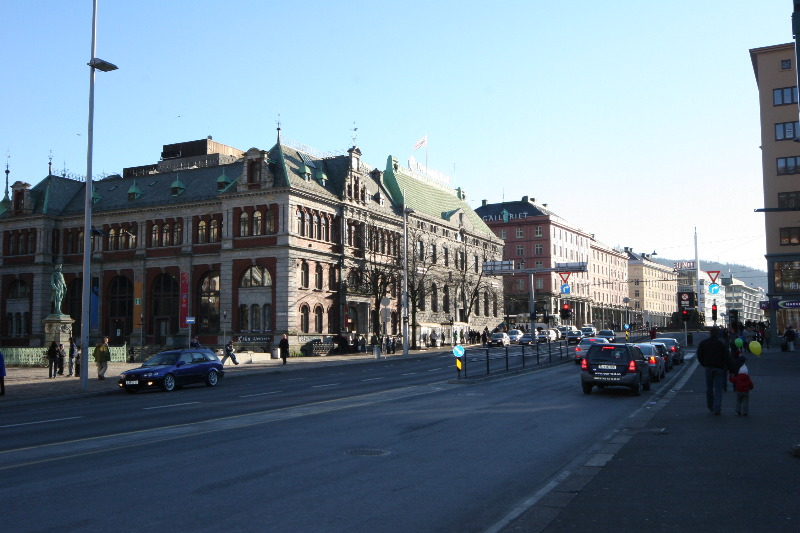
The Stock Exchange Building and Bank Building are examples of architecture from before the 1916 Bergen fire.

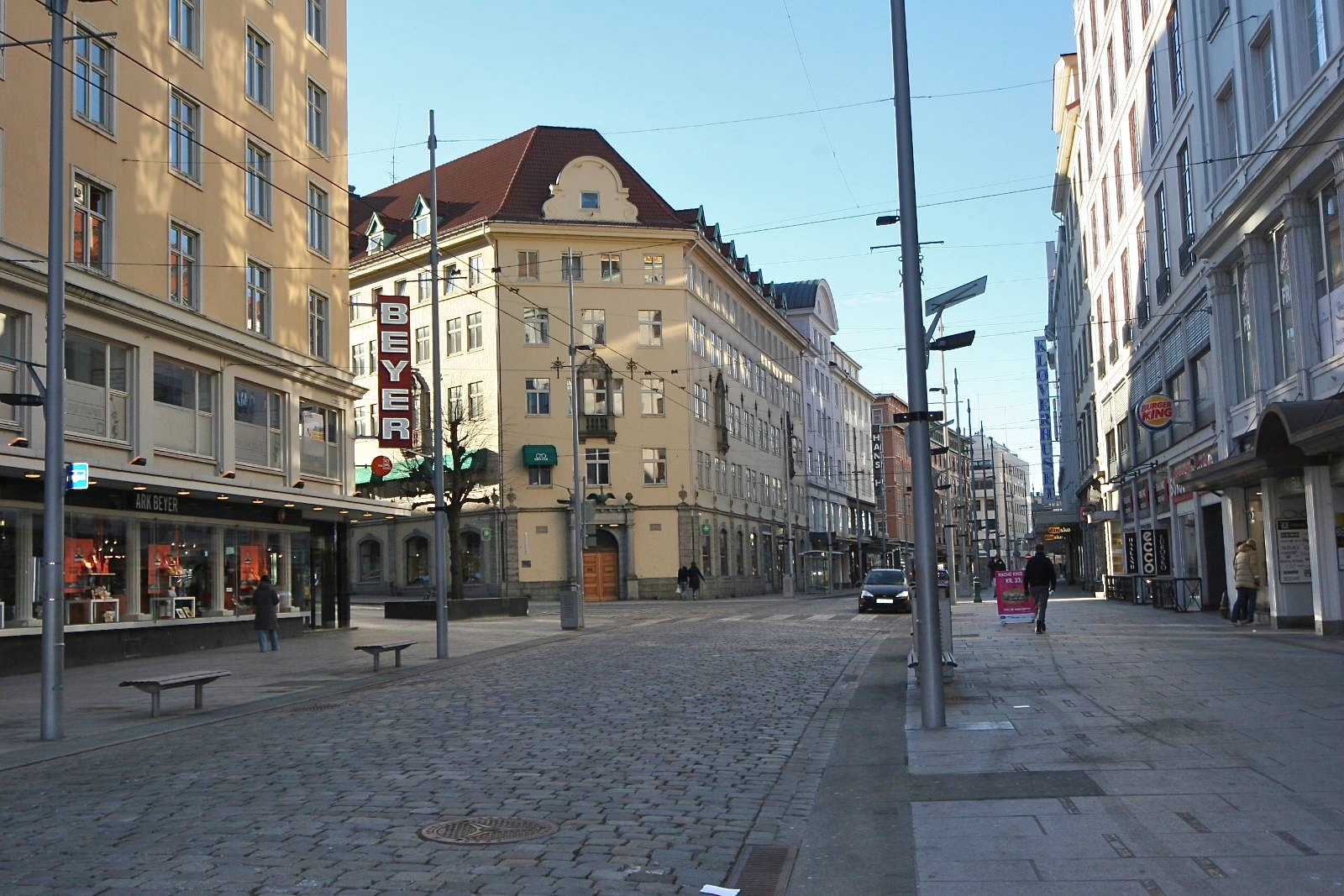
The buildings along Strandgaten (Beach Street) were erected after the Bergen fire in 1916. It was then possible to rebuild Bergen's center.

The Bergen fire of 1916 was an urban fire that took place on January 15 and 16, 1916 and burned many of the buildings in Bergen, Norway. Except for the buildings on Rådstuplassen (City Hall Square), all of the buildings in Bergen's center district were destroyed in the fire.

== Chronology and damage ==
At five pm on Saturday, January 15, 1916, some workers were taking inventory of stock for the Berstad scrap-iron dealer in a shed at Murallmenningen (Mur Commons). There was a strong storm outside with hurricane-force gusts. One of the workers accidentally ignited a ball of black oakum with a light. He opened the door to throw it into the sea. There was a gust of wind, and soon the entire shed was burning.

The wind quickly spread the fire inward along Strandgaten towards Torget (Market Square), and the warehouses burned like tinder. The fire also burned upward along Markeveien towards the Engen district. It was soon realized that Strandgaten could not be saved, and so efforts were made to stop the fire at Torgallmenningen (Market Commons). Spraying focused on keeping the Stock Exchange Building and Bank Building wet; this managed to rescue them and to prevent the fire from spreading to the Vågsbunnen district. The situation was worse to the west. The firemen were unable to stop the fire before it reached the fire station. To the south, the fire was stopped at the art museum largely due to assistance from the military, which kept the building wet all night using tarpaulins. They were also able to save the east side of Ole Bulls plass (Ole Bull Square). The Hotell Norge caught fire, but was saved from burning down. The National Theater was also saved through the efforts of the actors.

The fire destroyed the entire area between Torgallminningen and Murallmenningen. The area between Torgallminningen and the fire station, which was built after the 1855 city fire, was also destroyed. In one night the city center, with buildings going back to the Middle Ages, was reduced to ashes. Altogether, 380 buildings were burned and 2,700 people were left homeless. The losses suffered during the 10 hours of the fire included 612 apartments, 388 shops, 242 workshops, 42 factories, 219 offices, and 288 storage rooms; the fire also affected three newspaper companies, four hotels, six insurance companies, and two schools, and it resulted in the loss of 1,000 jobs.

The destroyed area was fenced off, and then ruins that posed a threat were dynamited. Still standing were 17 buildings or parts of buildings, including the new Telephone Company building on Veiten, which stands there to this day. Then roads were cleared to provide connections to the Nordnes and Engen neighborhoods. To provide housing for many of those left homeless after the fire, the municipality built a shanty town in the Gyldenpris area. The shantytown was nicknamed Blodbyen (Blood Town) because of the crimson color of the buildings and the later violence there.
