= Einar Oscar Schou =

Norwegian architect

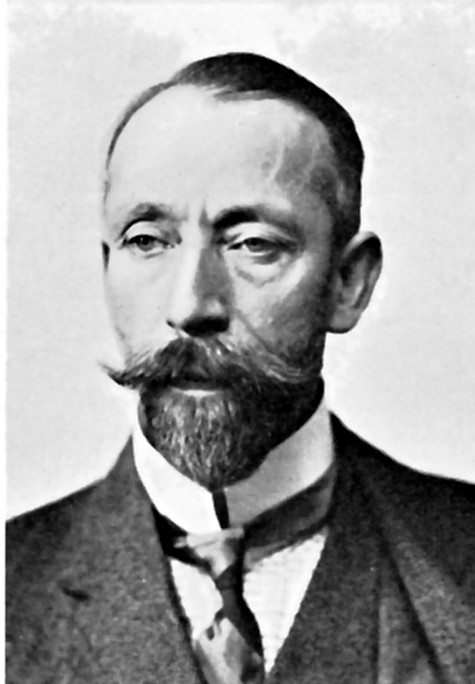
Einar Oscar Schou

Einar Oscar Schou (4 June 1877 – 28 December 1966) was a Norwegian architect. He is most noted for his design of Den Nationale Scene in Bergen, Norway.

== Background ==
Einar Oscar Schou was born in Kristiania, Norway. He studied at the Royal Drawing School from 1898 to 1901. He was assistant to the architect Halfdan Berle in Oslo from 1899 to 1901. He studied at the Art Academy in Stockholm between 1901 and 1903. After graduation, he became head of the Agi Lindgren architectural firm in Stockholm and was there for three years. In 1907, he founded his own architectural practice and ran this until after World War II. From 1935 to 1951, he was director of the Bergen Arts School (Bergens kunsthåndverksskole), now part of the Bergen National Academy of the Arts.

== Career ==
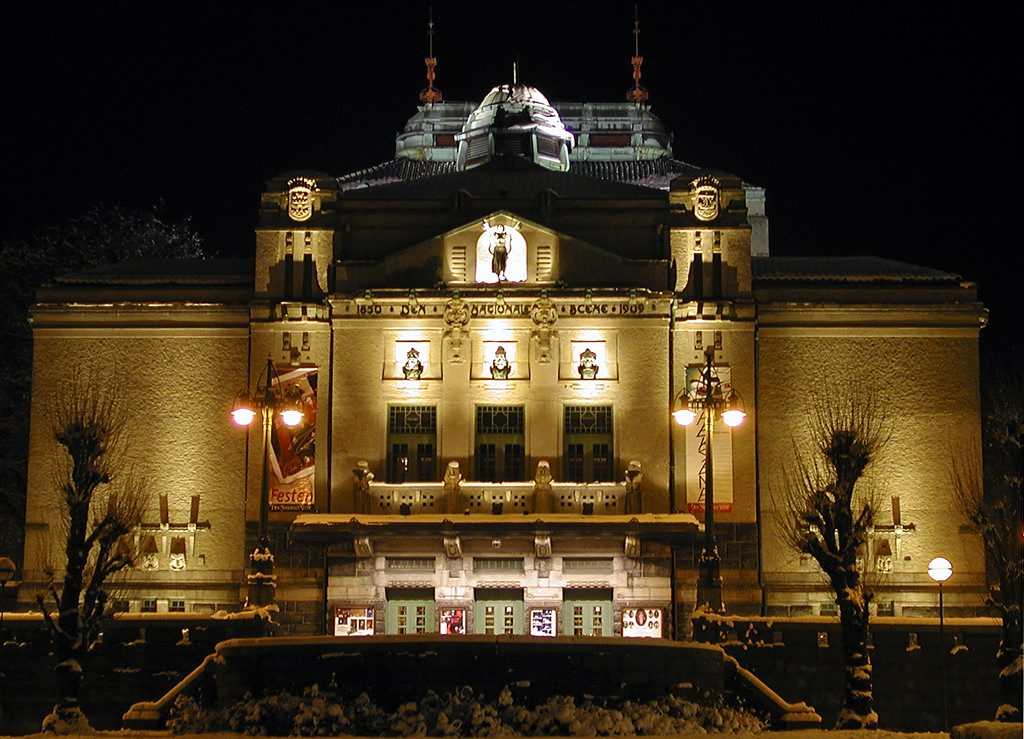
Den Nationale Scene

His best-known work is the design of the theatre Den Nationale Scene at Engen in Bergen. In 1904, he won the competition for the theater building, where his proposal was preferred over veteran Bergen-based architect, Henrik Bull. The theater building designed by Schou opened on 19 February 1909, with King Haakon VII of Norway and Queen Maud in attendance. The hall, foyer and lobby were largely destroyed during World War II. In 2001 the building was brought back almost to its original shape.

Schou was also responsible for the design of the Fløien Folkerestaurant at the summit of the Fløyen mountain that overlooks Bergen, and the stations buildings of the Fløibanen funicular railway that climbs that mountain. The railway was completed in 1918, and was followed by the restaurant in 1925.

Schou was Chairman of the Bergen Art Society 1914–15. He served on the Bergen city council for the Norwegian Conservative Party from 1929 to 1937 and was a member of a number of Bergen municipal councils and committees. Schou was decorated Knight, First Class of the Royal Norwegian Order of St. Olav in 1909. Schou earned the Houen Foundation Award in 1912.

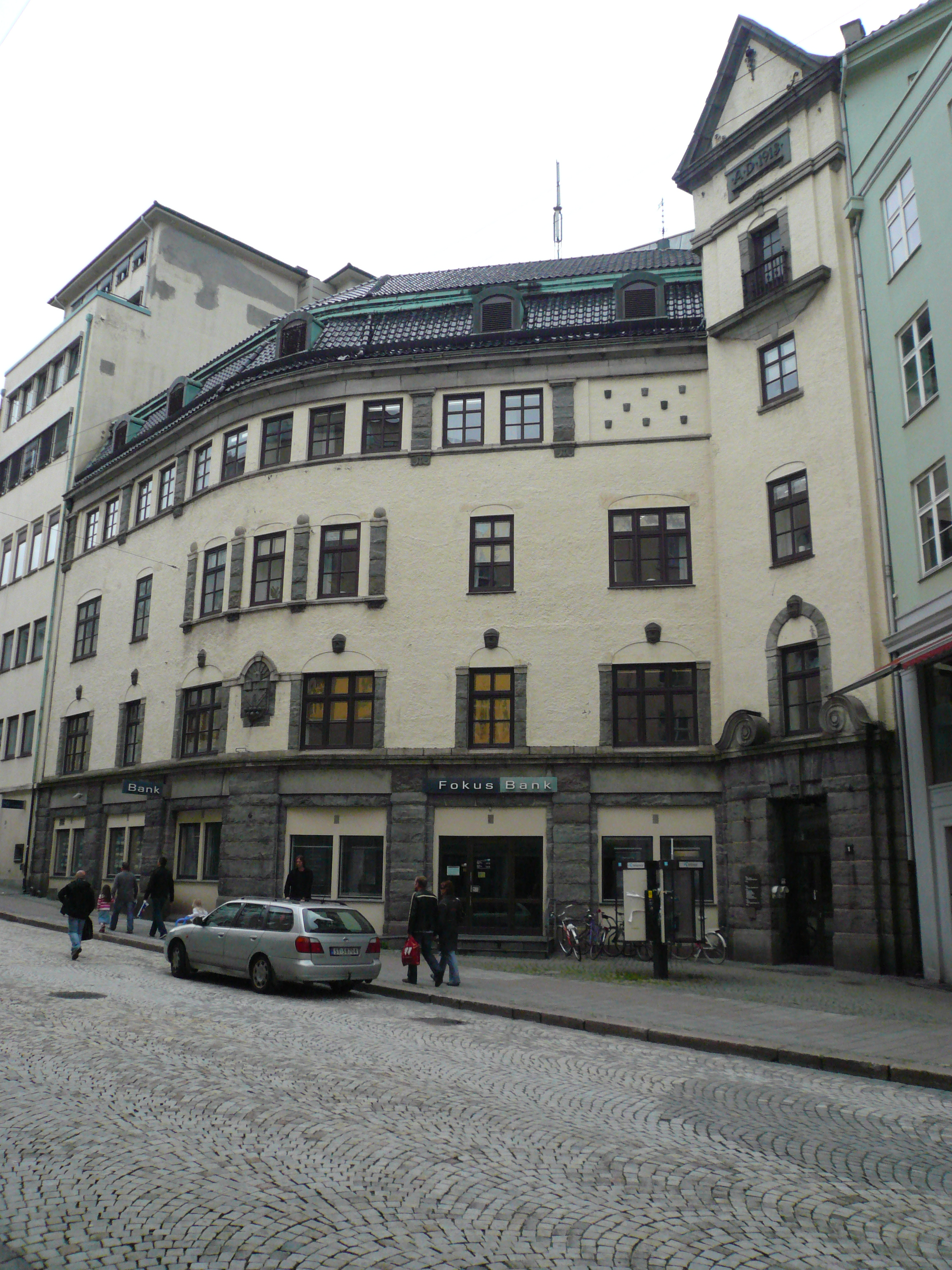
Bergens Telefonkompagni (1912)

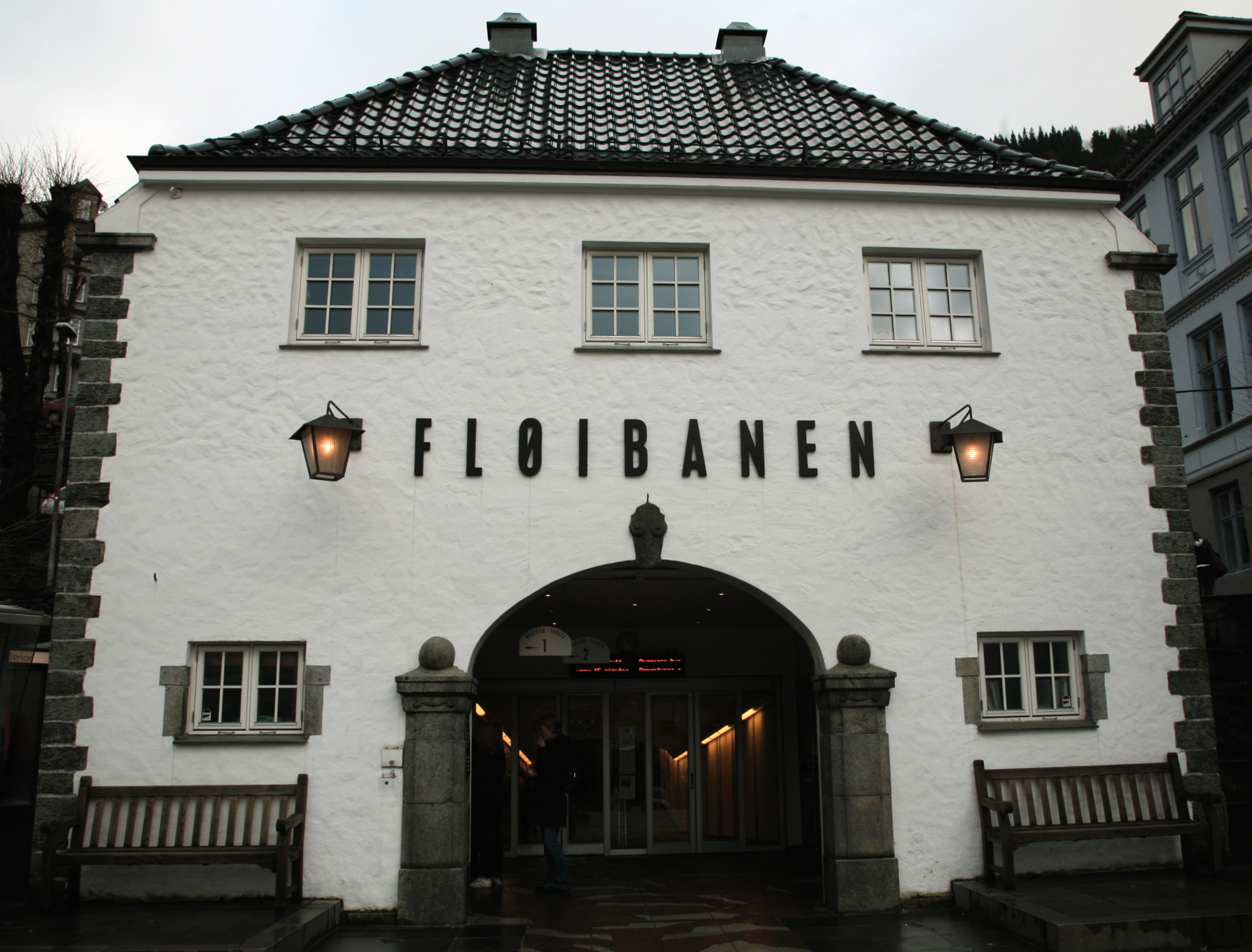
Nedre Fløibanestasjon (1918)

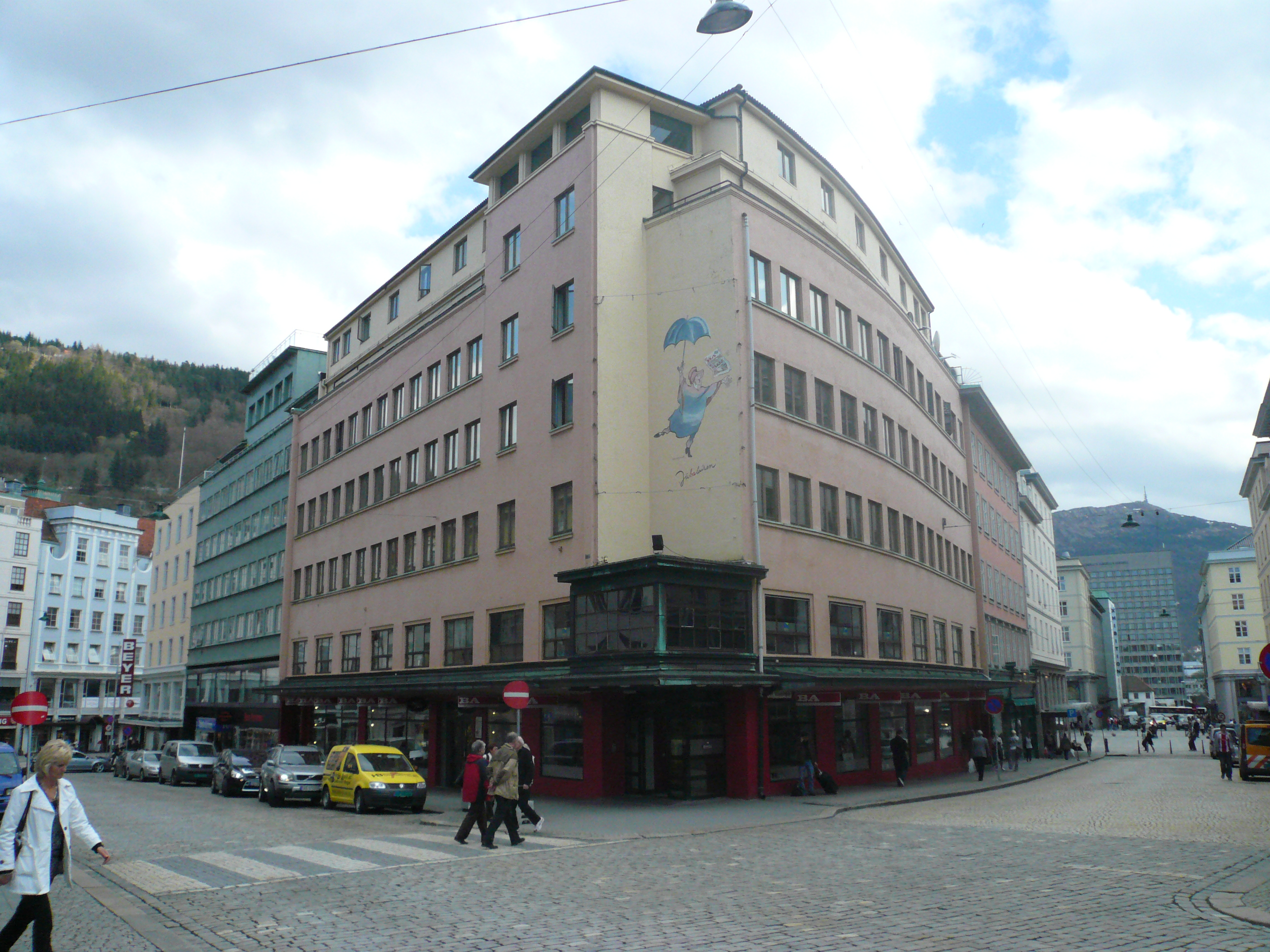
Bergen Arbeiderblads (1927)

== Other sources ==
- Aarseth, Asbjørn Den Nationale Scene : 1901-31 (Oslo: Gyldendal. 1969)
