= Torgallmenningen =

Square in Bergen

Coordinates: 60.393°N 5.324°E

Torgallmenningen, previously written Torvalmenningen, (General public square) is the main square of Bergen, Norway.

== Gallery ==
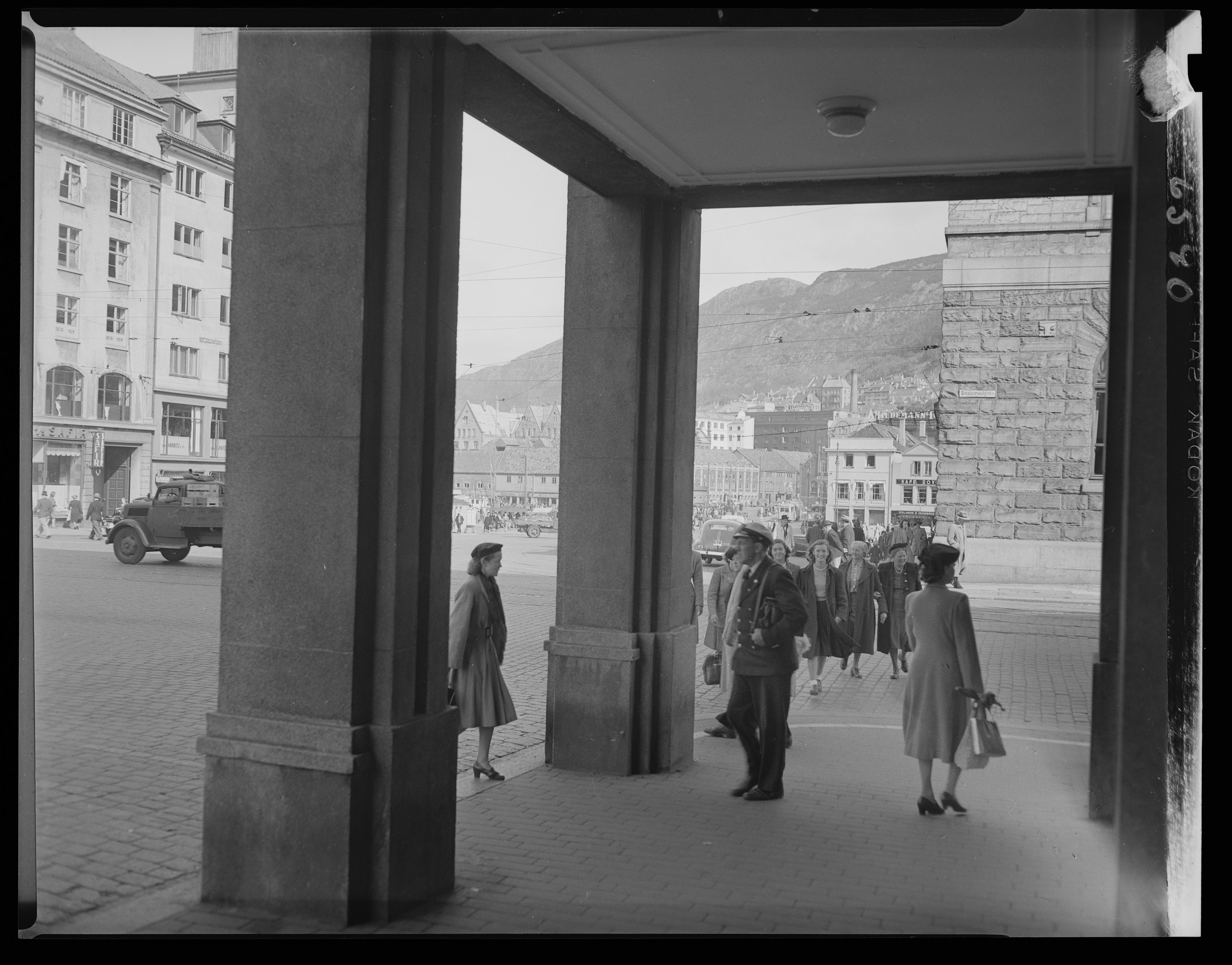
Torgallmenningen, late 1940s

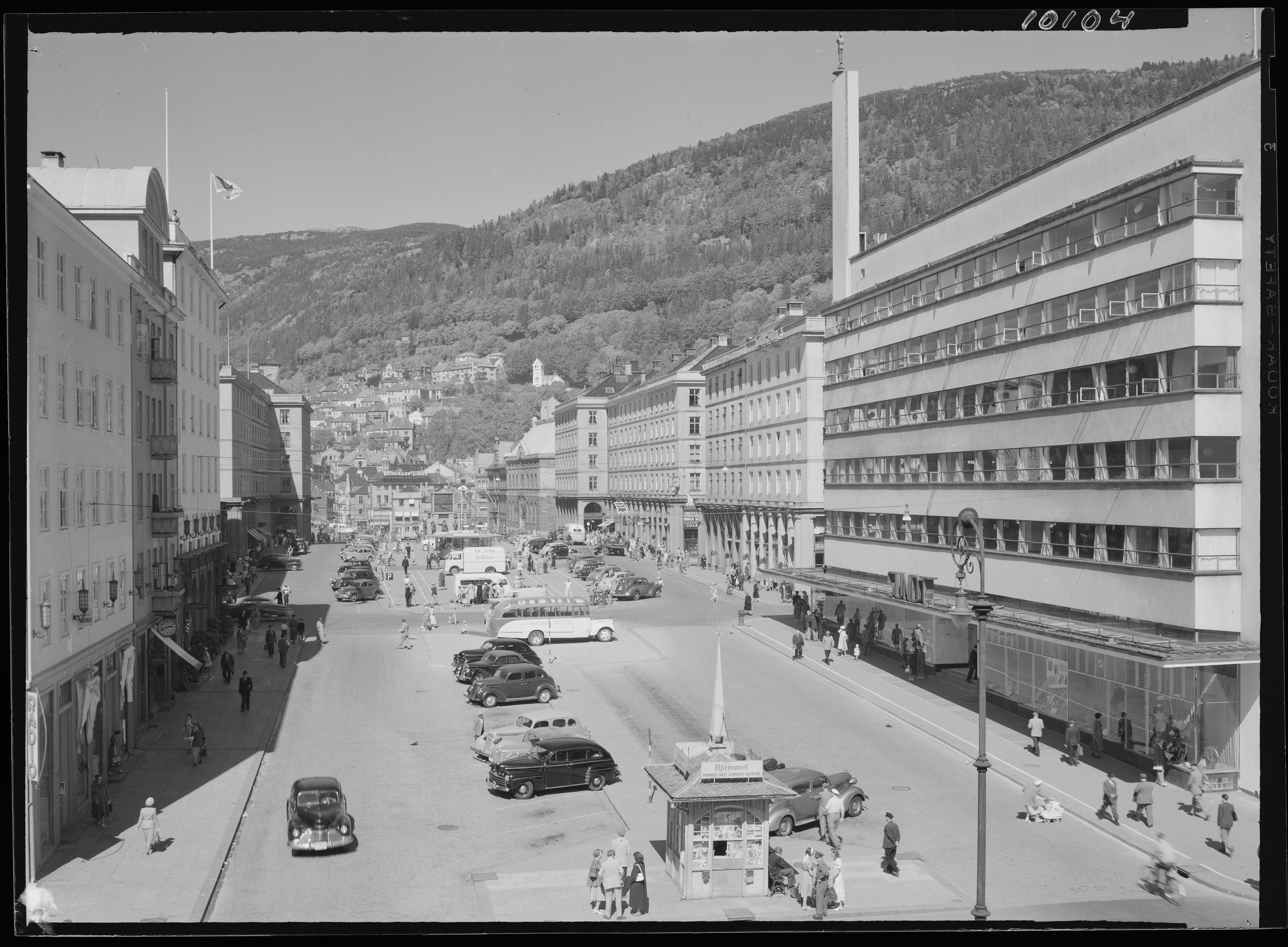
Torgallmenningen, 1950s

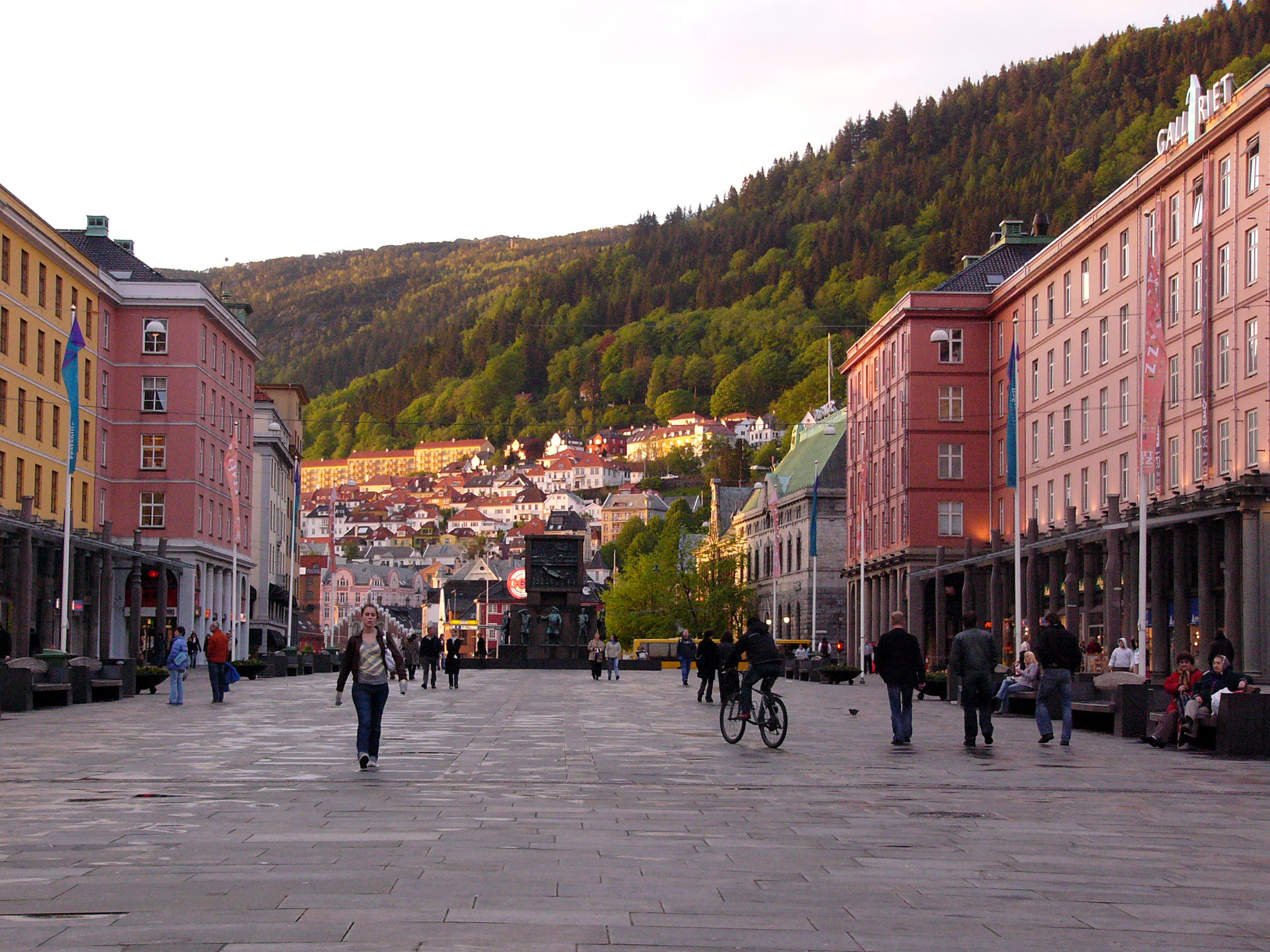
Torgallmenningen

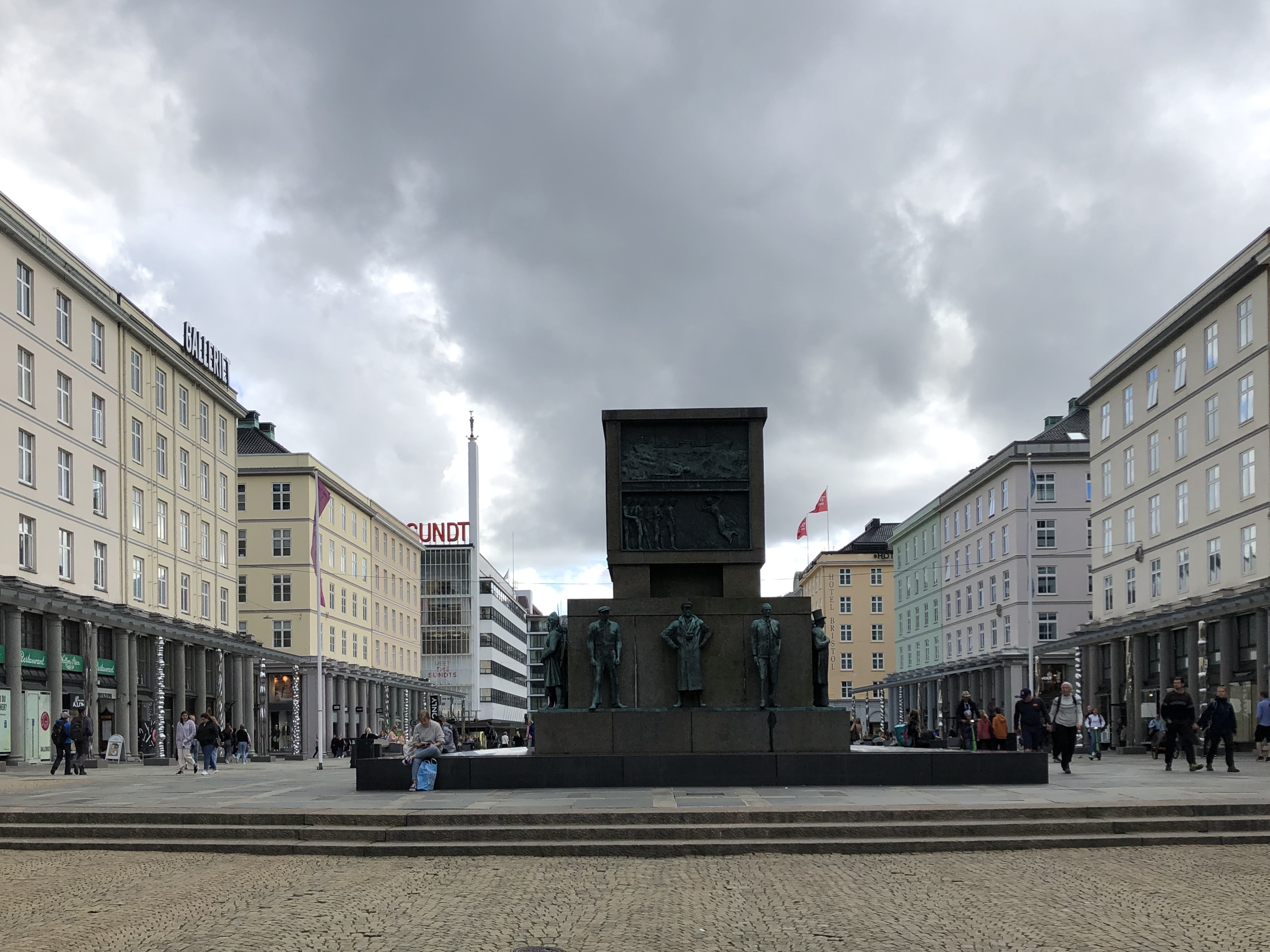

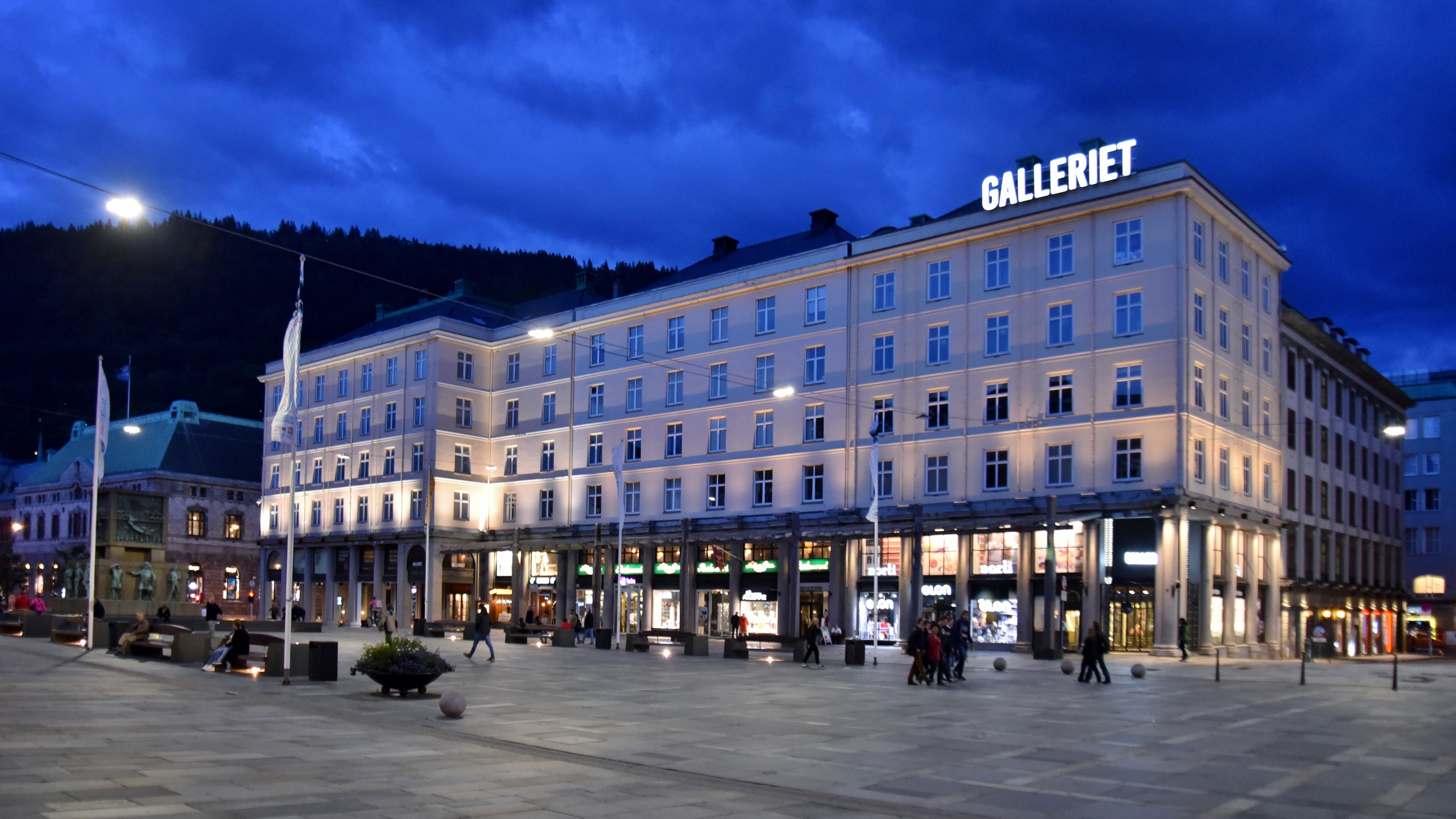
Night view of the Galleriet shopping mall

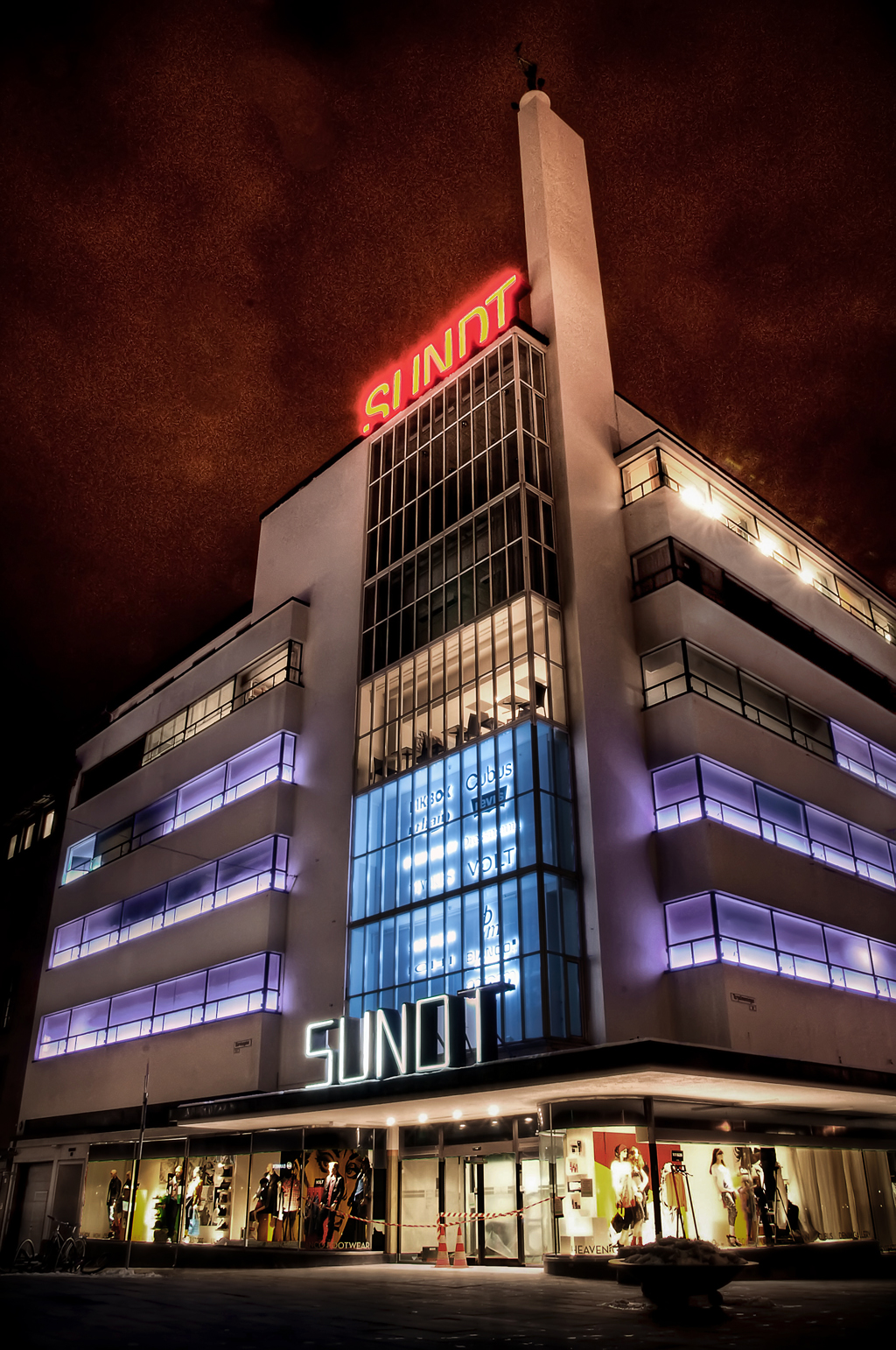
The Sundt building at night in 2011
