= Bergen landdistrikt =

Former municipality in Hordaland, Norway

Rural District of Bergen Bergen landdistrikt
- Former municipality
- Domkirken og Korskirken landsogn (historic name)
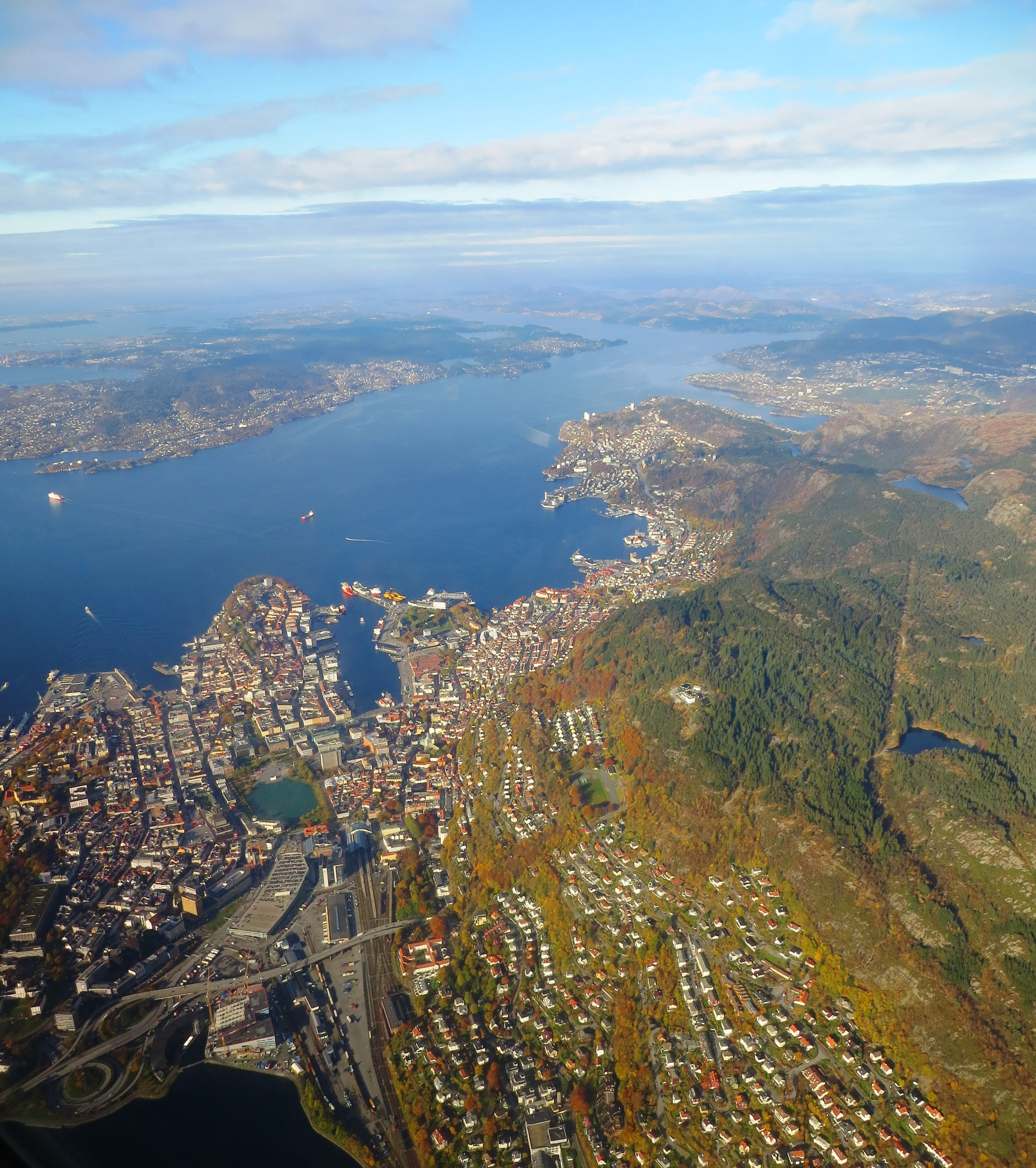
- Bergen landdistrikt included the areas south of the city centre (the small bay and peninsula in the centre of the photo) and on the east side, along the fjord.

- Hordaland within Norway

- Bergen landdistrikt within Hordaland
- Coordinates: 60°23′30″N 05°21′07″E
- Country: Norway
- County: Hordaland
- District: Midhordland
- Established: 1 Jan 1838
  - Created as: Formannskapsdistrikt
- Disestablished: 1 Jan 1877
  - Succeeded by: Bergen Municipality
- Administrative centre: Bergen

Government
  - Mayor (1870–1876): Ditlef Bruland

Area (upon dissolution)
  - Total: 5 km^{2} (1.9 sq mi)
- Highest elevation: 568 m (1,864 ft)

Population (1877)
  - Total: 4,883
  - Density: 980/km^{2} (2,500/sq mi)
- Demonym(s): Bergenser; Bergensar
- Time zone: UTC+01:00 (CET)
  - Summer (DST): UTC+02:00 (CEST)
- ISO 3166 code: NO-1281

Bergen landdistrikt (lit. 'Bergen rural district') is a former municipality in the old Hordaland county, Norway. The 5-square-kilometre (1.9 sq mi) municipality existed from 1838 until its dissolution in 1877. The area is now part of Bergen Municipality in the traditional district of Midhordland in Vestland county. The administrative centre was located in the city of Bergen, which was technically in a neighboring municipality. The municipality included the present-day neighborhoods of Møhlenpris, Nygård, Kalfaret, Sandviken, and Ytre Sandviken as well as the area around the mountains Fløyfjellet and Sandviksfjellet.

== General information ==
The city of Bergen has been established for centuries, but the exact boundaries were not clear. From 1776 to 1789, the royal boundary surveying commission conducted a survey of the area to formally establish the boundaries of the city. The areas that were left outside the city boundaries were still part of the local Domkirken and Holy Cross Church parishes. The areas outside the city limits were referred to as the rural parishes of the city's churches. The area south of the city was called the Domkirken landsogn and the area east of the city was the Korskirkens landsokn ("landsogn" means rural parish).

On 1 January 1838, all parishes in Norway were established as civil municipalities under the new formannskapsdistrikt law. The city of Bergen was its own city-municipality. The two "rural parishes" of Bergen Cathedral and Holy Cross Church were merged to form the rural municipality called "Bergen landdistrikt". Initially, the new municipality had about 1500 residents.

In 1873, the city of Bergen requested that Parliament transfer the Bergen landdistrikt into the city since a large part of the inhabitants of the rural parish worked in the city, and many of the city's businesses were located in Bergen landdistrikt. The rural parish was against the merger, but the Parliament agreed with the city and Bergen landdistrikt was incorporated into the city of Bergen on 1 January 1877. There were 4,883 residents of the municipality at the time of its dissolution. Upon the merger, the municipality was transferred to the city, but it also switched from Søndre Bergenhus county to Bergen county.

=== Name ===
The municipality (originally the parish) is named after the neighboring city of Bergen (Old Norse: Bjǫrgvin). The first element comes from the word bjǫrg which means "mountain" and the word vin which means "meadow" or "pasture". The last element of the name is the modern Norwegian word landdistrikt meaning "rural district" since it was the rural area surrounding the city.

== Geography ==
The small municipality encompassed the rural suburbs around the city of Bergen on three sides. It was bordered by mountains to the north and a valley to the south. The highest point in the municipality was the 568-metre (1,864 ft) tall mountain Rundemanen, located along the northern border with Hammer Municipality. Hammer Municipality was located to the north, Aarstad Municipality was located to the east and south, and the city of Bergen was located to the west.

== Government ==
During its existence, Bergen landdistrikt (municipality) was governed by a municipal council of directly elected representatives. The mayor was indirectly elected by a vote of the municipal council.

=== Mayors ===
The mayors (Norwegian: ordfører) of Bergen landdistrikt was the political leader of the municipality and the chairperson of the municipal council. The following people have held this position:

Term began	Term ended	Name
1839	1839	Jacob Ludvig Gerhard Pleym
1840	1845	Ferdinand Valentinsen
1847	1854	Rasmus Rolfsen
1856	1857	Christian Mohn
1860	1867	Rasmus Rolfsen
1868	1868	W. Reehorst
1869	1869	Lyder Nicolaisen
1870	1876	Ditlef Bruland

== See also ==
- List of former municipalities of Norway
