= List of cities claimed to be built on seven hills =

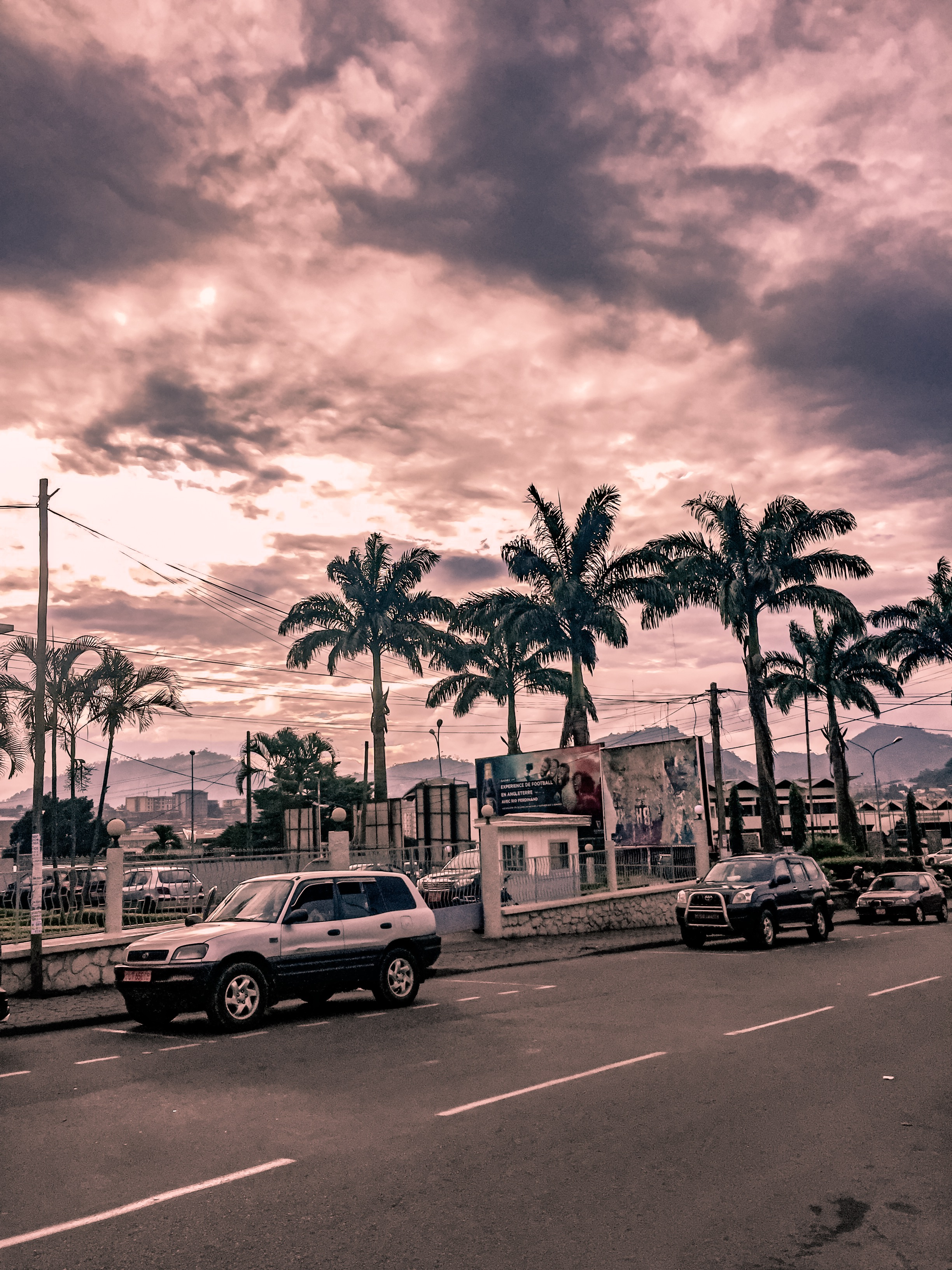
Sunset view of hills in the city of Yaoundé, Cameroon

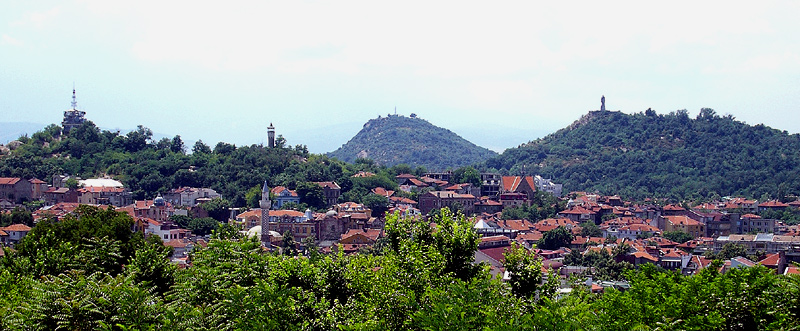
Hills in Plovdiv, Bulgaria

The title City of Seven Hills usually refers to Rome, which was founded on seven hills. However, there are many other cities that make the same claim, generally in imitation of Rome.

When a city claims to be a city built on hills, the number seven is used far more than any other number, regardless of how many hills the city may actually have. For example, travel writer William Henry Koebel wrote in 1909: "Oporto constitutes yet another of those many cities that profess to be built upon seven hills. The reason why such a number of cities lay claim to this mystic number is as cryptic as the fashion in which the particular elevations are singled out for fame. As a matter of fact, were one to make a point of observing closely the contour of the majority of these places, knowing nothing of the claim, it is very seldom that the precise number would be arrived at. But there is no reason to labour the point. If a city takes any especial pride in covering seven hills, it is both unprofitable and unkind to dispute it. Therefore one must allow Oporto without any further question its seven hills—and all the others besides."

Scholar Gościwit Malinowski notes that most European countries have a city claiming seven hills, to denote the city as "ancient, unique, and a capital city. The recognition of the seven hills means the town becomes a local Rome and a local microcosm." Even cities older than Rome have adopted claims of having seven hills, including Athens. Moreover, during the age of European colonization, many new cities being founded or taken under control were given their claims of seven hills. Similarly, the fledgling United States, founded in an area of classicism, birthed many more towns with seven hills.

Caroline Vout observes in her book The Hills of Rome: Signature of an Eternal City (2012) that a visit to cities claiming seven hills "reveals that their 'seven hills' are a sales-pitch rather than a reality. The currency of the seven hills goes beyond western culture to imply a universal, or at least transferable, idea of 'citiness'.

== Africa ==
=== Cameroon ===
- Yaoundé

=== Nigeria ===
- Ibadan – Built on Oke Padre, Oke Ado, Oke Bola, Oke Mapo, Oke Are, Oke Sapati, Oke Mokola.

=== Spain ===
- Ceuta (Ceuta is an autonomous city of Spain located on the coast of Northern Africa. Although it belongs to a European country and is a part of the European Union as a special territory, it is geographically located on the continent of Africa. Physical attributes of the city, such as hills, are in Africa, not Europe.)

=== Uganda ===
- Kampala, Uganda – The hills are Mengo, Lubaga, Namirembe, Old Kampala, Kibuli, Nakasero and Makerere

== Americas ==
=== Argentina ===
- Victoria, Entre Ríos

=== Ecuador ===
- Guaranda

=== Mexico ===
- Chicontepec de Tejeda, whose name is Nahuatl for "on seven hills"

=== Paraguay ===
- Asunción

=== United States ===
- Albany, New York
- Athens, Texas
- Cincinnati, Ohio
- Dubuque, Iowa
- Lynchburg, Virginia – College Hill, Garland Hill, Daniel's Hill, Federal Hill, Diamond Hill, White Rock Hill, and Franklin Hill were the original "Seven Hills" of the City of Lynchburg.
- Nevada City, California – Which are the seven is debated. There is also a middle school and business district called Seven Hills.
- Rome, Georgia - City was founded with name Rome in 1834, the seven hills claims likely sprang from its naming.
- Richmond, Virginia – Built on numerous hills and escarpments to include Union Hill, Church Hill, Council Chamber Hill, Shockoe Hill, Gambles Hill, Navy Hill and Oregon Hill, but there have been no agreement which "seven hills" are in mind.
- Saint Paul, Minnesota – The exact list of seven hills varies, but every list includes Cathedral Hill, Capitol Hill, Dayton's Bluff, Crocus Hill (sometimes also called St. Clair), and Williams Hill—which is no longer a hill.
- Seattle, Washington (see Seven hills of Seattle)
- Slinger, Wisconsin - Often referred to as the Village of Seven Hills
- Somerville, Massachusetts – Built on Clarendon Hill, College Hill, Spring Hill, Winter Hill, Central Hill, Plowed Hill, Cobble Hill.
- Tallahassee, Florida – Goodwood Plantation, Old Fort Park, Mission San Luis, Old Capitol, The Grove, FAMU (Lee Hall), FSU (Westcott Hall)
- Worcester, Massachusetts – Built on Pakachoag (Mount St. James), Sagatabscot (Union Hill), Hancock Hill, Chandler Hill (Belmosy Hill), Green Hill, Bancroft Hill, and Newton Hill
- Yonkers, New York

=== Venezuela ===
- Valera, Trujillo

== Asia ==
=== India ===
- Shimla (see Seven Hills of Shimla) – The seven hills are Jakhu Hill, Summer Hill, Bantony Hill, Inveram Hill, Elysium Hill, Observatory Hill and Prospect Hill.

=== Jordan ===
- Amman - the seven hills are Qusur, Jufa, Taj, Nazha, Nasser, Natheef, and al-Akhdar.

== Europe ==
=== Belgium ===
- Brussels – Said to be built on St. Michielsberg, Koudenberg, Warmoesberg, Kruidtuin, Kunstberg, Zavel and St. Pietersberg

=== Bulgaria ===
- Plovdiv – Was originally built on seven hills but now only has six due to one being destroyed in the early 20th century (Markovo tepe)

=== Croatia ===
- Pula (Monte Zaro, Monte Serpente, Monte Ghiro, Monte Magno, Monte Paradiso, Monte Rizzi and Monte Vidal)

=== Czech Republic ===
- Prague – Said to be built on seven or nine hills: Hradčany, Vítkov, (Opyš), Větrov, Skalka, (Emauzy), Vyšehrad, Karlov and Petřín

=== France ===
- Besançon
- Saint-Étienne
- Toulon
- Tulle

=== Germany ===
- Bamberg, The seven hills of Bamberg are; Cathedral Hill, Michaelsberg, Kaulberg/Obere Pfarre, Stefansberg, Jakobsberg, Altenburger Hill, and Abtsberg.
- Siegen

=== Greece ===
- Athens. The historical seven hills of Athens are Acropolis, Areopagus, Philopappou, Hill of the Nymphs, Pnyx, Lycabettus, and Tourkovounia. The claim of seven hills did not exist in Ancient Greece, but is a later development to emulate Rome.

=== Hungary ===
- Kaposvár
- Veszprém

=== Italy ===
- Bergamo
- Cagliari
- Cosenza
- Rome (see Seven hills of Rome)

=== Lithuania ===
- Telšiai
- Vilnius

=== Moldova ===
- Chișinău

=== Netherlands ===
- Aalten – Village (no town privileges) said to be built on seven hills.
- Nijmegen – Seven hills within the 16c–19c city wall: Geertruidsberg, Hofberg (Valkhof), Lindenberg, Jansberg, Hundisberg, Hessenberg and a) Marienberg or b) Hoofdberg.
- Zevenbergen – Oronyms unknown, except Molenberg.

=== Norway ===
- Bergen – Built not on but between seven mountains. See Seven Mountains, Bergen. The claim was invented by Ludvig Holberg (1684-1754).

=== Poland ===
- Gorzów Wielkopolski
- Sandomierz

=== Portugal ===
- Lisbon, São Jorge, São Vicente, Sant'Ana, Santo André, Chagas, Santa Catarina, São Roque

=== Romania ===
- Bucharest (Mihai Vodă, Dealul Mitropoliei, Radu Vodă, Cotroceni, Dealul Spirii, Văcărești, and Sfântu Gheorghe Nou)
- Iaşi (see Seven hills of Iaşi)

=== Russia ===
- Moscow (See Seven hills of Moscow)

=== Slovenia ===
- Maribor, seven hills are Pohorje, Kozjak, Kalvarija, Mestni vrh, Piramida, Meljski hrib and Pekrska gorca.

=== Spain ===
- Barcelona, is said to be built on Turó del Carmel, Turó de la Rovira, Turó de la Creueta del Coll, Turó de la Peira, Turó del Putxet, Turó de Monterols and Turó de Modolell. Others exclude the latter and include Montjuïc and Mont Tàber, the 17 m hill where the Roman city of Barcino was built.
- Cáceres
- Madrid

=== Turkey ===
- Istanbul (see Seven hills of Istanbul). While perhaps inevitable that the city of Constantinople, becoming the new capital of the Roman Empire, would come to be described as having seven hills, it is not until Petrus Gyllius wrote in the 16th century of the city having seven hills that there is clear evidence of it having happened. Gyllius started a general description of the city in his work De Topographia Constantinopoleos by stating that "Constantinople occupies a peninsula embracing seven hills," and that while "it is easy to distinguish Rome's hills, which Nature made discrete from their valleys," it is not so easy to do for Constantinople.

=== United Kingdom ===
==== England ====
- Bath, Somerset
- Bristol
- Durham
- Liverpool
- Sheffield

==== Northern Ireland ====
- Armagh

==== Scotland ====
- Edinburgh (see Hills of Edinburgh)

==== Wales ====
- Abergavenny

== Oceania ==
=== Australia ===
- Brisbane – The historic seven hills of Brisbane were known as Spring Hill, Kangaroo Point, Highgate Hill, Paddington, Red Hill, Bowen Hills, and Wickham Terrace.
- Western Sydney – The seven or eight hills are found in Sydney's northwestern suburbs: Castle Hill, Baulkham Hills, Rooty Hill, Seven Hills, Prospect Hill, Beaumont Hills, Rouse Hill and Constitution Hill.
- Melbourne – Flagstaff Hill, Batmans Hill, Emerald Hill, Eastern Hill, Richmond Hill, Princes Hill, Hotham Hill

== See also ==
- Seven hills (disambiguation)
- Revelation 17 – Mentions a beast on seven hills
