= Seven hills of Seattle =

Geographic feature of Seattle, US

The term seven hills of Seattle refers unofficially to the hills the U.S. city was built on and around, though there is no consensus on exactly which hills it refers to. The term has been used to refer to several other cities, most notably Rome and Constantinople.

== The seven hills ==
Walt Crowley considered the main candidates for the seven hills to be:

- First Hill, nicknamed "Pill Hill" because of the many hospitals and medical clinics located there
- Yesler Hill – currently Yesler Terrace
- Cherry Hill – located to the east of First Hill (previously called Second Hill or Renton Hill – both these names have passed out of common usage)
- Denny Hill – regraded, now called the Denny Regrade
- Capitol Hill
- Queen Anne Hill
- Beacon Hill

The hills above were associated with seven boulders in the City of Seattle's Seven Hills Park.

Other hills people sometimes consider among the "seven hills of Seattle" include:

- West Seattle – originally incorporated as a separate city, and not annexed by Seattle until 1907
- Magnolia
- Graham Hill
- Crown Hill – not annexed until 1954
- Mount Baker

== Geology ==
Seattle's topography is due largely to Pleistocene ice age glaciation. Nearly all of the city's seven hills are characterized as drumlins (Beacon Hill, First Hill, Capitol Hill, Queen Anne Hill, Mount Baker) or drift uplands (Magnolia, West Seattle).

== "Seven Hills of Seattle" annual walk ==
The Seattle-Bergen Sister City Association (Sister Cities International) sponsors an annual "Seven Hills of Seattle" walk. Seattle's sister city, Bergen, Norway, is known as the City of Seven Mountains.

== See also ==
- List of cities claimed to be built on seven hills
- Seven hills of Rome – probably the origin of the romanticism of 'seven hills'
- History of Seattle before 1900
- Seven hills (disambiguation)
