= Borovitsky =

Borovitsky (masculine), Borovitskaya (feminine), or Borovitskoye (neuter) may refer to:

- Borovitsky Hill, former name of Kremlin Hill, one of the seven hills of Moscow
- Borovitskaya (Metro), a station of the Moscow Metro
- Borovitskaya Square, a square in Moscow, Russia
- Borovitskaya Tower, one of the Kremlin towers
