= Blåmannen =

Blåmannen may refer to:

== Places ==
- Store Blåmannen, a mountain in Tromsø Municipality in Troms county, Norway
- Blåmanen, a mountain in Bergen Municipality in Vestland county, Norway
- Blåmannen (Nordland), a mountain in Fauske Municipality in Nordland county, Norway
