= Seven Hills, U.S. Virgin Islands =

Coordinates: 17°44′45″N 64°39′05″W

Seven Hills, United States Virgin Islands
- Village
- Interactive map of Seven Hills, United States Virgin Islands
- Country: United States Virgin Islands
- Island: Saint Croix
- Time zone: UTC-4 (AST)

Seven Hills is a settlement on the island of Saint Croix in the United States Virgin Islands.

== See also ==
- Seven hills (disambiguation)
