= Fløyen =

Mountain in Bergen, Norway

Fløyen Fløyfjellet
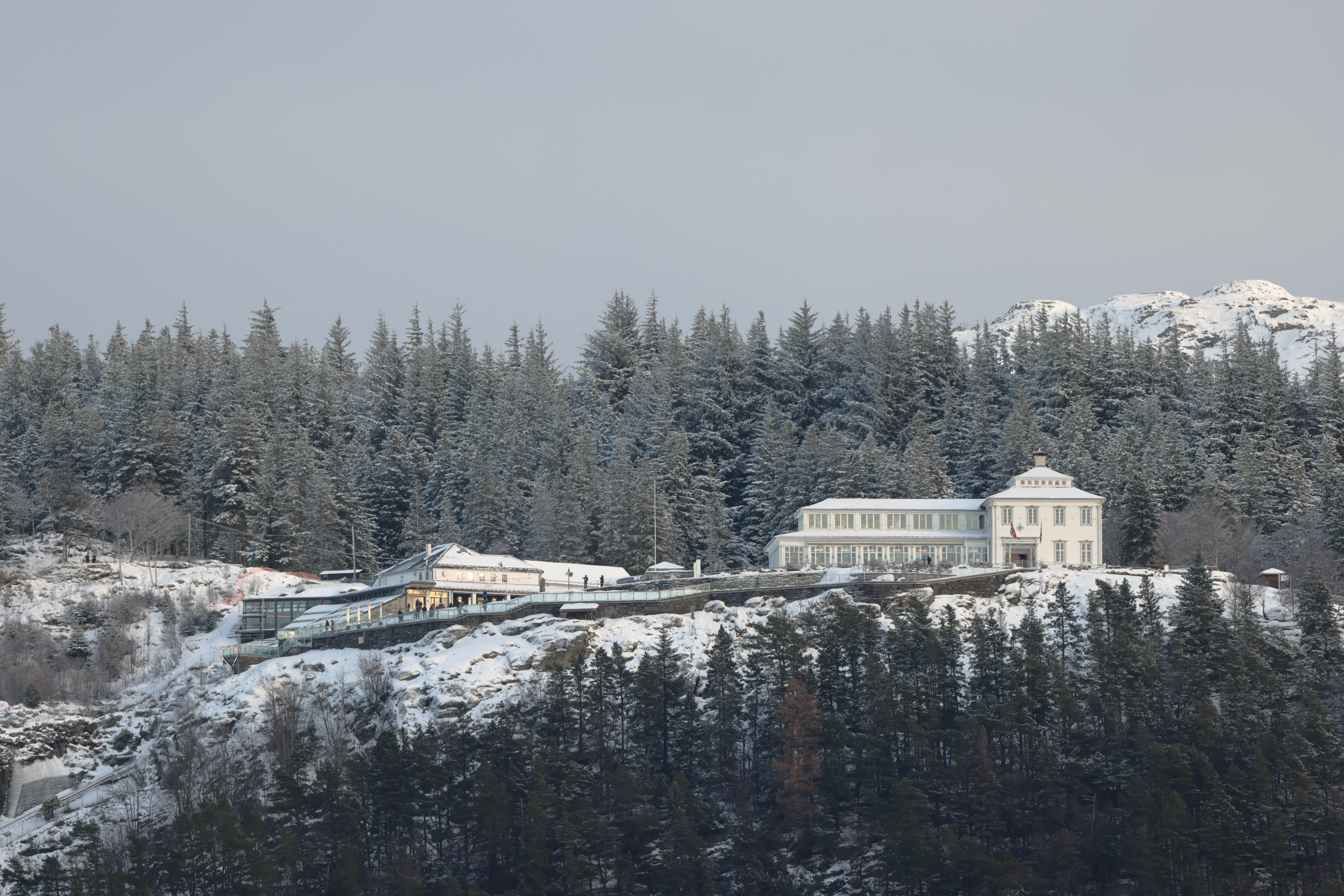

Highest point
- Elevation: 400 m (1,300 ft)
- Prominence: 18 m (59 ft)
- Parent peak: Hauggjelsvarden
- Isolation: 0.568 km (0.353 mi)
- Coordinates: 60°23′54″N 5°20′43″E

Geography
- Location: Vestland, Norway
- Topo map: 1115 I Bergen

Climbing
- Easiest route: funicular

Fløyen or Fløyfjellet is a mountain in Bergen Municipality in Vestland county, Norway. It is one of the "seven city mountains" that surround the centre of the city of Bergen. Its highest point is 400 m (1,300 ft) above sea level. The name could originate from fløystangen or a weather vane that was set up to indicate the direction of the wind for sailing ships. The view of the Bergen Peninsula makes Fløyfjellet a popular attraction among tourists and locals alike. The Fløibanen funicular transports passengers from the centre of Bergen to a height of 320 m (1,050 ft) in roughly eight minutes.

== Hiking ==
There are several hiking options on Fløyen itself, or one can continue further on to Vareggen or over Vidden to Ulriken. Fløyfjellet provides signed hiking roads to Blåmanen, Rundemannen, and Sandviksfjellet. At Midtfjellet at the foot of Blåmanen there is a kiosk called Brushytten.

The roads and paths down from Fløyen are floodlit in the winter months and are popular for sledding. There is also one road suitable for vehicular traffic, but the use of this is restricted to authorised vehicles.

== Fløibanen ==
Fløibanen is an 850-meter (2,790 ft)-long funicular that links Vetrlidsallmenningen, in Bergen city centre, with Fløyfjellet, at an altitude of 320 m (1,050 ft) and near the summit of Fløyen. The funicular also has three intermediate stations, at Promsgate, Fjellveien and Skansemyren, and it was opened in 1918. Since the opening Fløibanen has carried over 48 million people to and from Fløyfjellet. Over the past few years passenger numbers have averaged 1 million per year. Over the years, Fløibanen has cemented its position as Bergen's most popular tourist attraction and according to the Norwegian Council for Tourism, Fløibanen was Norway's fourth most visited tourist attraction in the 2001 summer season. Most of the traffic occurs in the summer months from May to September.

At Fløyfjellet, there is also a viewpoint. In 2002 the site was rebuilt for 46 million NOK, the viewpoint was extended and is called Fløytrappene. This is a broad staircase which goes from the station stop to Fløien Folkerestaurant.

== Gallery ==
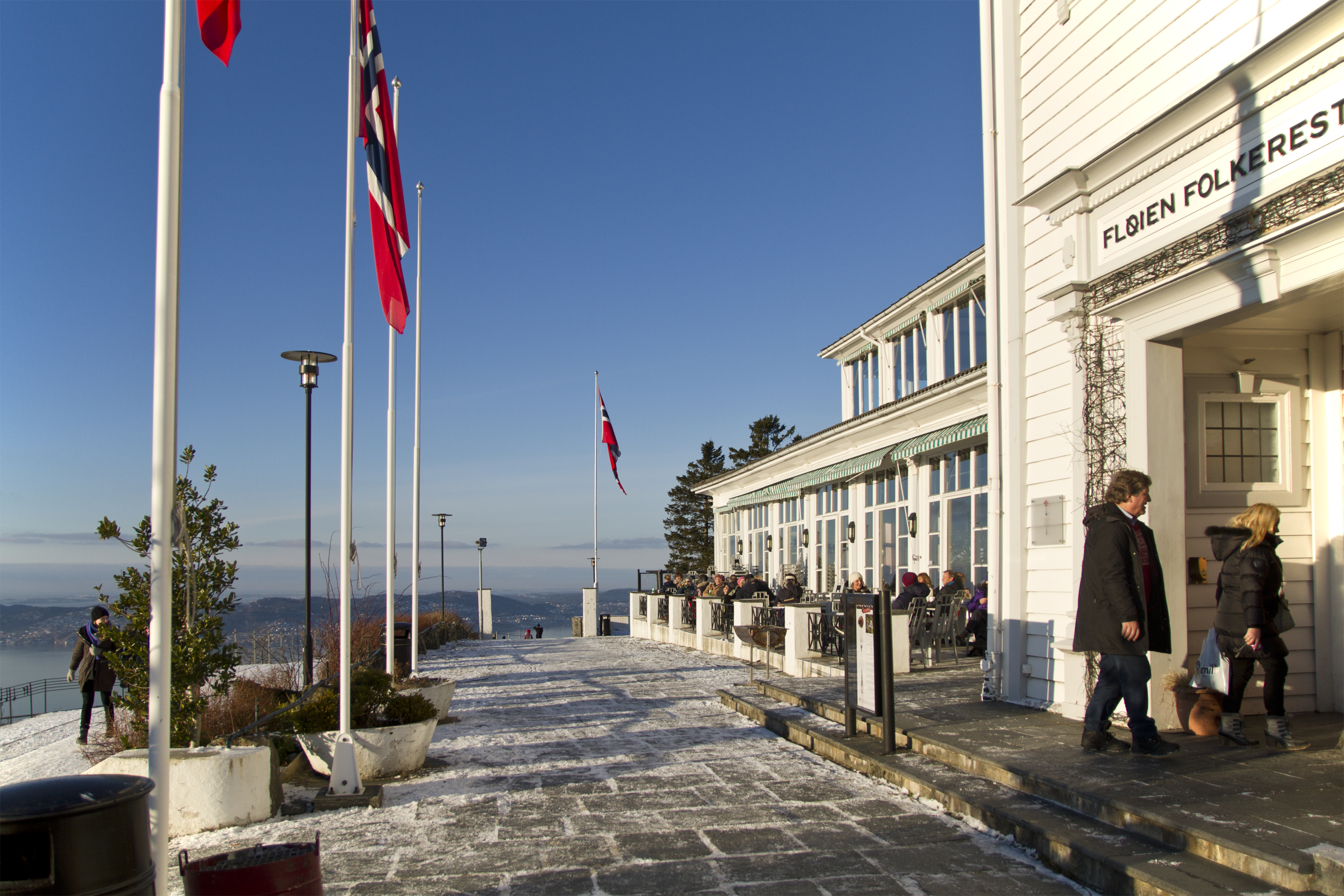
Fløyen Restaurant

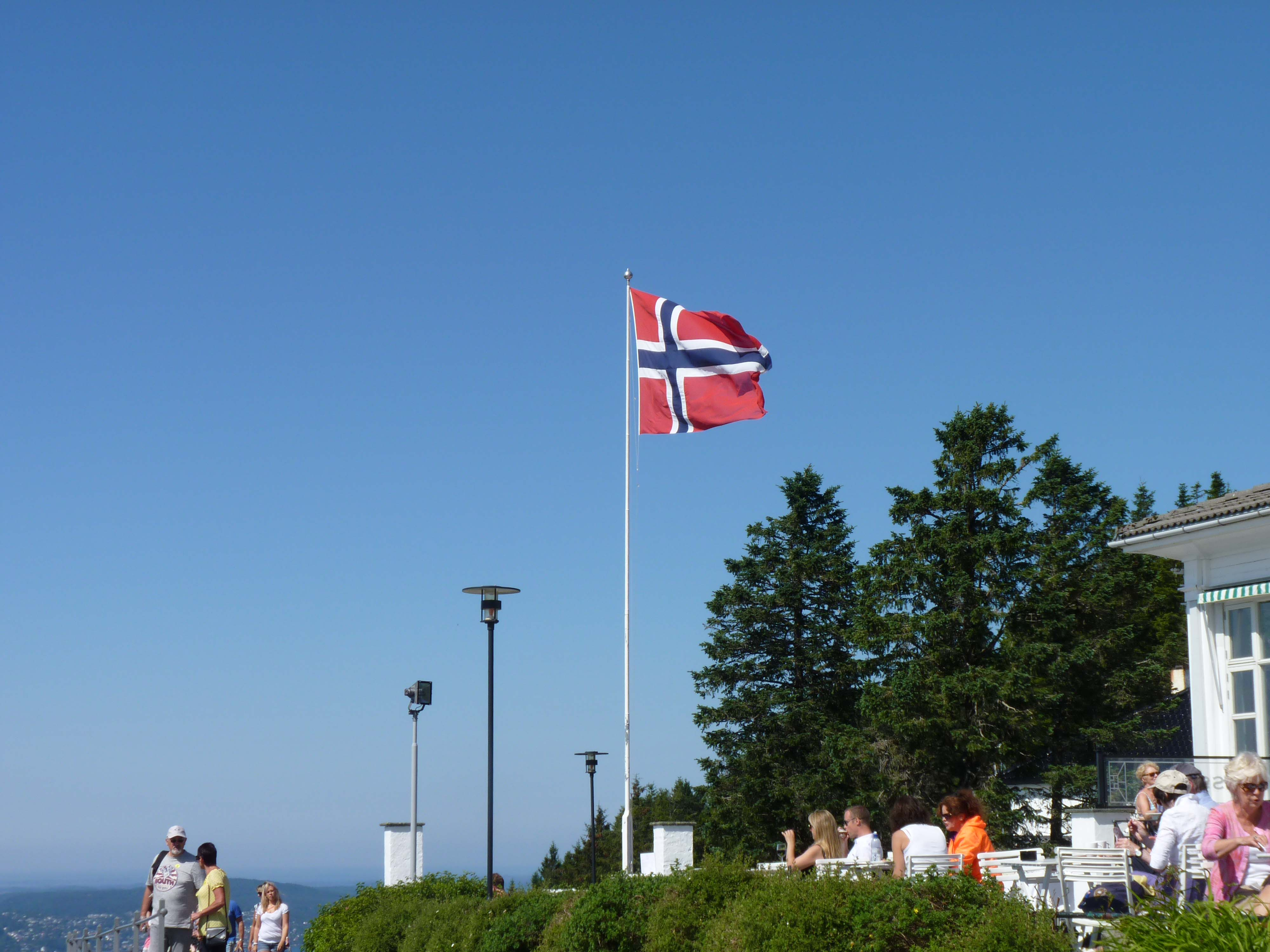
Norwegian flag atop Fløyen

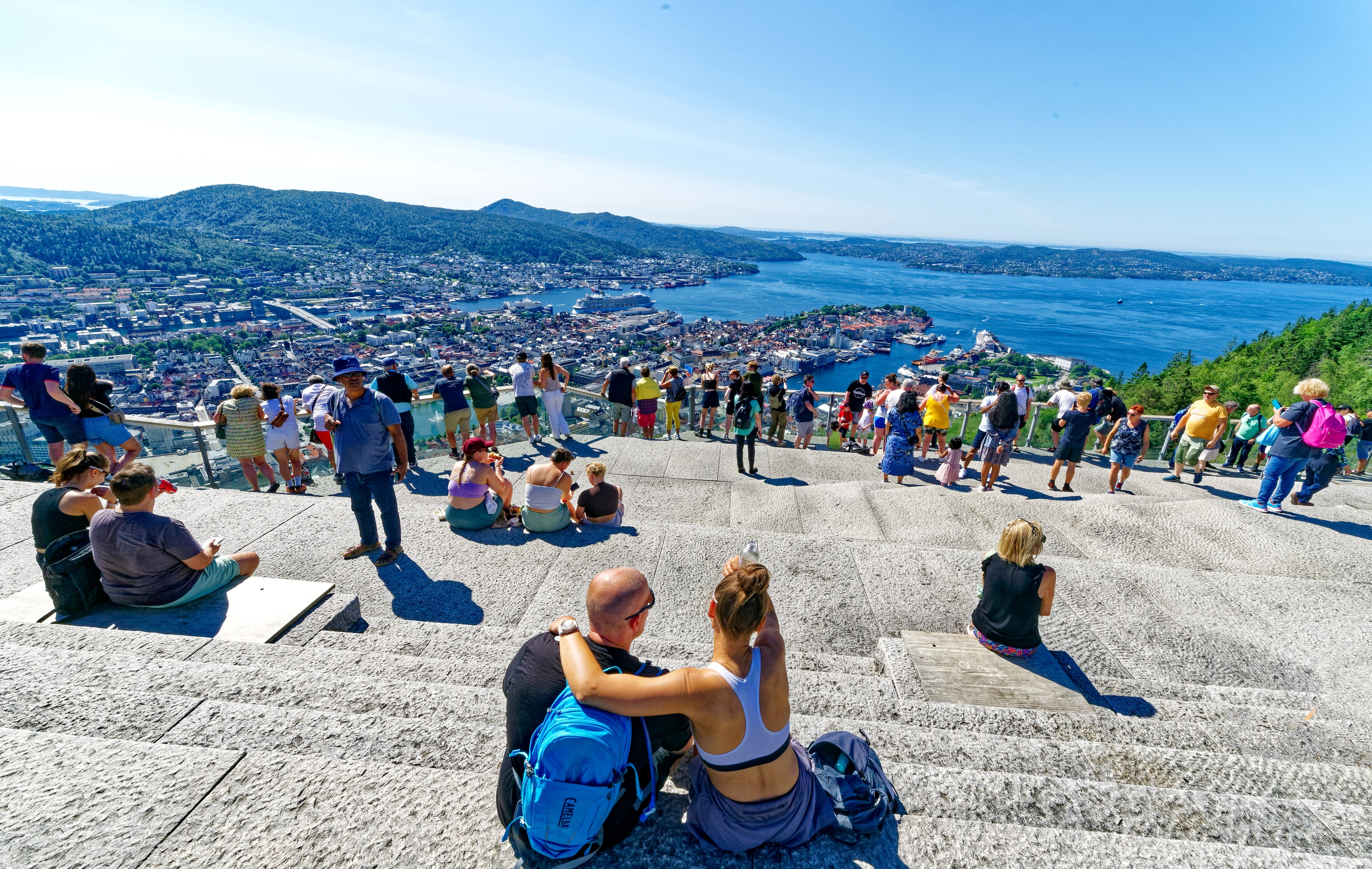
View of the city of Bergen from Fløyen

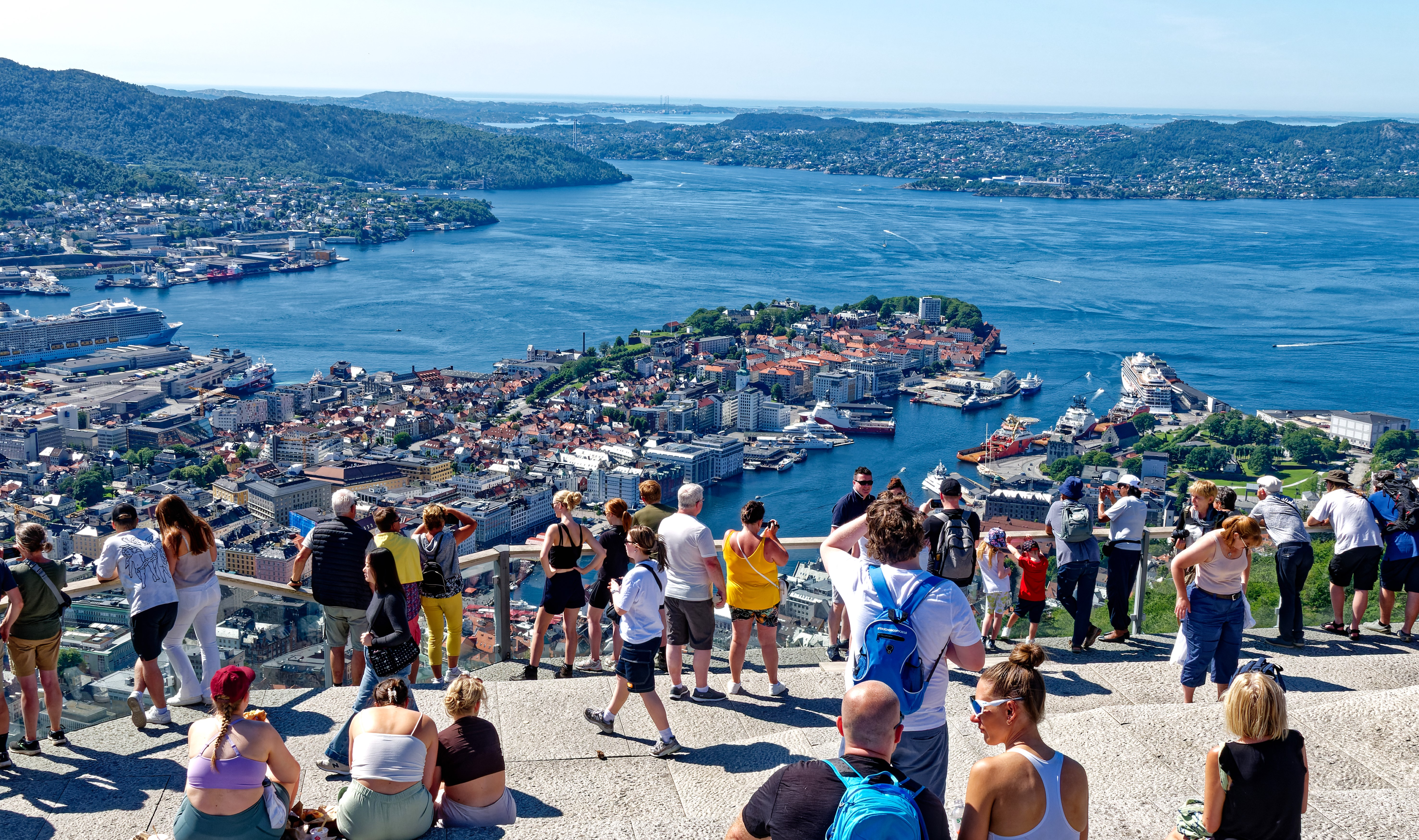

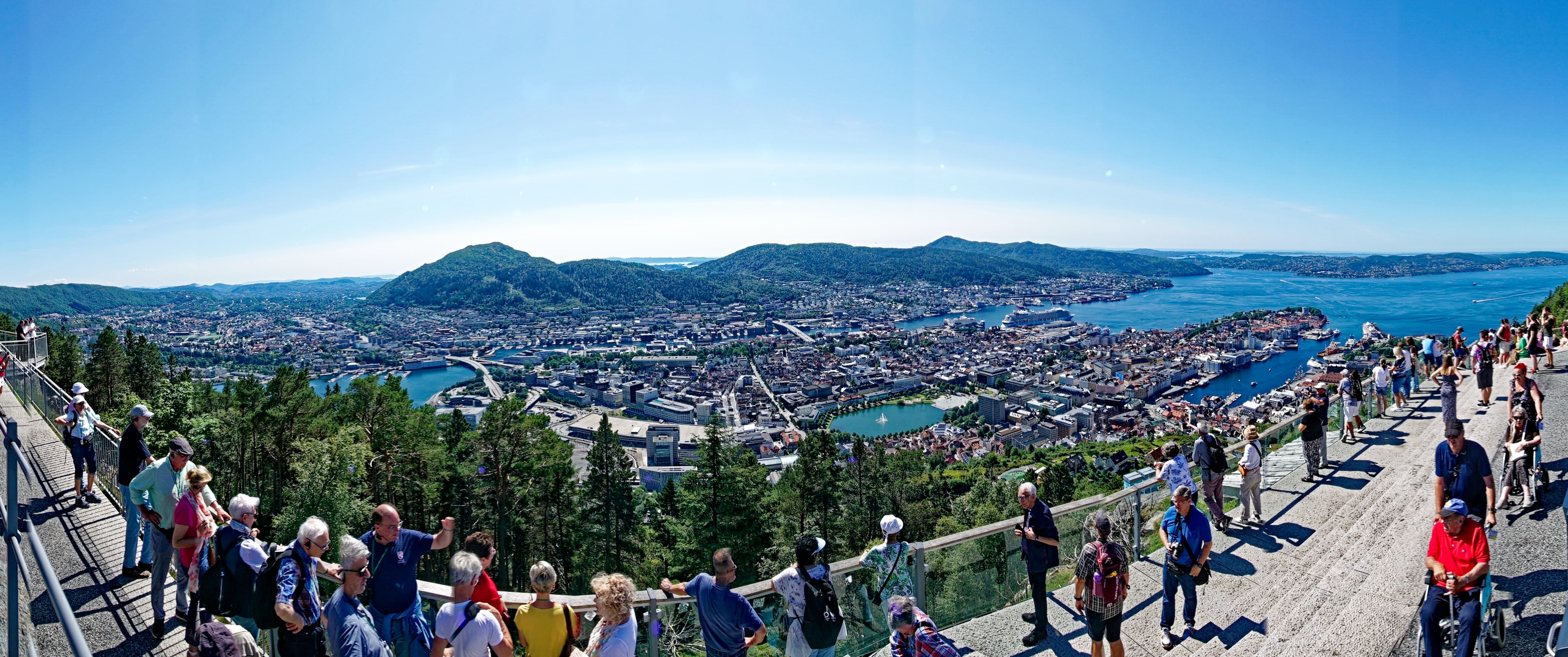
Panorama, 2023
