= Grigore Cobălcescu =

Romanian geologist and paleontologist (1831-1892)

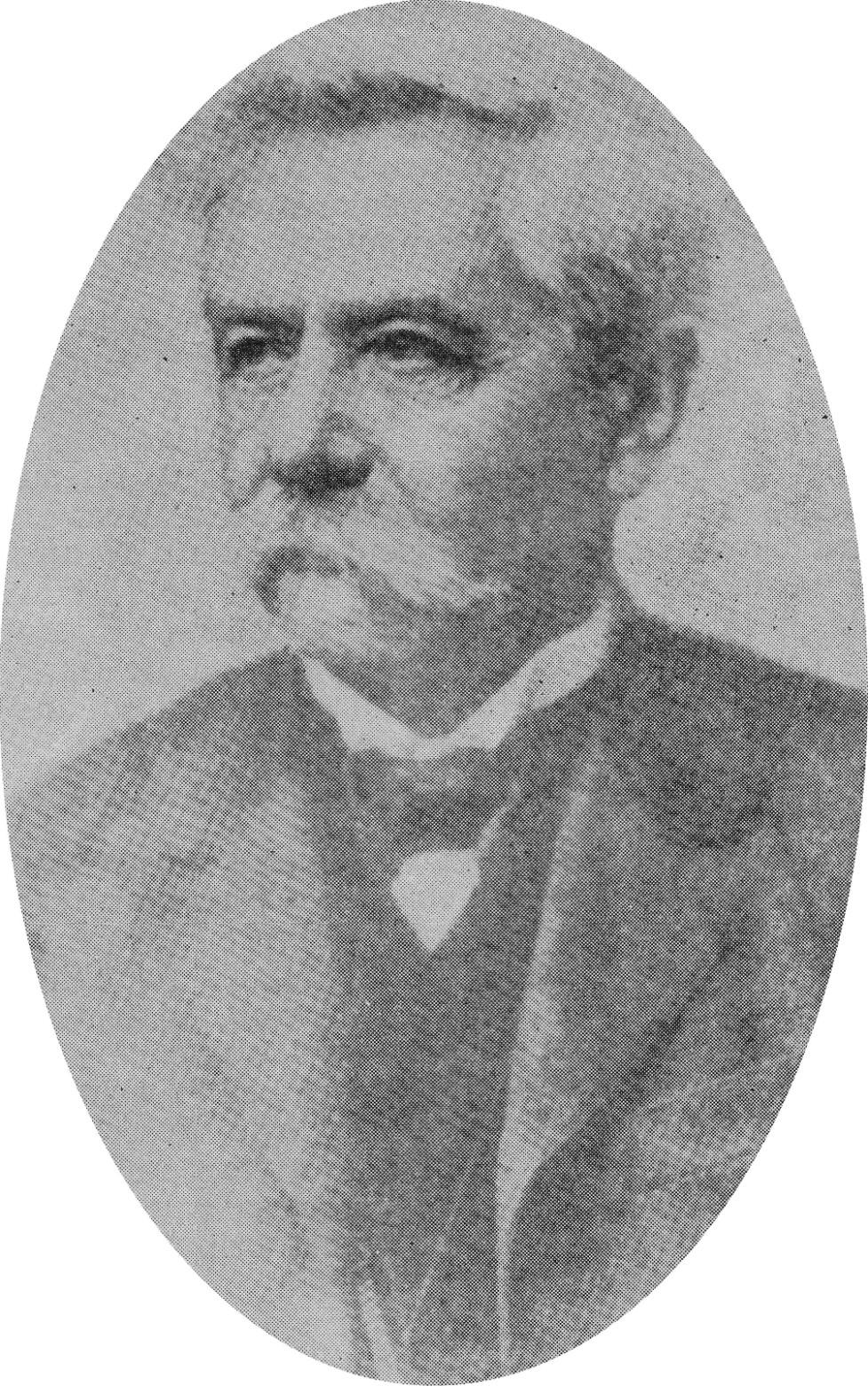
Grigore Cobălcescu

Grigore Cobălcescu (September 22, 1831 – May 21, 1892) was a Moldavian, later Romanian geologist and paleontologist who is credited with introducing both fields into his country.

Born in Iași, he graduated from the local Engineering and Architecture School in 1850. From that time until 1860, he taught at the city's high schools and actively promoted practical scientific education. From 1859 to 1862, he attended the University of Paris on a state scholarship, and returned with a degree in natural sciences. In January 1864, he became a professor at the University of Iași, in the philosophy faculty's physiology and geology department; he had begun teaching a course on natural sciences there in April 1862, as a volunteer. He remained a professor at the university until his death, and was dean of the sciences faculty from 1867 to 1870.

He was also involved in social and political life, and became Senator for the university in 1872. He was one of the few who protested against the commercial convention with Austria-Hungary, which he claimed "transforms Romania into a veritable colony of this empire", and resigned his seat following its adoption in 1875. However, his reputation rests on the fact that he was the founder of geology in Romania. The work with which he introduced this discipline to his country was the 1862 study Calcariul dela Răpidea ("The Limestone at Repedea"). Because he also described paleofauna and paleoflora therein, he is also viewed as the father of Romanian paleontology.

His most important works, however, are considered to be Studii geologice și paleontologice asupra unor tărâmuri terțiare din unele părți ale României ("Geological and Paleontological Studies of Certain Tertiary Formations in Some Parts of Romania") and Despre originea și modul de zăcere a petrolului în general și în particular în Carpați ("On the Origin and Mode of Storage of Petroleum in General and in Particular in the Carpathians"). The first, published at Iași in 1883, introduced the modern study of the Neogene to Romania; first described the bivalve genus Psilodon, later called Prosodacna by Tournouer; and made observations regarding the presence and distribution of hydrocarbons. The second, published at the Romanian Academy in 1887, synthesizes research on petroleum geology as well as introducing original concepts, the result of personal research and an application of extant data on the situation in Romania. He was the first to theorize that petroleum existed in the Wallachian Platform and theorized a connection between petroleum deposits and halite deposits in molasse.

Before the Sarmatian stage of the Miocene was proposed, Cobălcescu, drawing on the fossils at Repedea and the type of water in which they formed, suggested several subdivisions of this stage (Volhynian, upper and lower Bessarabian) and argued that the Moldavian Platform evolved as a carbonate platform, a view still accepted by some researchers. He laid the basis for the scientific museums in the geography and geology faculty, first by setting aside rooms for his personal collections, and then by purchasing some 10,000 rocks and fossils from a German firm, for use in teaching and research. He was elected a titular member of the Romanian Academy in 1886. He died in his laboratory at night while preparing his course for the following day.

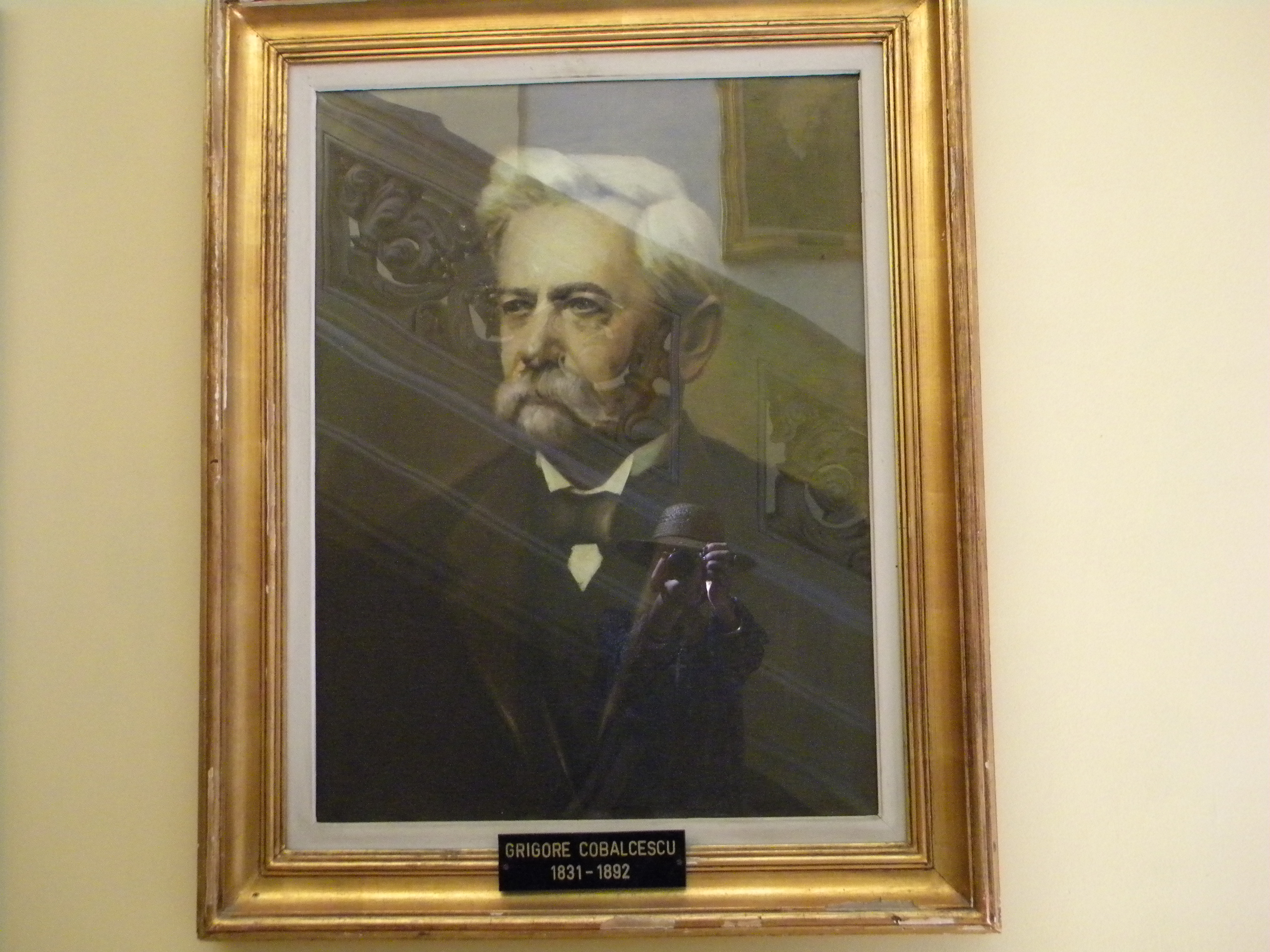
Portrait on display in Bucharest

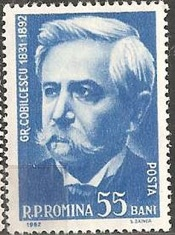
1962 postage stamp

== See also ==
- Cobalescou Island
