= Repedea Hill Fossil Site =

Nature reserve in Moldavia, Romania

Coordinates: 47°05′19″N 27°38′37″E

Repedea Hill Fossil Site (Romanian: Locul fosilifer Dealul Repedea) is a nature reserve located 9 km south of Iași, in the historical region of Moldavia, Romania. Repedea Hill is part of the Iași Ridge (Romanian: Coasta Iașilor), at the contact between the Central Moldavian Plateau and the Jijia Plain.

== History ==
First studies of the zone were in 1862, when Grigore Cobălcescu, professor at the University of Iași, published the "Repedea's Limestone" (Romanian: Calcariul de la Răpidea) research article. These scientific studies, describing the fossil fauna, are considered to be the birth document of the Romanian geology.

In 1953, the perimeter was declared a reserve, being the first geological reserve in Romania. The total area of 44.3 ha consists of the proper scientific area of 5.8 ha (western and north-western slopes of Repedea Hill), and a buffer zone of 38.5 ha.

== Geology ==
The fossils and the limestone discovered in the area were part of the former Paratethys (Sarmatic) Sea. The scientific area includes the limestone walls, the former quarries (oolitic limestone), the caves and an area of the structural plateau. Many Basarabian lithological outcrops are protected within the scientific reserve and contain a rich and important Sarmatian fossil deposit, representative for the Moldavian Platform. The buffer zone is largely located on the Repedea structural plateau, which represents a reversed cuesta.

== Picture gallery ==
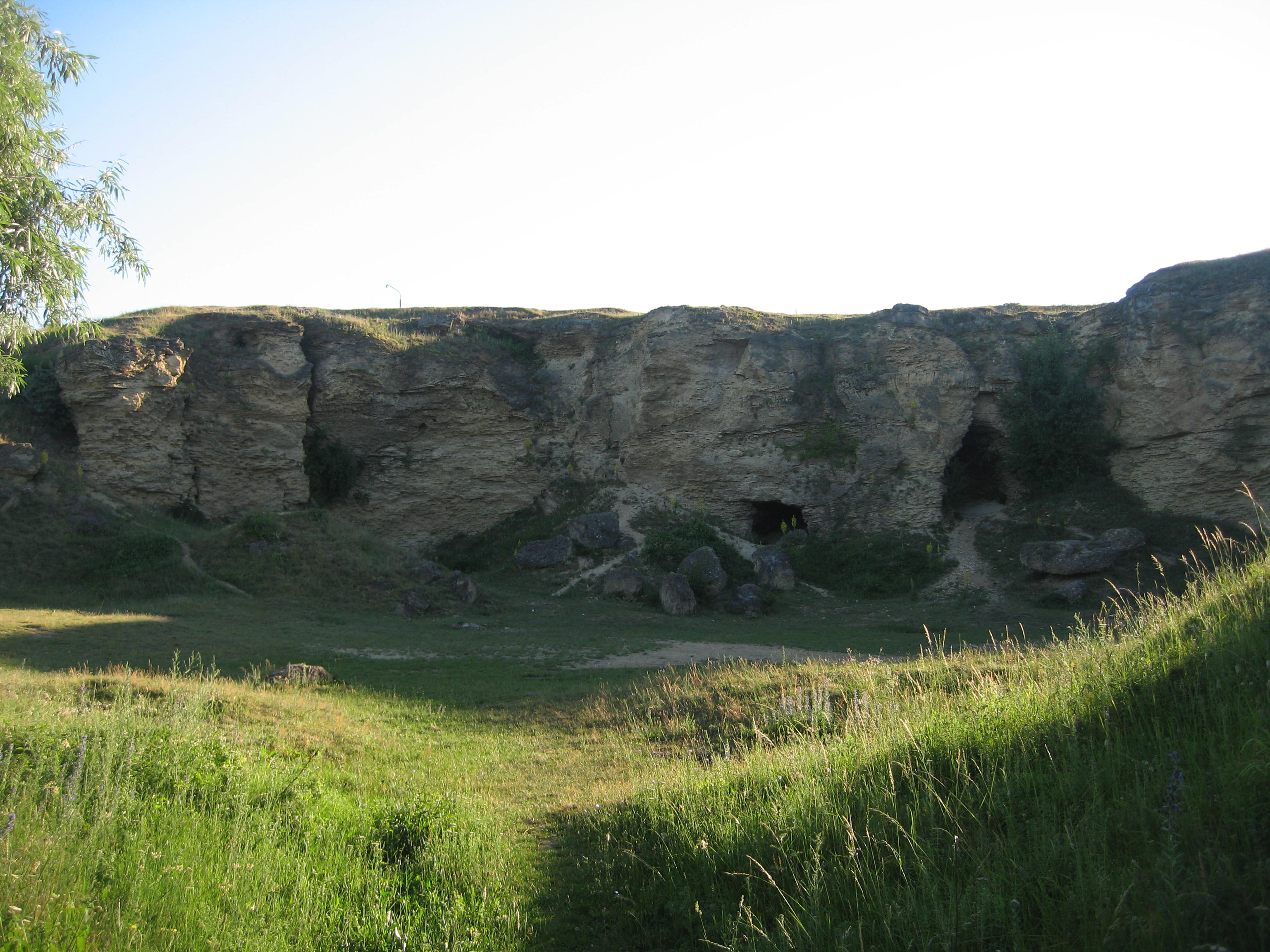

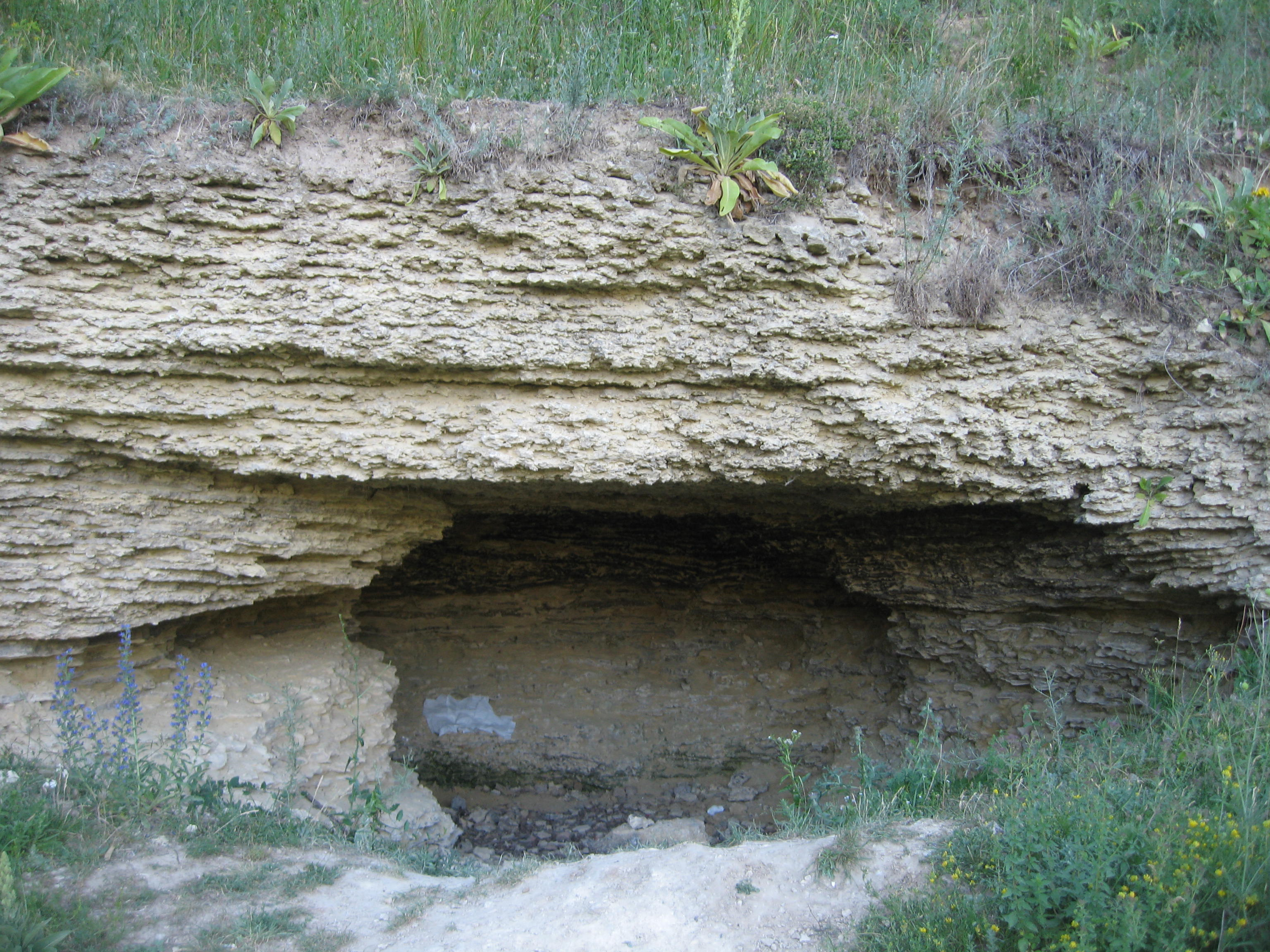

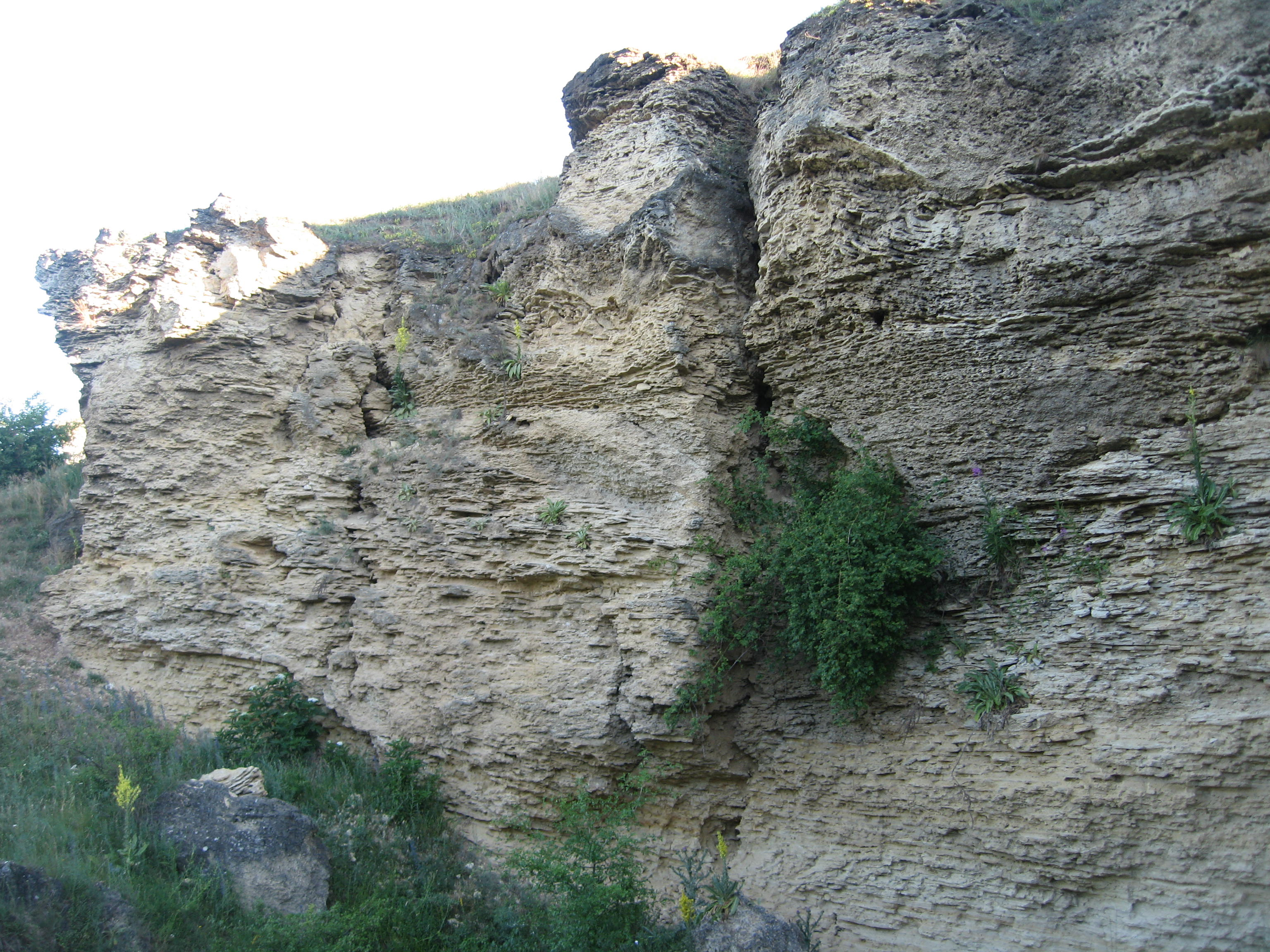

== See also ==
- List of fossiliferous stratigraphic units in Romania
- Seven hills of Iași
