= Seven hills =

Seven hills may refer to:

== Places ==
- Seven Hills, Colorado, US
- Seven Hills, Nevada, US
- Seven Hills, New South Wales, Australia
  - Seven Hills railway station
- Seven Hills, Ohio, US
- Seven Hills, Queensland, Australia
- Seven Hills, U.S. Virgin Islands
- Seven hills of Constantinople
- Seven hills of Shimla
- Seven hills of Iași
- Seven hills of Istanbul
- Seven hills of Moscow
- Seven hills of Rome
- Seven hills of San Francisco
- Seven hills of Seattle

== Other uses ==
- Seven Hills School, a private school in Cincinnati, Ohio, US
- Seven Hills (album), by Anthem

== See also ==
- Seven Mountains (Bergen)
- List of cities claimed to be built on seven hills
- Sevenhill, South Australia, Australia
- All pages with titles beginning with Seven Hills
- All pages with titles containing Seven Hills
