= Podgoria Copou Monastery =

Monastery n Iași, Romania

Coordinates: 47°11′38″N 27°32′53″E

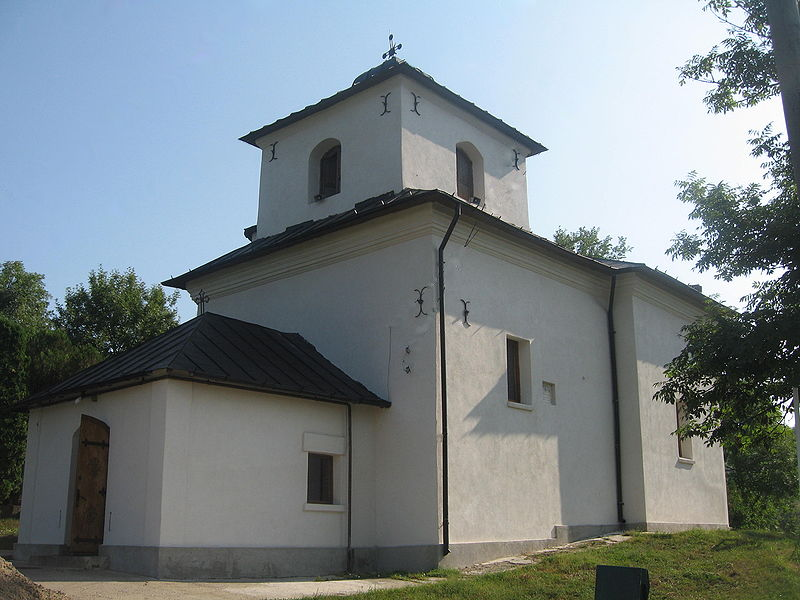

Religion
- Affiliation: Romanian Orthodox Church

Location
- Location: Iași, Romania
- Interactive map of Podgoria Copou Monastery

Architecture
- Completed: 1638
- Materials: brick

The Podgoria Copou Monastery (Romanian: Mănăstirea Podgoria Copou), dedicated to Ss. Athanasius and Cyrill, is a Romanian Orthodox monastery, located on Copou Hill neighborhood in Iași, Romania.

The church of the monastery was built by Moldavian Prince Vasile Lupu.
