= Iași Exhibition Park =

Urban park in Iași, Romania

Exhibition Park
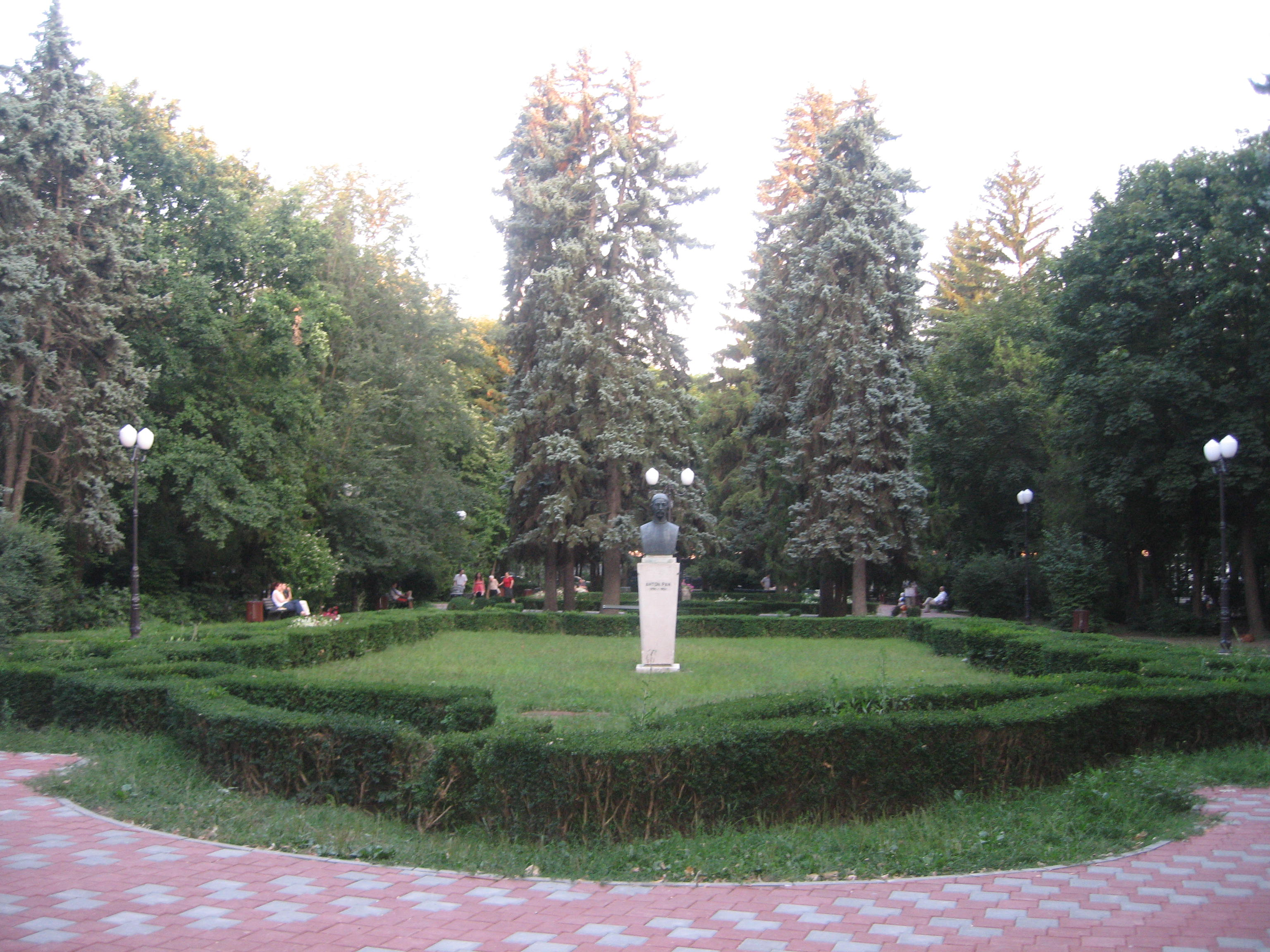
- Type: Urban park
- Location: Iași
- Area: 5.4 ha (13 acres)
- Created: 1923

The Iași Exhibition Park is a park located in the Copou Hill neighborhood, Iași, Romania.

== History ==
Opened in 1923, the park was designed by the architect Nicolae Ghica-Budești and covers an area of 5.4 hectares.

== See also ==
- Botanical Garden of Iași
- Seven hills of Iași
