= Bucium Monastery =

- Mănăstirea Bucium
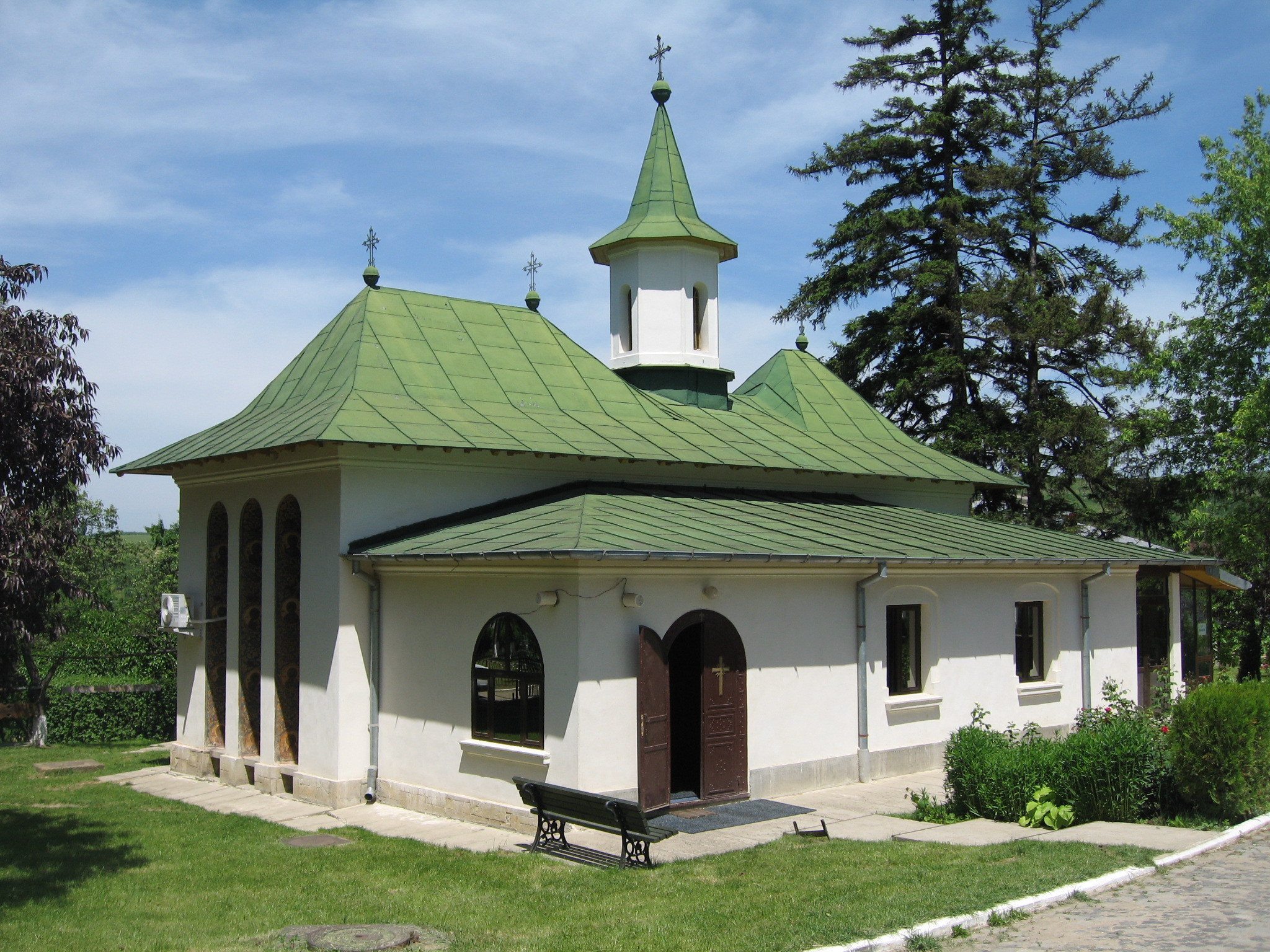
- Bucium Monastery
- 47.1138967°N 27.6390591°E
- Location: 14 Păun Street, Iași
- Country: Romania
- Denomination: Eastern Orthodox

Architecture
- Completed: 1853

Specifications
- Materials: brick

The Bucium Monastery (Romanian: Mănăstirea Bucium), dedicated to "The Sunday of all Aton Saints", is a Romanian Orthodox monastery, located at 14 Păun Street, in the Bucium Hill neighborhood of Iași, Romania.
