= Seven hills of Iași =

Iași, Romania, is claimed to have been built on seven hills. Many other cities of the world have similar traditions, Rome and Constantinople, for instance, were said to have been built on seven hills.

== The hills ==
Each hill is populated with monuments, religious buildings, or parks:

- Cetățuia hill: Cetățuia Monastery (1668), Hlincea Monastery (1587), Frumoasa Monastery (1733);
- Galata hill: Galata Monastery (1582), Nicolina balneotherapy and well-being Centre;
- Copou hill: Podgoria Copou Monastery (1638), Iași Botanical Garden, Copou Park, Exhibition Park, and many monumental buildings;
- Breazu hill;
- Șorogari hill;
- Bucium hill: Bucium Monastery (1853), Bârnova Monastery (1628);
- Repedea hill: the Repedea Hill Fossil Site.

== Gallery ==
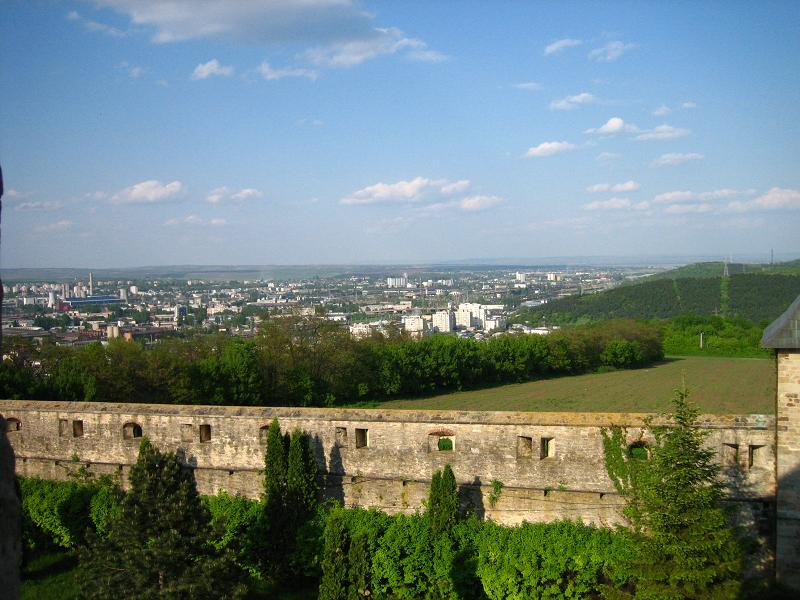
Iași from Cetăţuia Monastery

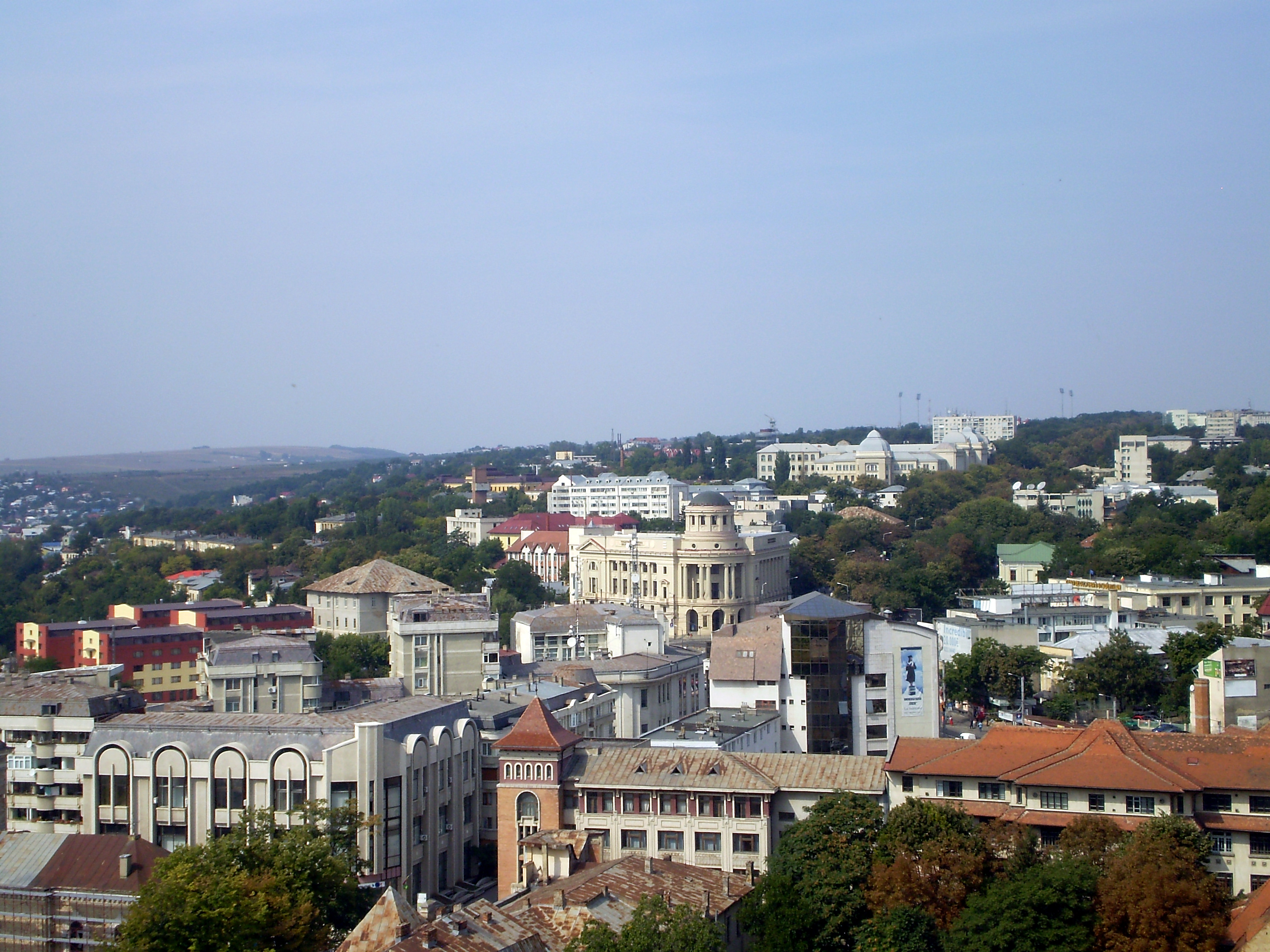
View of the Copou Hill

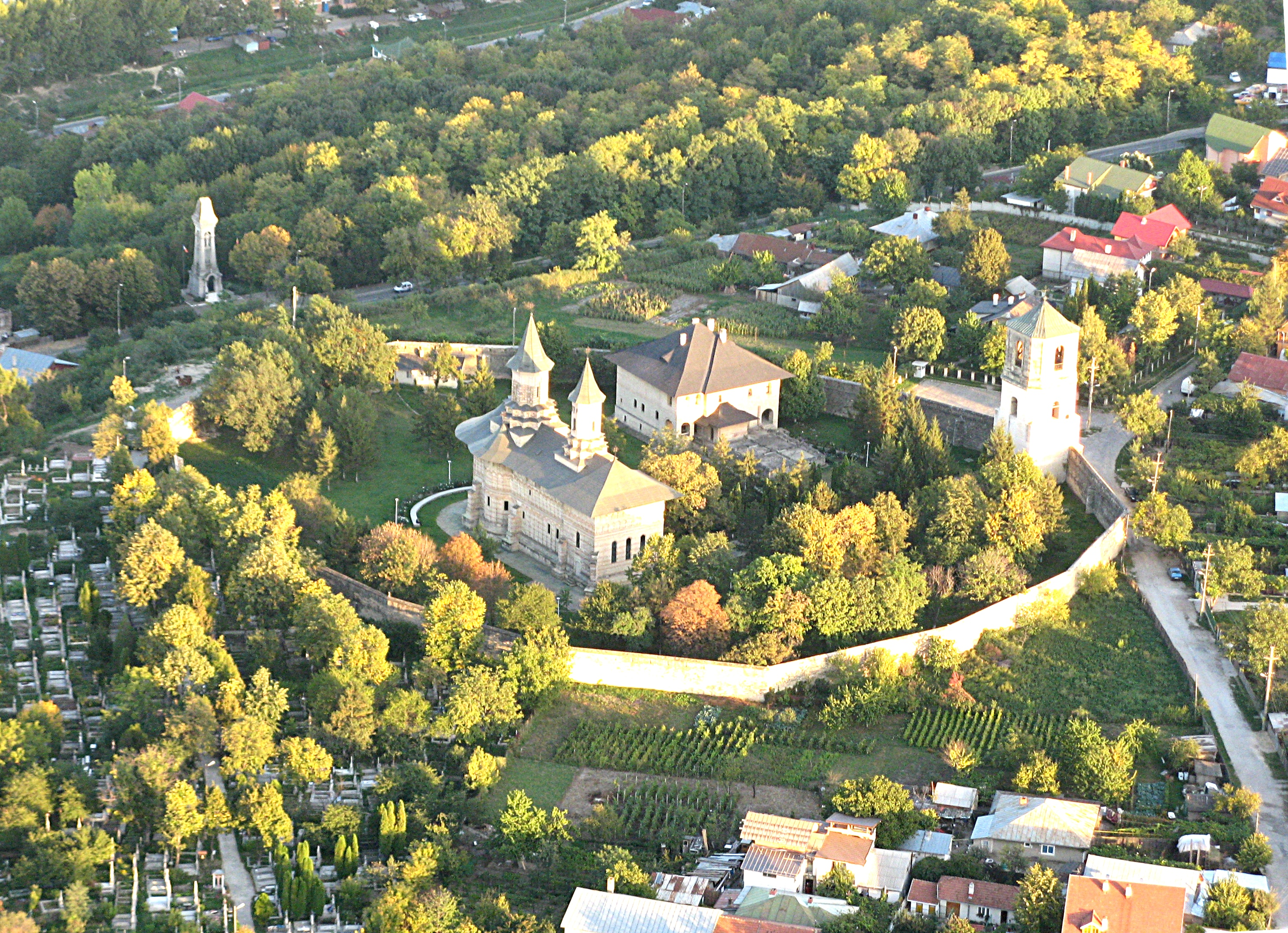
Galata Monastery on Galata Hill

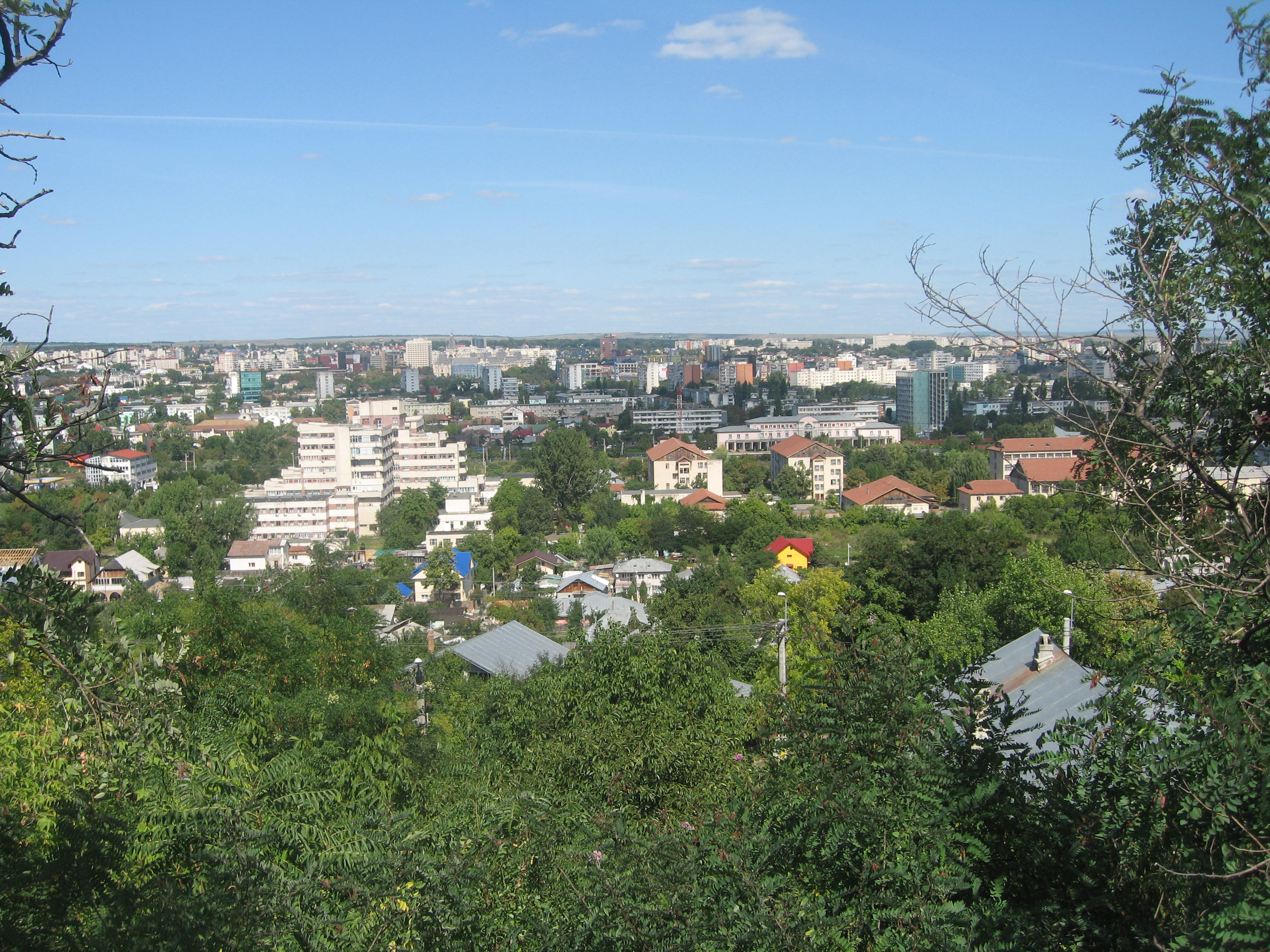
Partial view of Iași from Galata Hill

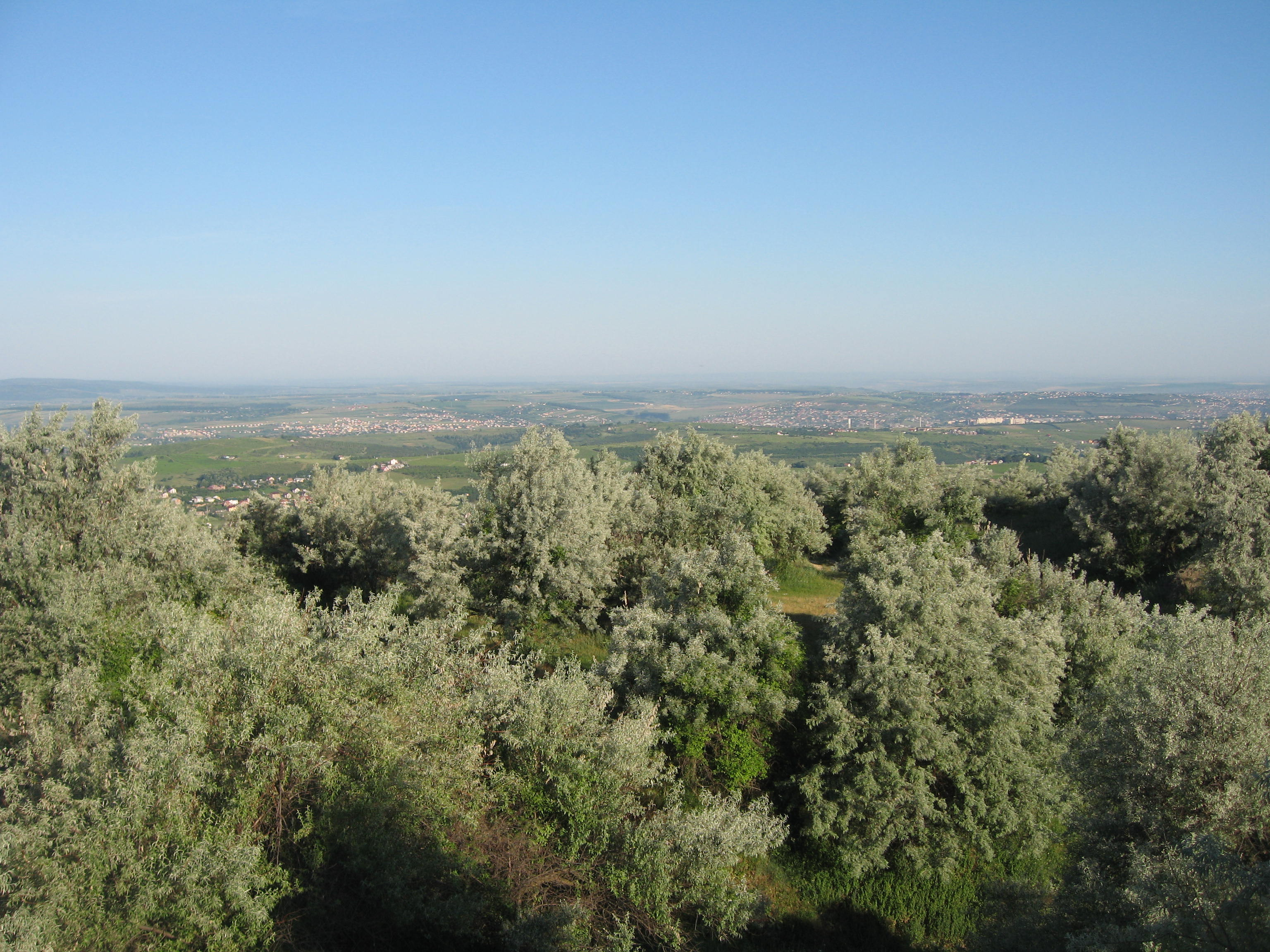
Repedea Hill Fossil Site

== See also ==
- List of cities claimed to be built on seven hills
- Seven hills
