= Seven Mountains (Bergen) =

Mountains surrounding Bergen, Norway

Coordinates: 60°23′54″N 5°20′24″E

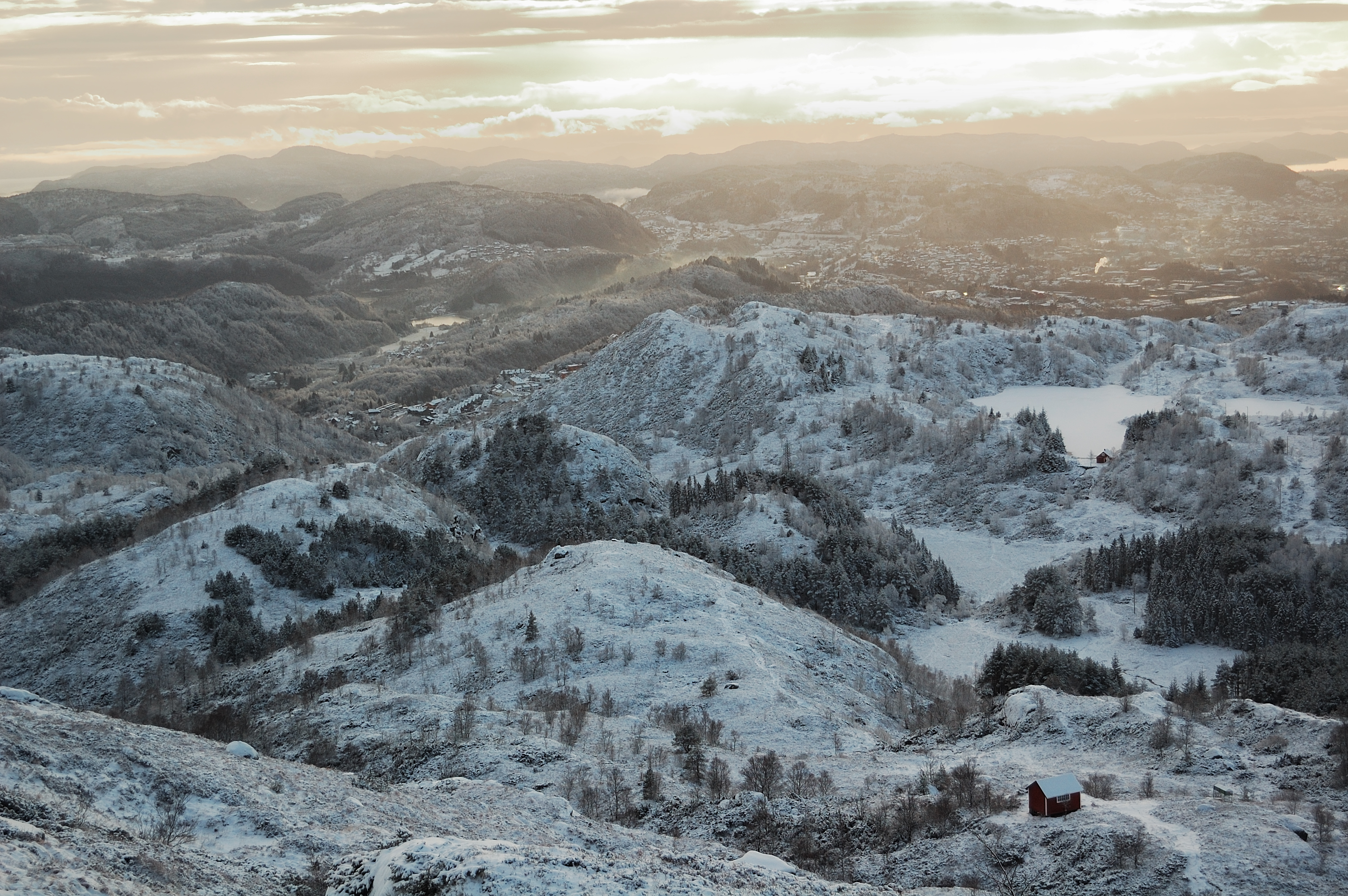
Mountains surrounding Bergen, taken from a path between Ulriken and Landåsfjellet.

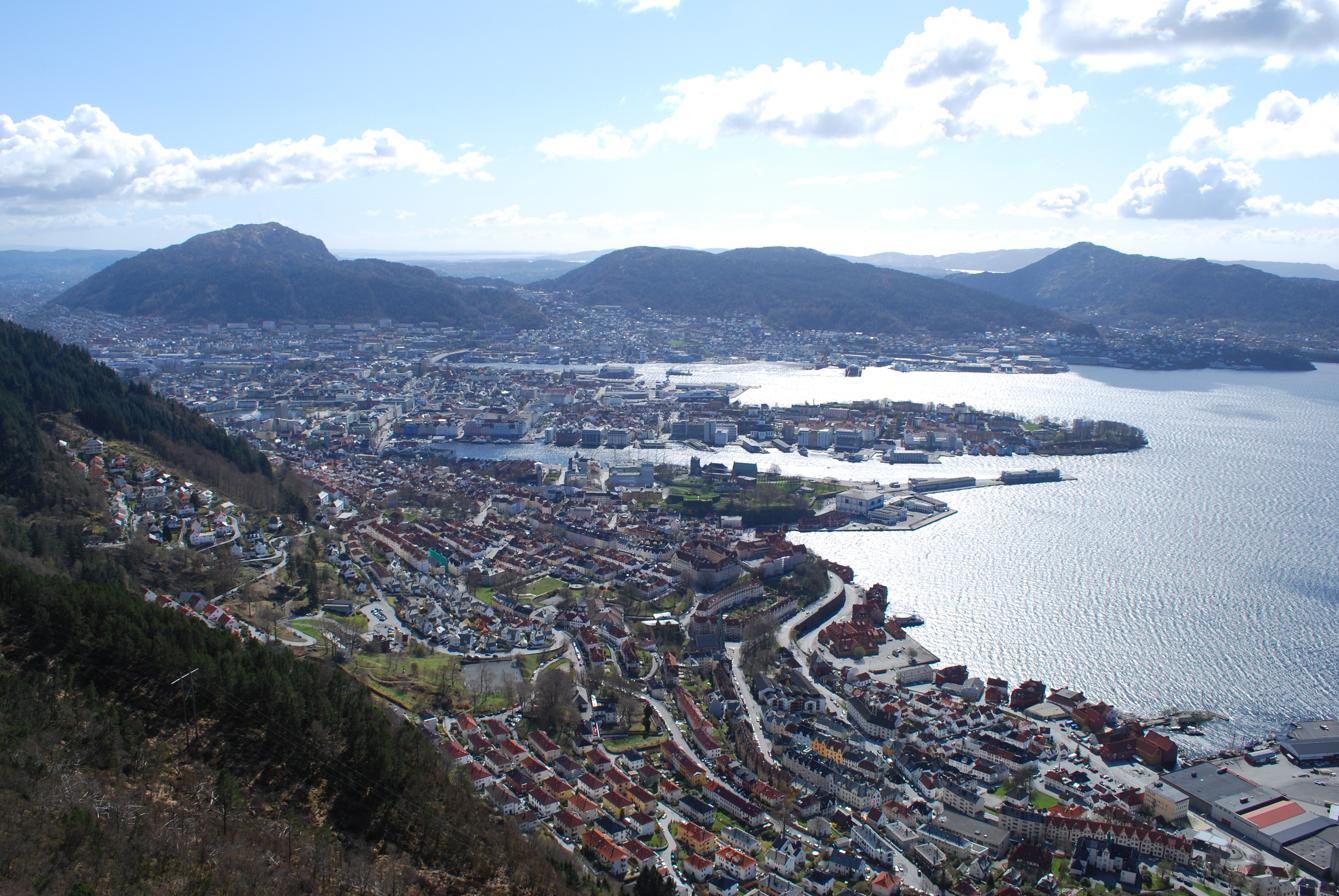
View south from Sandviksfjellet showing part of Bergen and (left to right) Løvstakken, Damsgårdsfjellet, and Lyderhorn.

The Seven Mountains (Norwegian: De syv fjell) are seven mountains that surround the centre of the city of Bergen in Vestland county, Norway. Bergen is often called 'the city between the seven mountains'.

== Selection ==
Playwright Ludvig Holberg (1684–1754) felt so he decided that his home town must also be blessed with a corresponding seven mountains. Which mountains belong to the group is unclear, due to its origin (based on the mythical status of the number seven), and the fact that several of the mountains are part of the same mountain massif.

Since there are many mountains surrounding Bergen, the definition of the "seven mountains" varies depending on who is defining it. The Bergen Mountain Hiking Association, which organizes an annual 7-mountain hike defines it as Ulriken, Løvstakken, Fløyfjellet, Damsgårdsfjellet, Lyderhorn, Rundemannen, and Sandviksfjellet. The list always includes these four main mountains plus three others:

- Ulriken, 643 metres (2,110 ft)
- Løvstakken, 477 metres (1,565 ft)
- Fløyfjellet, 400 metres (1,300 ft)
- Damsgårdsfjellet, 317 metres (1,040 ft)
- plus three from this list:
  - Askøyfjellet, 231 metres (758 ft)
  - Blåmanen, 554 metres (1,818 ft)
  - Lyderhorn, 396 metres (1,299 ft)
  - Rundemanen, 568 metres (1,864 ft)
  - Sandviksfjellet, 417 metres (1,368 ft)

== See also ==
- Seven hills (disambiguation)
- List of cities claimed to be built on seven hills
