= Markovo Tepe =

One of the syenite hills in Plovdiv, Bulgaria

Coordinates: 42°8′29″N 24°44′27″E

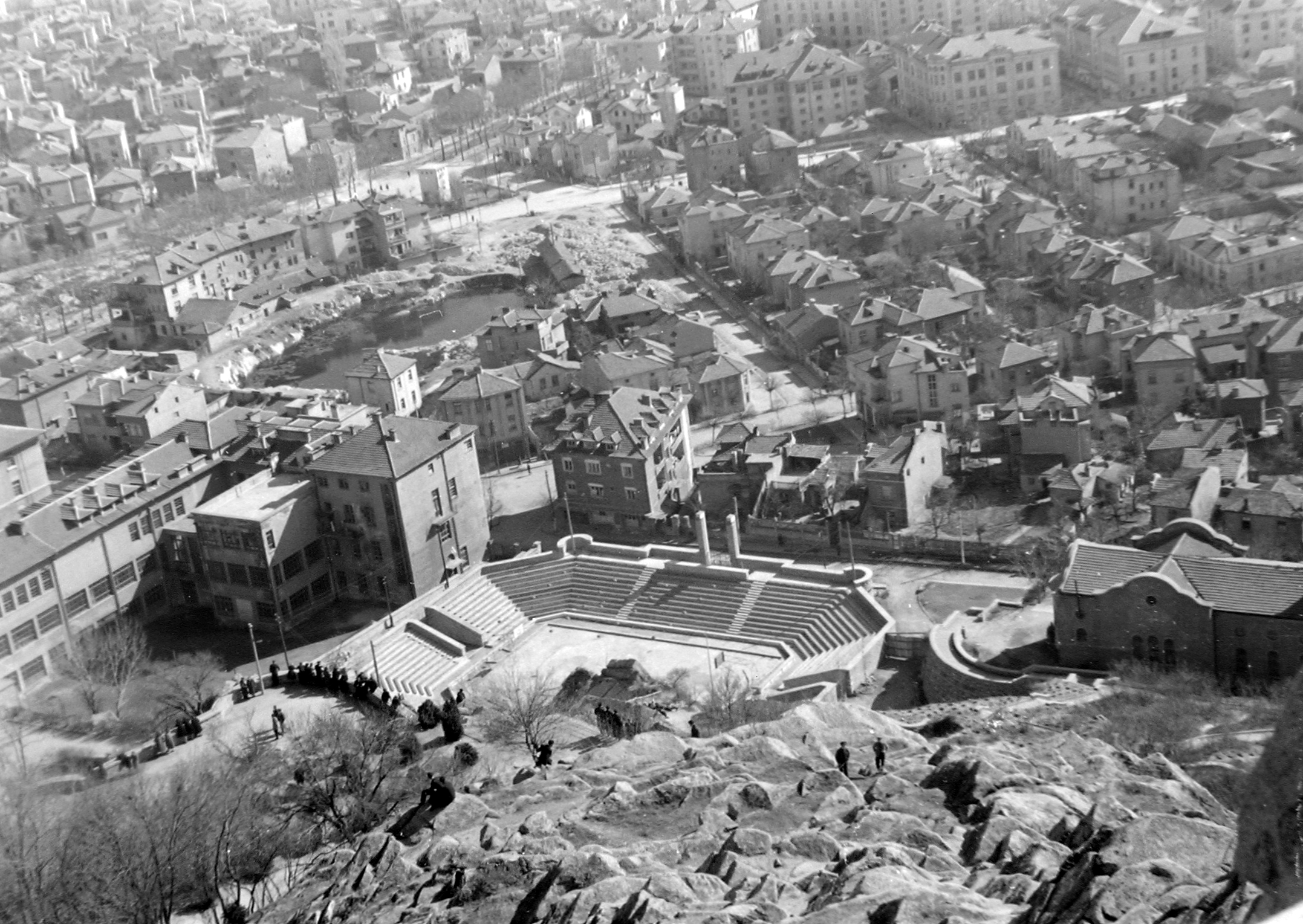
In 1955, there was a huge hole with water on the site of the hill.

Markovo tepe (Bulgarian: Марково тепе) was one of the seven syenite hills of Bulgaria's second largest city, Plovdiv. It was destroyed in the beginning of the 20th century and the material was used for the pavement of most streets in Plovdiv. Currently the site of the hill is occupied by the Markovo Tepe shopping mall, opened in 2016.
