= Kremlin Hill =

Hill in Moscow

Coordinates: 55°44′56″N 37°36′45″E

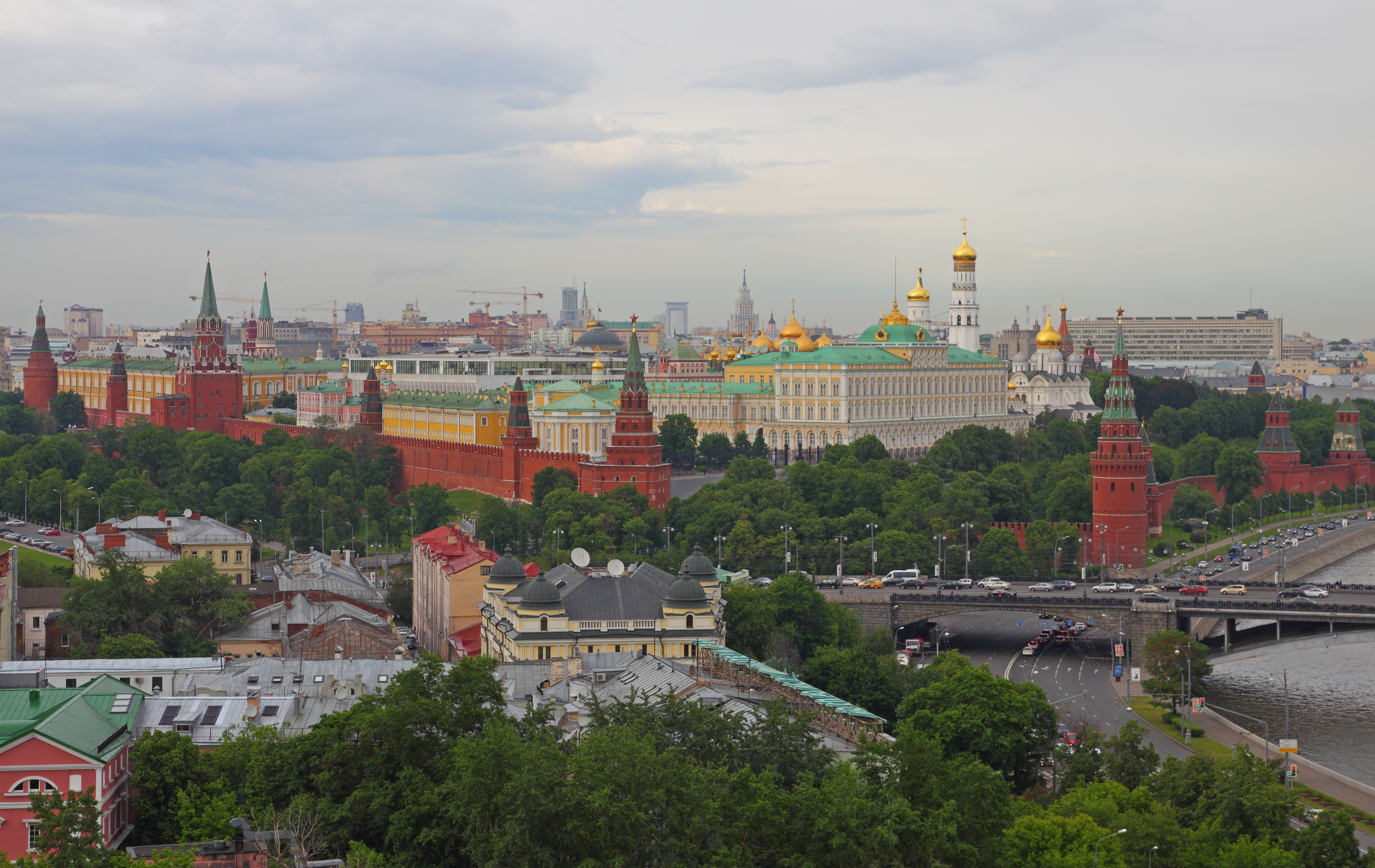
General view of the Kremlin Hill and the Kremlin

Kremlin Hill (Russian: Кремлёвский холм [Kremlyovskiy kholm]; former name Borovitsky Hill – Боровицкий холм [Borovitskiy kholm]; also known as Borovitskiy Cape – Боровицкий мыс [Borovitskiy mys]) is one of the seven hills of Moscow. Altitude up to 145 m. The hill is situated in the city centre, at the confluence of the Moscow River and Neglinnaya River. The Red Square and the upland part of the Kitai-gorod are located on the hill.

== History ==
The Borovitskiy Hill derives its name from the Russian word "бор" (bor) – "pinery". The hill was named so because in ancient times the left bank of the Moscow River was covered with pine forest. Archeologists date the first data on stay of a human being on the Borovitsky hill by the end of the 2nd millennium BC. The following archeologically investigated stage is dated by the 8th–3rd centuries BC. A settlement established here in 11th century became the core of Moscow. In 1156 the first kremlin was built on the hill and it became known as Kremlin Hill. Several gardens have been laid out, some of which belonged to Metropolitan Alexius and Ivan the Terrible.

== See also ==
- Borovitskaya Tower
- Borovitskaya Square
