= Seven hills of Moscow =

Terrain of Moscow, Russia

Seven hills of Moscow

The Seven hills of Moscow (Russian: Семь холмо́в Москвы́) is a historic name of several elevated sections of terrain, on top of which Moscow was built.

The legend of Seven Hills (as an analogy between Moscow and Rome) has been known since the 16th century, when they began to actively develop the hilly terrain dissected by numerous rivers and ravines. Usually, the term Seven Hills refers to the Borovitsky Hill (a.k.a. Kremlin Hill), the so-called Three Mountains (the districts of Presnya and Vagankovo), Tver Hill a.k.a. Strastnaya Gorka (today's Pushkin Square), Sretensky Hill a.k.a. Sukharevsky Hill (today's Sukharevskaya Square), Tagansky Hill a.k.a. Shvivaya Gorka (over the Yauza River), Vvedenskiye Mountains a.k.a. Lefortovo Hill (in Lefortovo), and Vorobyovy Hills.

Besides the aforementioned hills, they sometimes include Krutitsy, Krasniy Hill (over the Yauza River), and Naprudniy Hill a.k.a. Sushchevsky (between the rivers Neglinnaya and Naprudnaya).

== See also ==
- Seven hills of Rome
- Seven hills
