= Blåmanen =

Mountain in Bergen, Norway

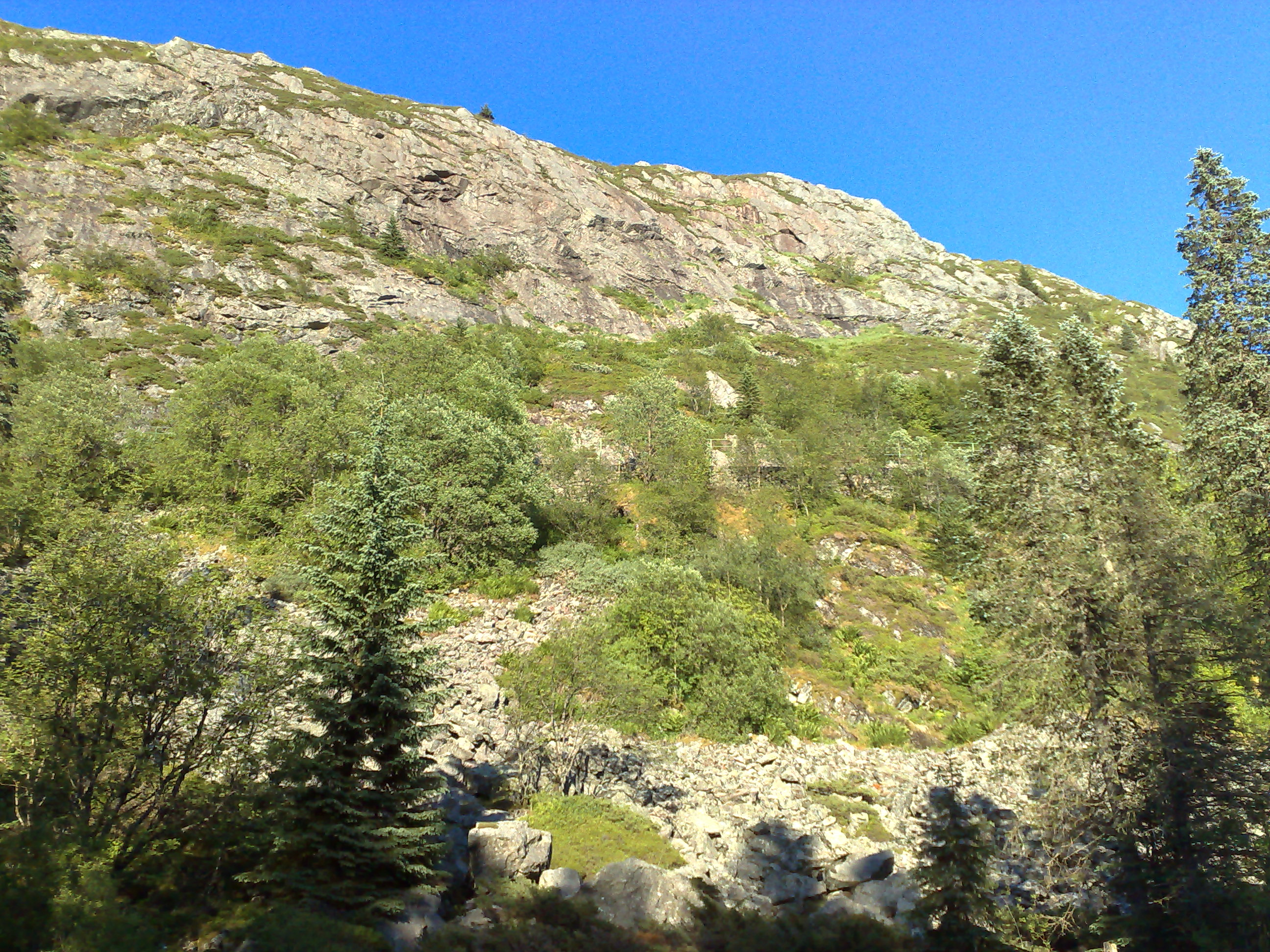

Highest point
- Elevation: 551 m (1,808 ft)
- Prominence: 28 m (92 ft)
- Parent peak: Rundemanen
- Isolation: 1.3 km (0.81 mi)
- Coordinates: 60°24′05″N 5°21′48″E

Geography
- Location: Vestland, Norway

Climbing
- Easiest route: Hiking

Blåmanen is a mountain in Bergen Municipality in Vestland county, Norway. It is one of the seven mountains that surround the centre of the city of Bergen. The 551-metre (1,808 ft) tall mountain is located east of the mountain Fløyen, making it somewhat difficult to see from the city centre of Bergen. The mountain Rundemanen lies just north of Blåmanen.

== See also ==
- List of mountains of Norway
