= Sandviksfjellet =

Mountain in Bergen, Norway

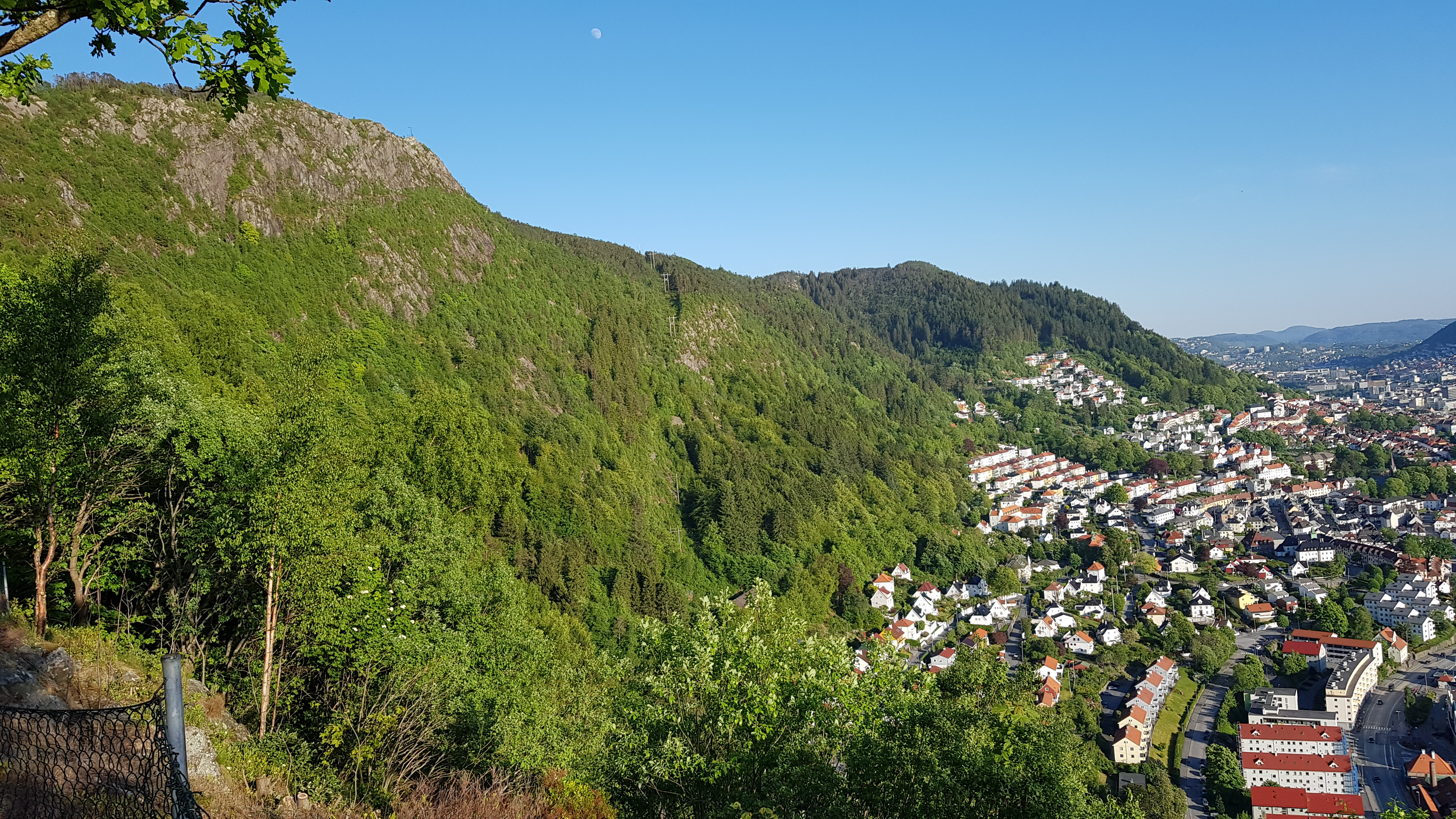

Highest point
- Elevation: 417 m (1,368 ft)
- Prominence: 43 m (141 ft)
- Parent peak: Hauggjelsvarden
- Isolation: 1.1 km (0.68 mi)
- Coordinates: 60°24′34″N 5°20′26″E

Geography
- Location: Vestland, Norway

Climbing
- Easiest route: Hiking

Sandviksfjellet is a mountain in Bergen Municipality in Vestland county, Norway. It is one of the traditional seven mountains that surround the city centre of Bergen. The mountain lies on the east side of the city neighborhood of Sandviken, just north of the mountain Fløyen. The European route E39 highway runs through the mountain as part of the Fløyfjell Tunnel.

The mountain is 417 metres (1,368 ft) high. The hiking route called Stoltzekleiven the path used for a yearly mountain run, where Jon Tvedt holds the record.

== See also ==
- List of mountains of Norway
