= Rundemanen =

Mountain in Bergen, Norway

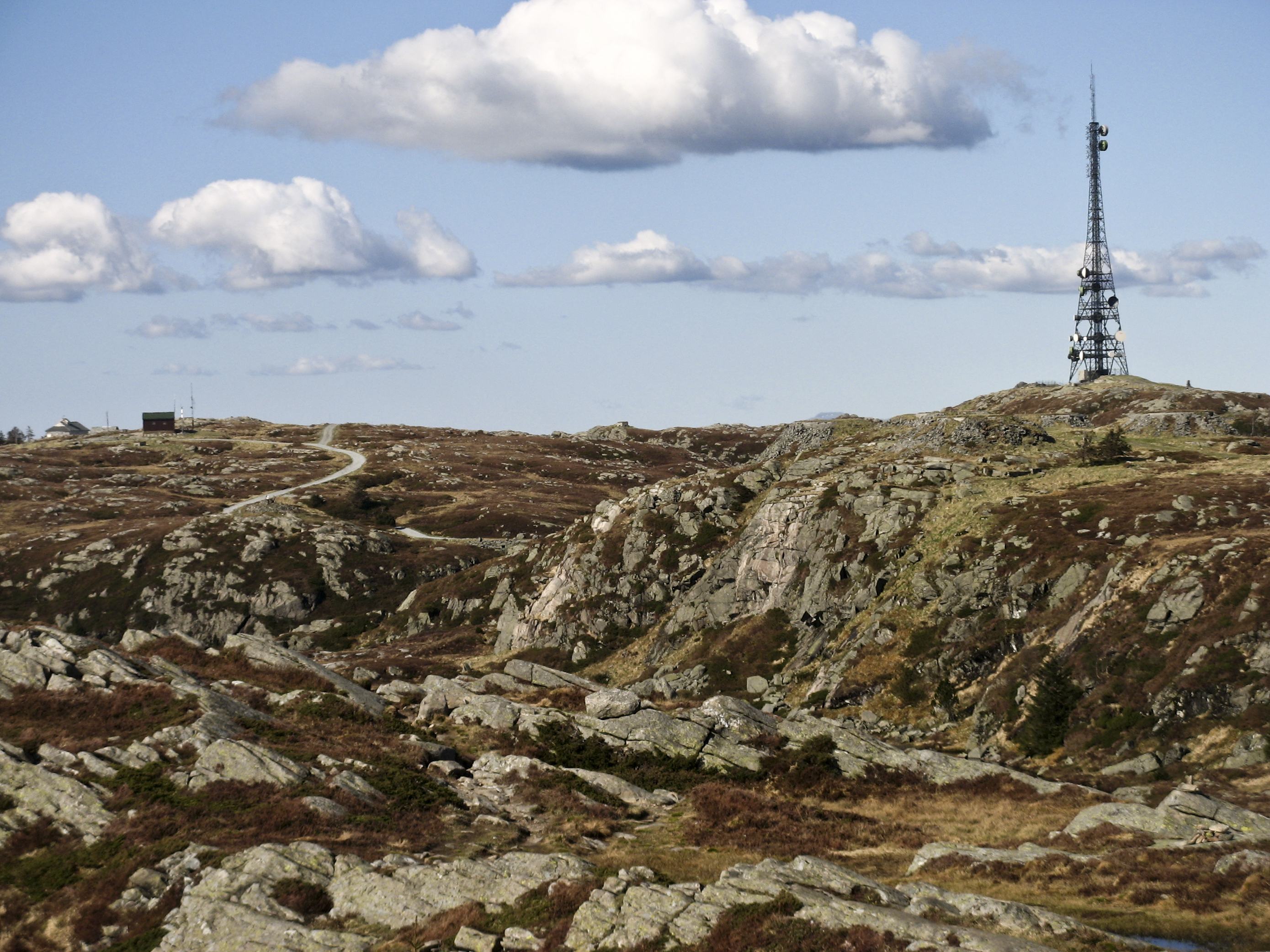
- Top of Rundemanen

Highest point
- Elevation: 568 m (1,864 ft)
- Prominence: 119 m (390 ft)
- Isolation: 0.012 km (0.0075 mi)
- Coordinates: 60°24′40″N 5°21′41″E

Geography
- Location: Vestland, Norway

Climbing
- Easiest route: Hiking

Rundemanen is a mountain in Bergen Municipality in Vestland county, Norway. It is considered one of the Seven Mountains which surround the city centre of Bergen, its elevation of 568 metres (1,864 ft) makes it the second highest of them all. The mountain is a part of the same massif as the neighboring mountains of Fløyen, Blåmanen, and Ulriken, but is not easily visible from the city centre of Bergen since it sits behind Fløyen. Still, Rundemanen's low-difficulty trails that offer scenic views of neighboring mountains and islands west of Bergen make them popular footpaths, only taking about 3-4 hours to traverse from Bergen's city center.

== Bergen radio ==
In 1912, with funding from the Norwegian parliament, the Bergen radio station was constructed on top of Rundemanen. The station housed Norway's first long distance coastal radio, allowing for increased naval safety through direct communication with ships off the coast. In 1927, the station's crew assembled their own shortwave antenna and receiver equipment, becoming the first radio station in Norway to receive a shortwave telegram.

The station was staffed up until 1982, when the lodging facilities that housed the station's staff were demolished. Its official closure came on March 18, 2004, but later regulations in 2011 called for the preservation of the site as a cultural monument of Norway's history of telecommunications.

== See also ==
- List of mountains of Norway
