= Bergen's Electric Tramway =

Heritage tram operator in Bergen, Norway

Coordinates: 60.383611°N 5.321905°E

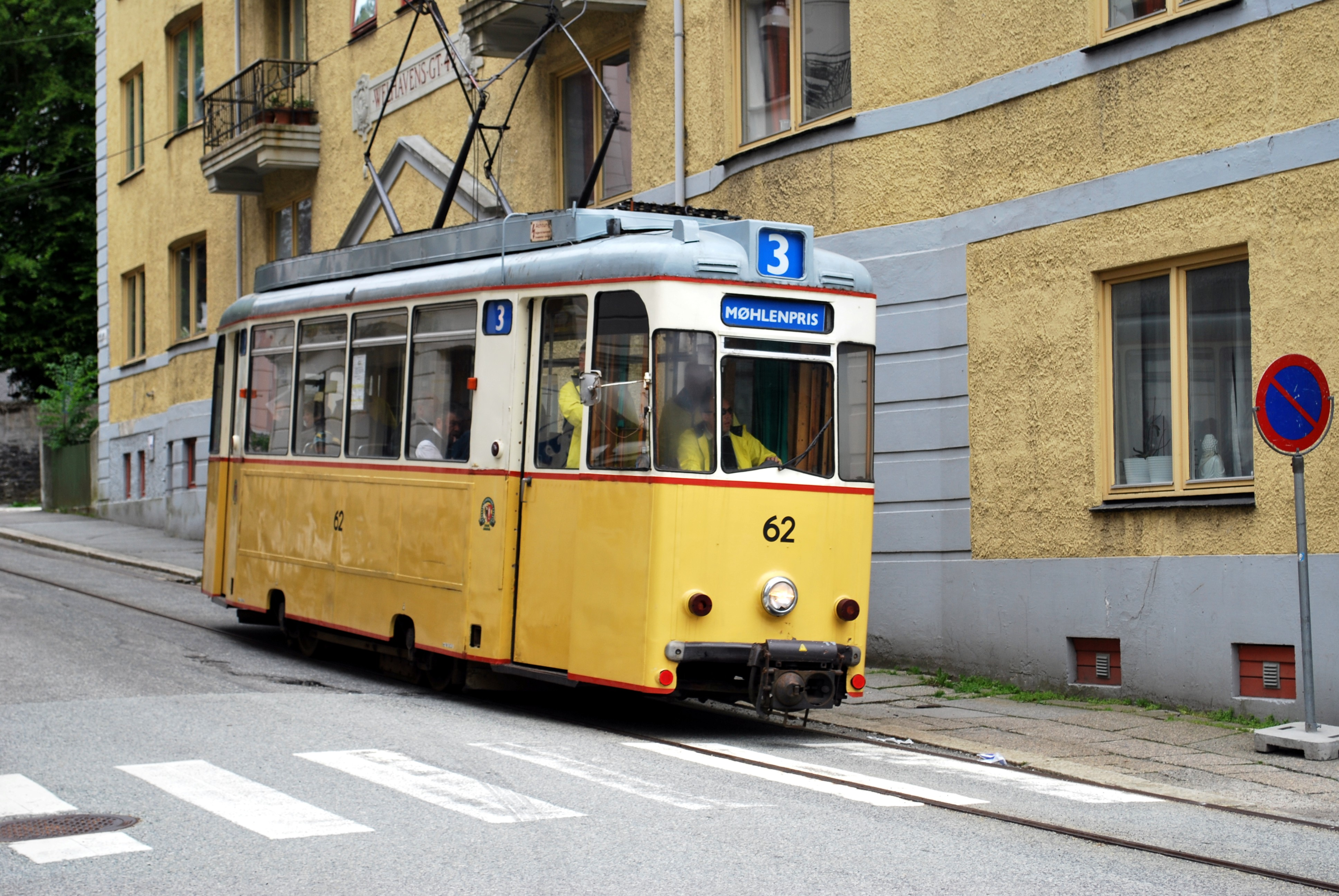
- A former East Berlin tram operating on the Bergen heritage tramway in 2009

Overview
- Locale: Bergen, Norway
- Transit type: Heritage tramway
- Number of lines: 1
- Number of stations: 15

Operation
- Began operation: 1993
- Operator: Bergen's Electric Tramway
- Number of vehicles: 5

Technical
- System length: 300 m (328 yd)
- Track gauge: 1,435 mm (4 ft 8 1/2 in) standard gauge

Bergen's Electric Tramway (Norwegian: Bergens Elektriske Sporvei) is an organization which operates a museum tramway in Møhlenpris in Bergen, Norway. The tramway is an attempt at a revival of the Bergen Tramway, which operated from 1897–1965.

The tramway is based at Bergen Technical Museum. This building has recently been awarded heritage status and a large sum of money has been spent on renovations on the roof.

Although the line is currently only 300 m (980 ft) long, an expansion to Den Nationale Scene is under construction. Further, more ambitious, plans include lines to Bryggen and St Mary's Church, Nordnes and Bergen Aquarium, and VilVite.

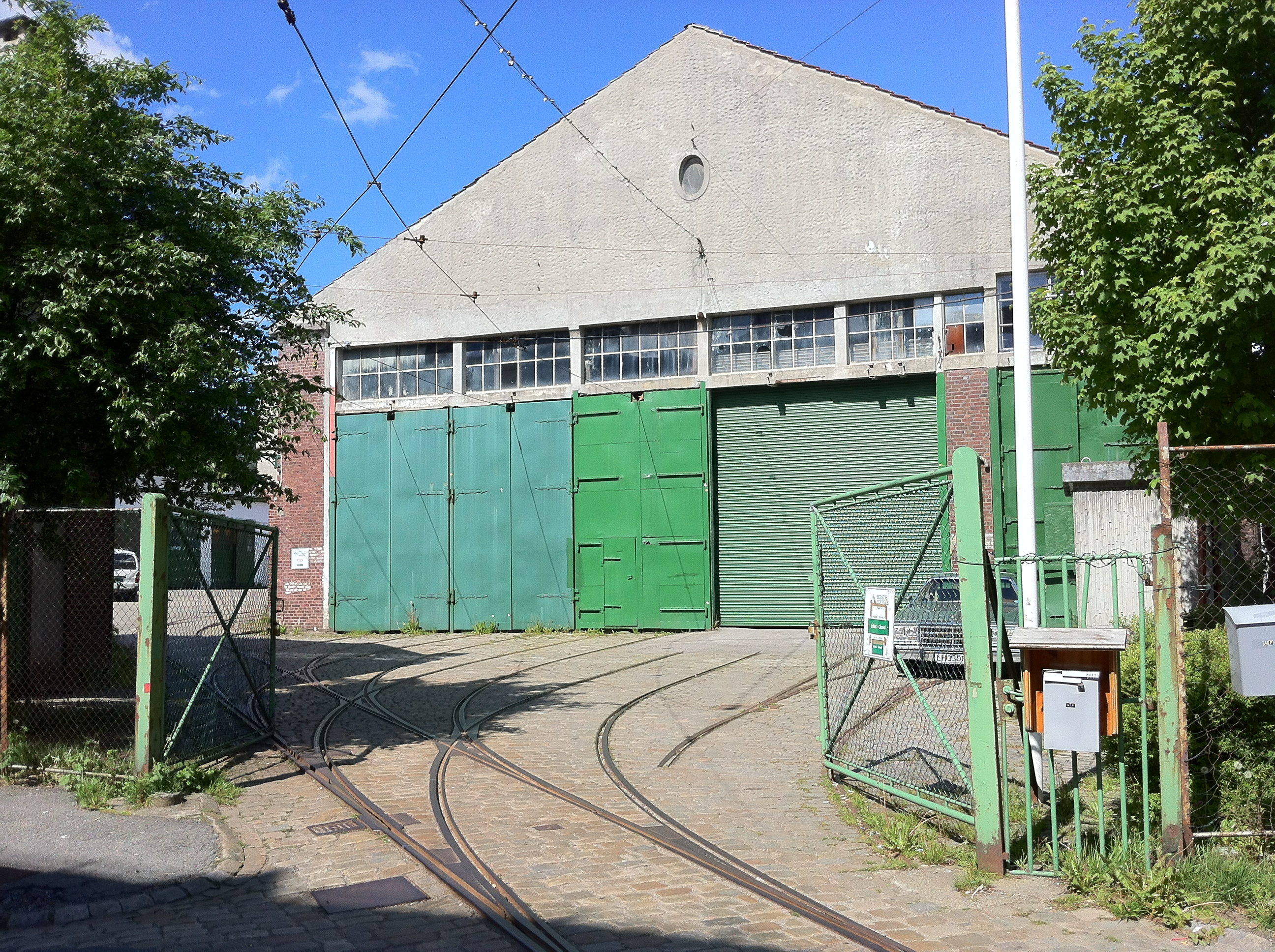
Bergens Tekniske Museum hall in the former tram depot

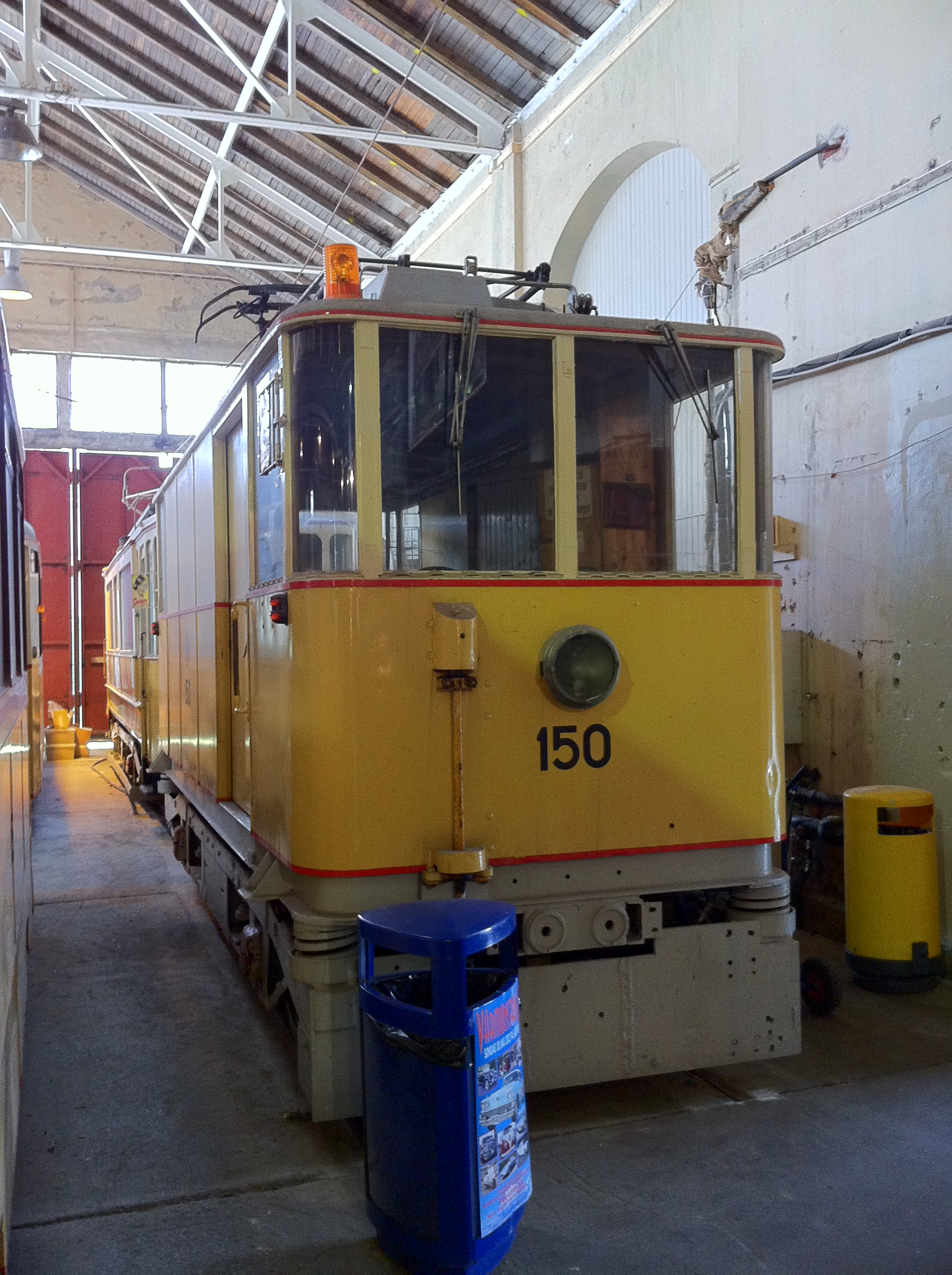
Tram 150 at Bergen Technical Museum

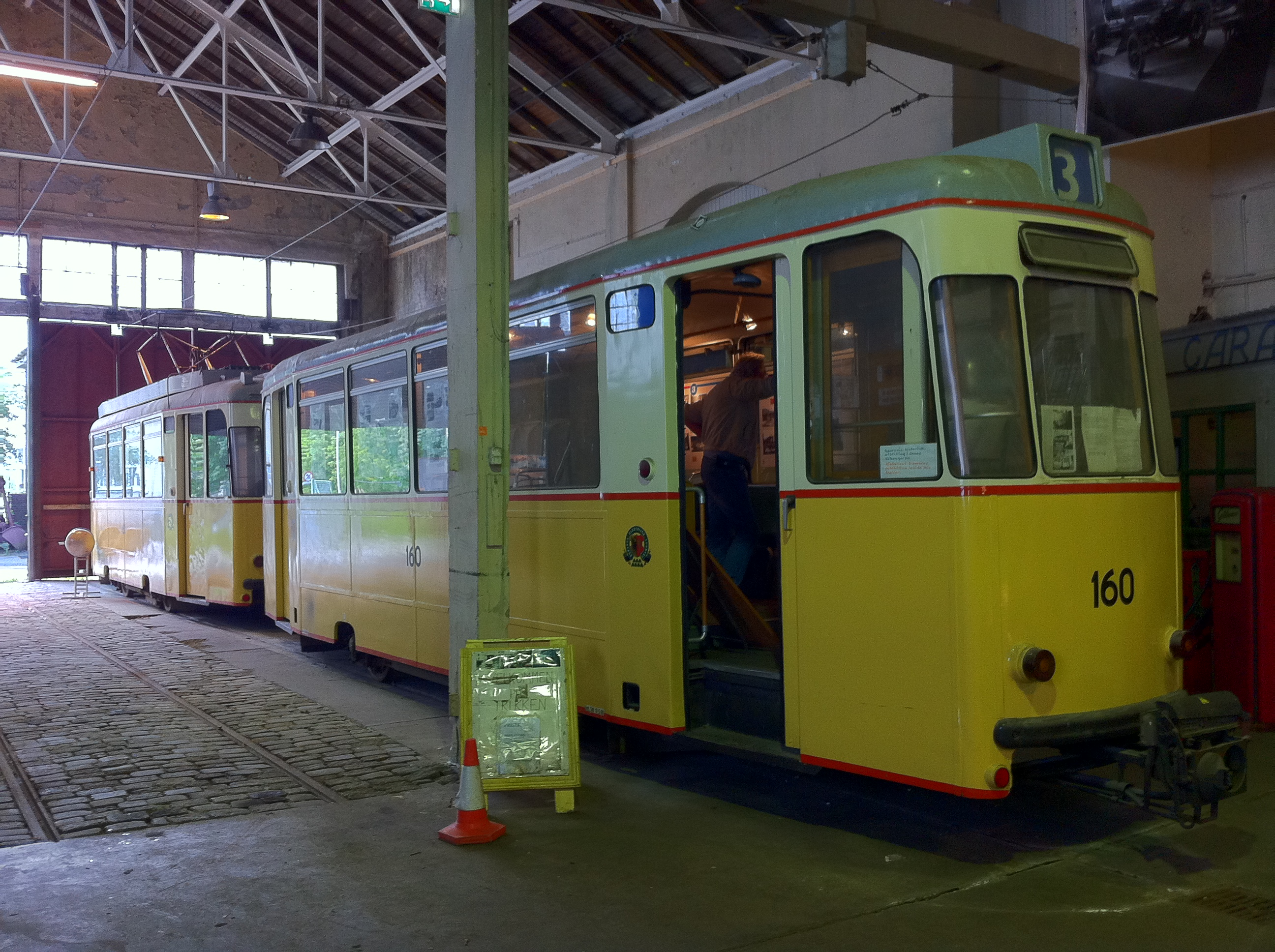
Tram 160 at Bergen Technical Museum

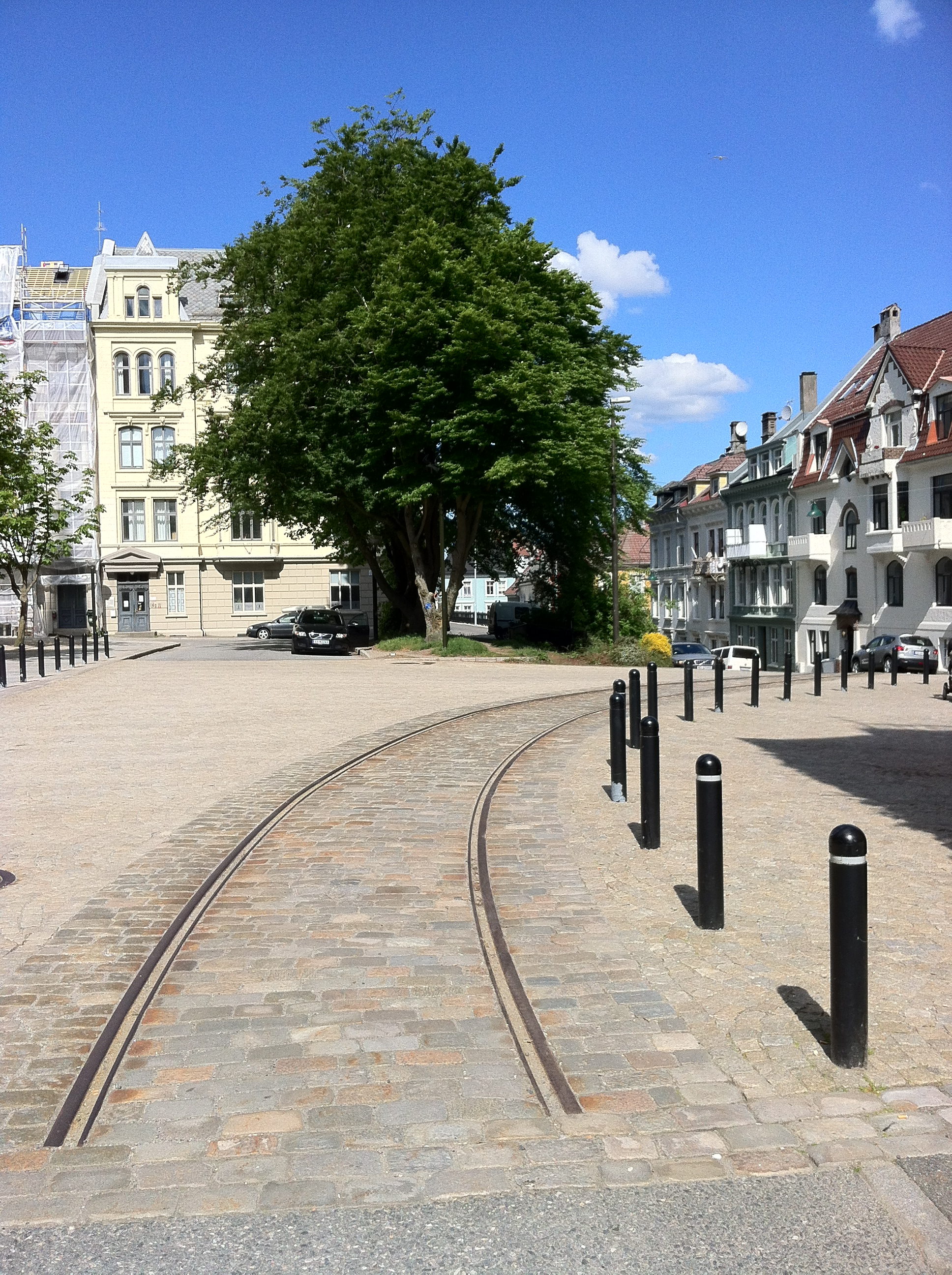
Track laid outside St John's Church on Sydnesplassen

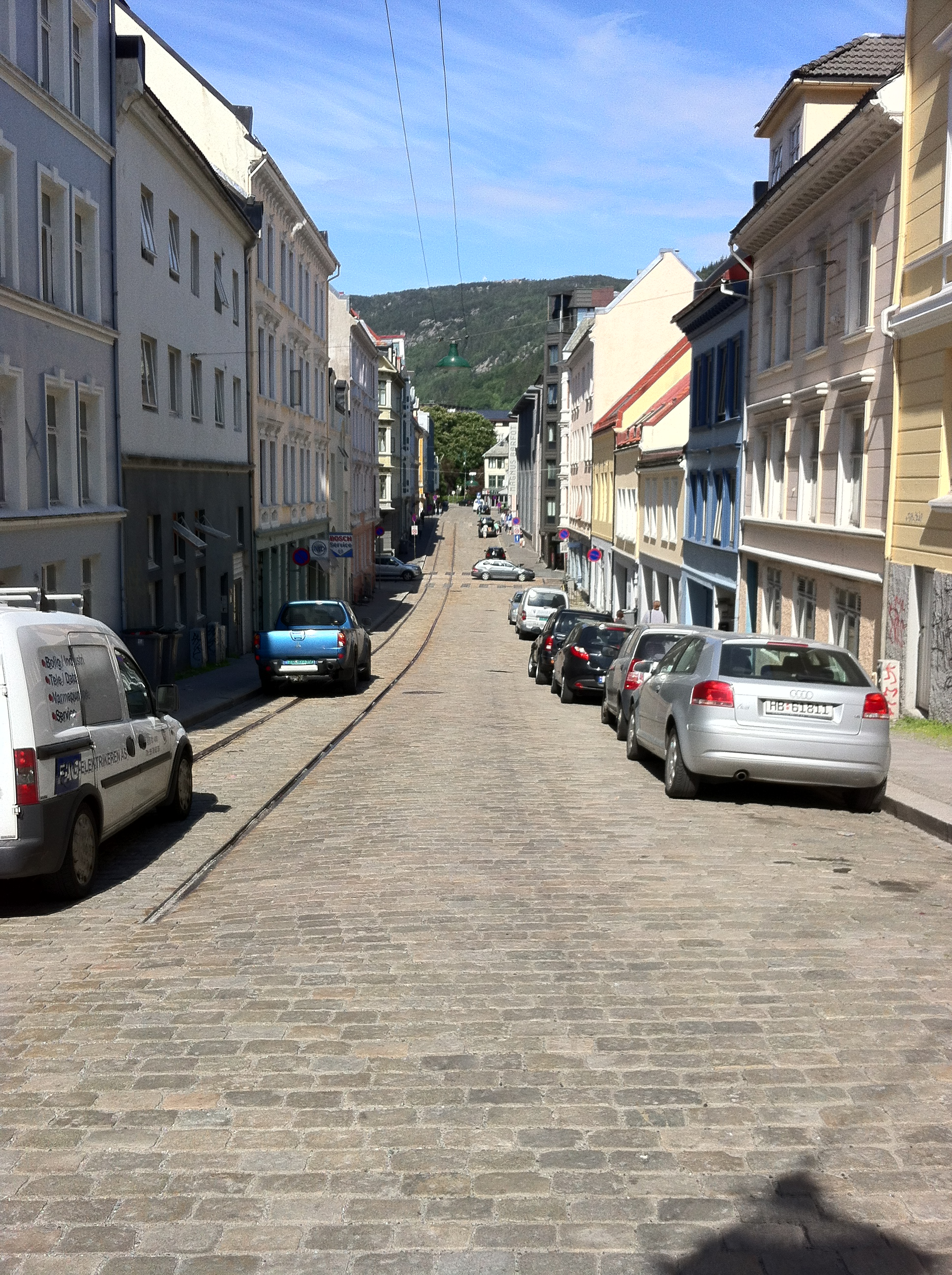
Track laid on Magnus Barfots gate

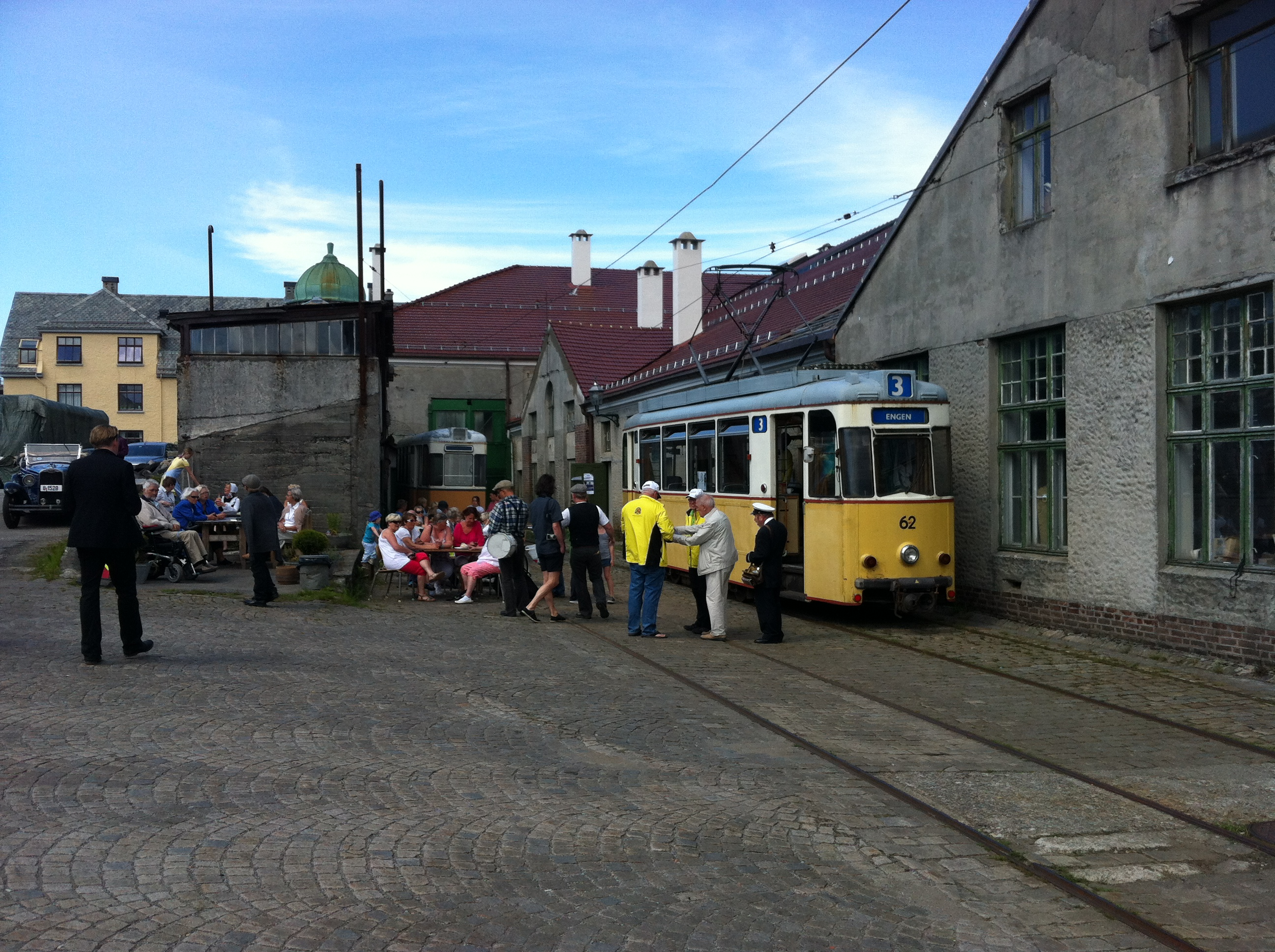
An open day
