= Di2 =

Di2 may refer to:

- NSB Di 2, a class of locomotives in Norway
- Shimano Di2, an electronic shifting system for bicycles
- Dead Island 2, a 2023 video game
