= Nordnes Park =

Public park in Bergen, Norway

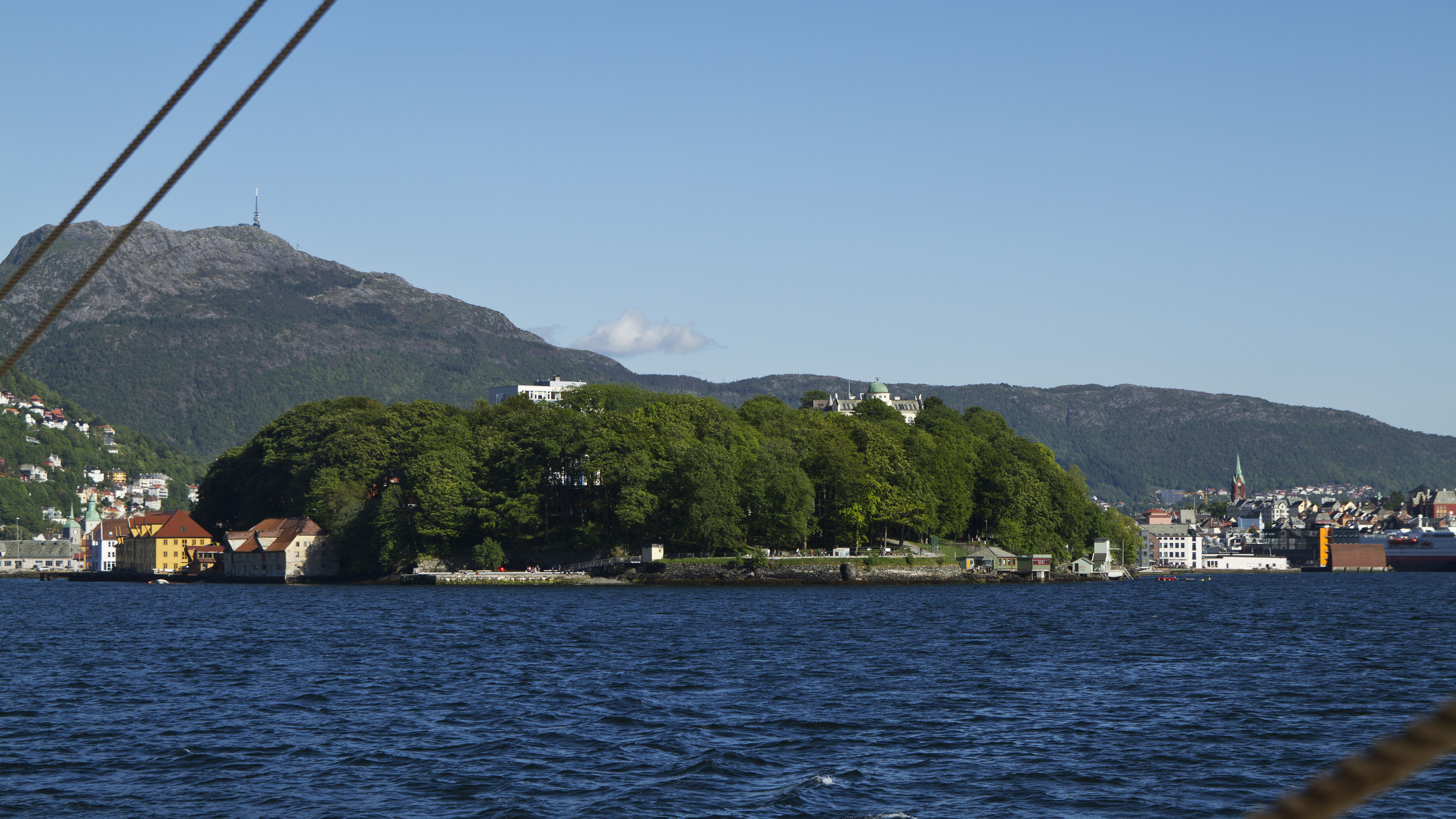
- Interactive map of Nordnes Park
- Location: Bergen, Norway
- Coordinates: 60.39758°N 5.30782°E
- Area: 37.7 decares (9.3 acres)
- Opened: 1888-1898
- Status: Open year round

The Nordnes Park (Norwegian: Nordnesparken) is a public park in Bergen Municipality in Vestland county, Norway. The park is located near the centre of the city of Bergen on the northwestern end of the Nordnes peninsula. It was established in 1888-1898 after an initiative from Edvard G. Johannessen in Det nyttige Selskab. The park covers about 32.7 decares (8.1 acres) of land.

The Bergen Aquarium and the headquarters of the Norwegian Institute of Marine Research are both located next to the park.

The city of Bergen and the city of Seattle are sister cities, and in 1970, Seattle sent a totem pole to Bergen to celebrate the city's 900th anniversary. The totem pole was erected in the Nordnes Park.

== Nordnes Sjøbad ==
Nordnes Sjøbad is situated in the park. Nordnes Sjøbad is a heated saltwater swimming pool, just a short walk from the city centre. One can also take a refreshing dip in the sea. The facilities include indoor changing rooms and a sauna.

== Gallery ==
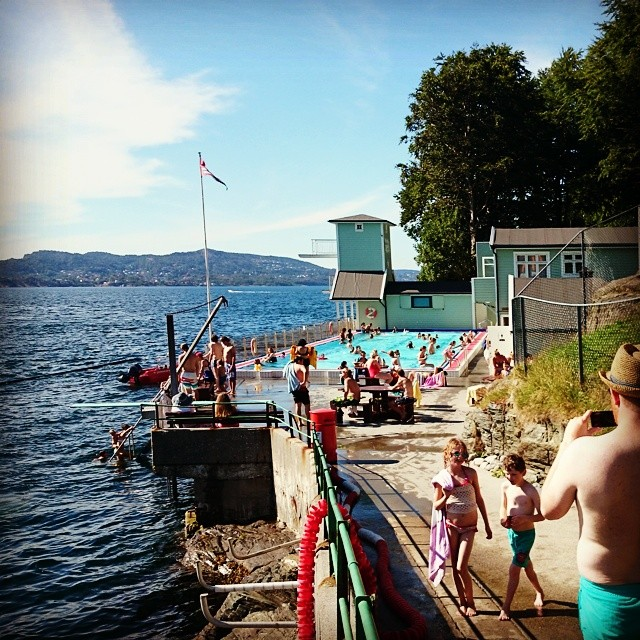
Nordens Sjøbad in July 2014

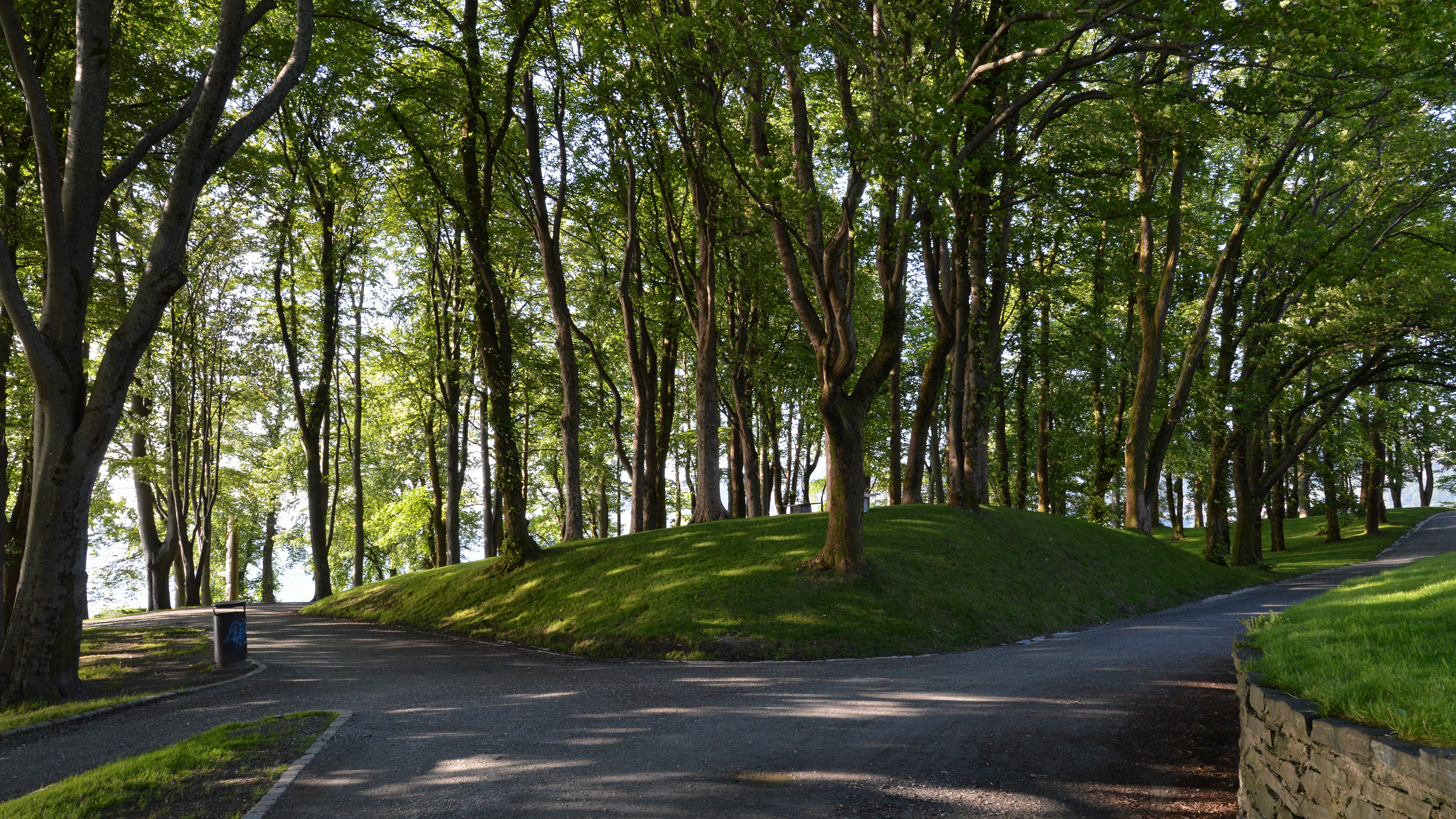
Nordnesparken in July 2021

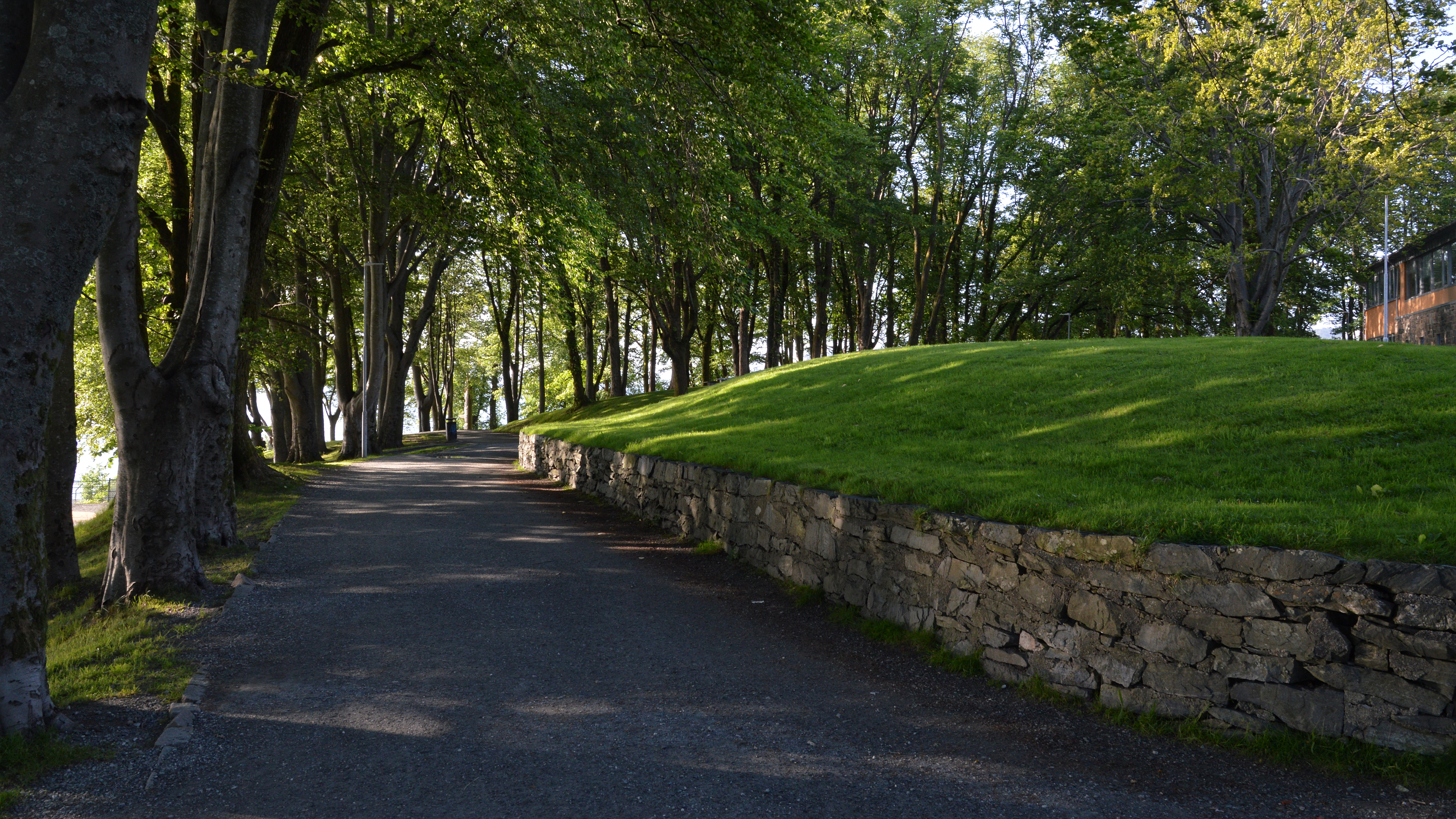
