= Bergen Technical Museum =

Museum in Bergen, Norway

Coordinates: 60.38378°N 5.32118°E

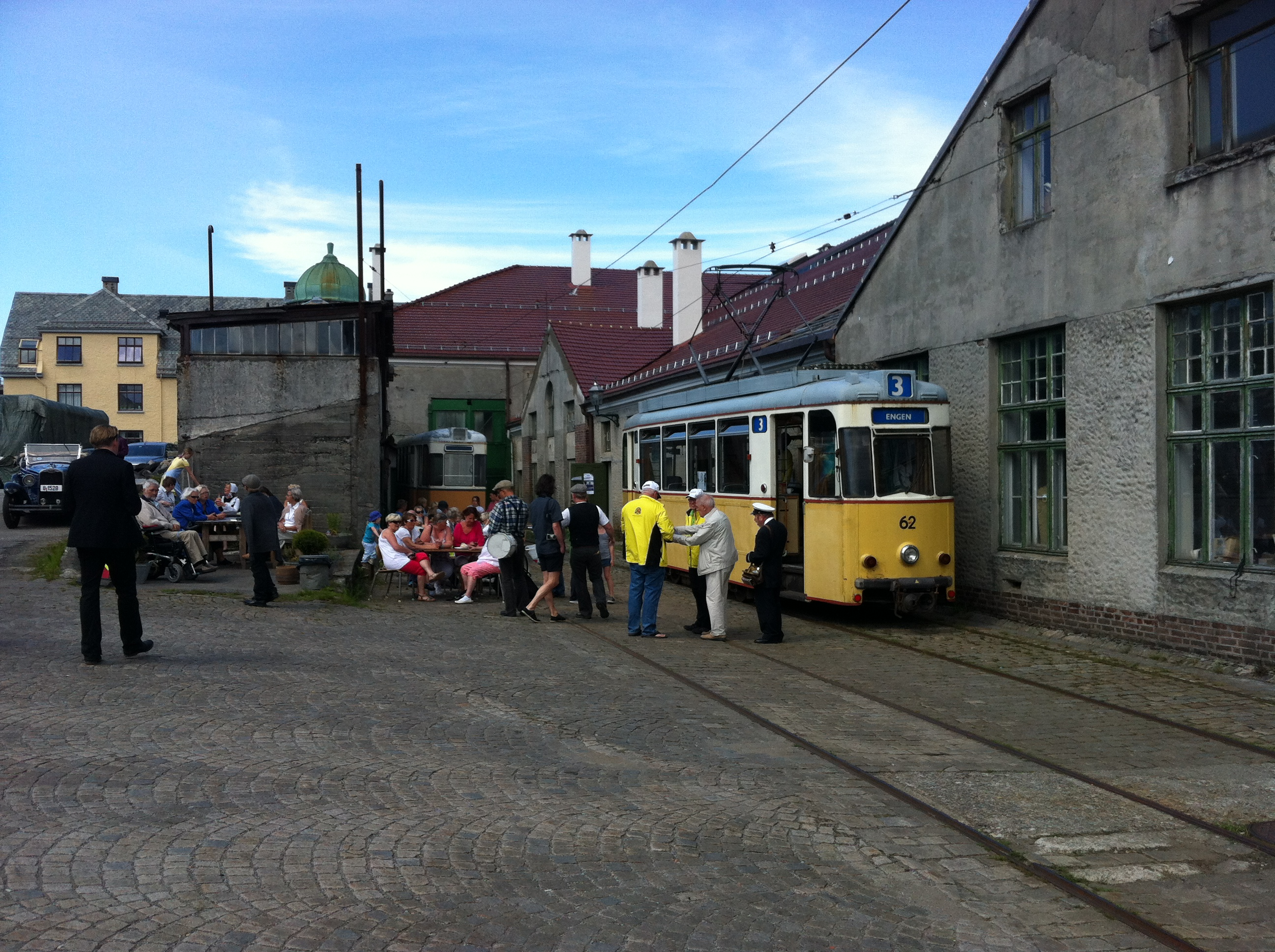
Open day at the museum, including two heritage trams of Bergen's Electric Tramway

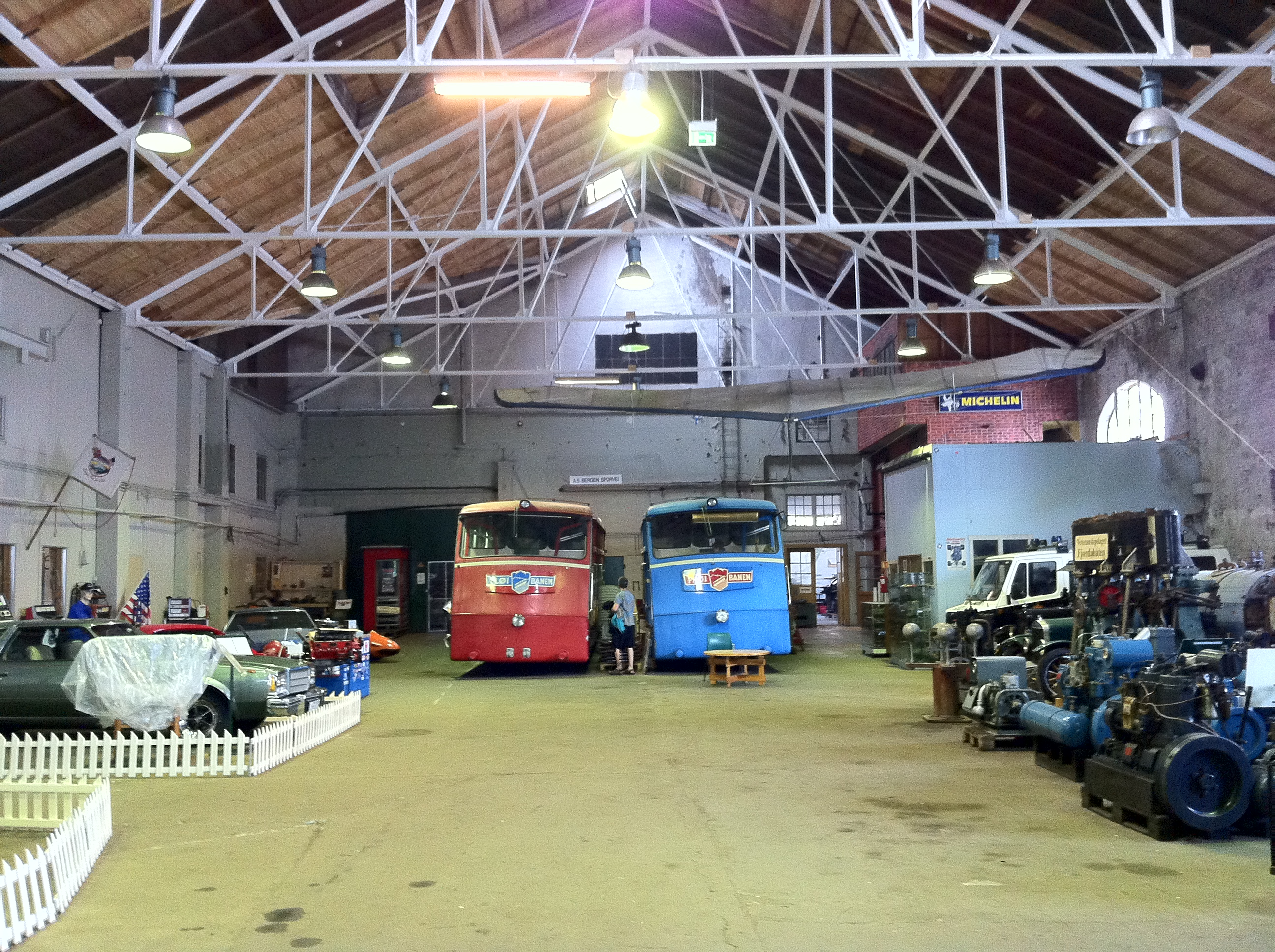
Interior view including two of the funicular trams from Fløibanen

Bergen Technical Museum (Norwegian: Bergens Tekniske Museum) is a technical museum located at Møhlenpris in Bergen, Norway. It is owned and run by various local membership groups with each their own specialized collections, which is collectively displayed in an old tram depot.

The museum is the starting place and acts as a depot for Bergen's Electric Tramway, which runs a heritage tramway service. The collections also include the two old funicular cars from Fløibanen and one of four preserved NSB Di 2 locomotives.
