= NSB Di 1 =

Class of Norwegian diesel-hydraulic locomotives

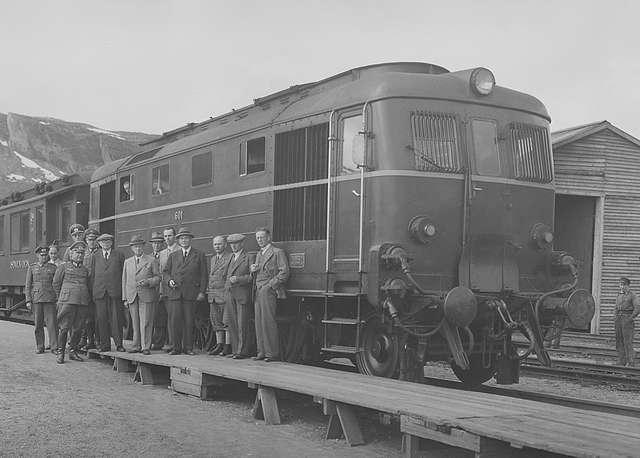
- NSB Di 1 no. 601 in 1942
Type and origin
- Power type: Diesel-hydraulic
- Builder: Krupp
- Build date: 1942
Specifications
- Configuration
  - UIC: 1'BB'1
- Length: 13.5 m (44 ft 3 in)
- Loco weight: 82.7 t (81.4 long tons; 91.2 short tons)
Performance figures
- Maximum speed: 100 km/h (62 mph)
- Power output: 1,472 kW (1,974 hp)
Career
- Operators: Norwegian State Railways
- Number in class: 1
- Numbers: 1 601
- First run: 1942
- Withdrawn: 1959
- Disposition: Scrapped

NSB Di 1 was a class of diesel-hydraulic locomotives built by Krupp for the Norwegian State Railways (NSB). The locomotive had two MAN diesel engines, giving a combined power output of 1,472 kilowatts (1,974 hp) and allowing the 82.7 tonnes (81.4 long tons; 91.2 short tons) vehicle to reach a maximum speed of 100 km/h (62 mph). It had a 1'BB'1 wheel arrangement and a driver's cab at only one end.

Two units were ordered in 1937, but only one locomotive was delivered, in 1942. Numbered 601, it was the first diesel locomotive used by NSB. It first served on the Bergen Line, although the locomotive was plagued with technical faults causing it to be out of service for shorter and longer periods. The locomotive was moved to the Dovre Line from 1952 and finally to the Gjøvik Line and Kongsvinger Line from 1957. The locomotive was retired and scrapped in 1959.

== History ==
The Di 1 was the first class of diesel locomotives ordered by the Norwegian State Railways. Krupp had developed the diesel-hydraulic transmission system during the early 1930s, which at the time proved superior to the diesel-electric transmission system. NSB ordered two locomotives in 1937 to test out the new technology. However, the deliveries were delayed and in the end only one locomotive was delivered, in 1942. The locomotive was designed to be operated in pairs, and thus only received a cab at one end. As only one unit was delivered, the locomotive was in need of turntables to operate. The locomotive was numbered 601, allowing for ample additional steam locomotives to be delivered in the remaining, lower-numbered slots.

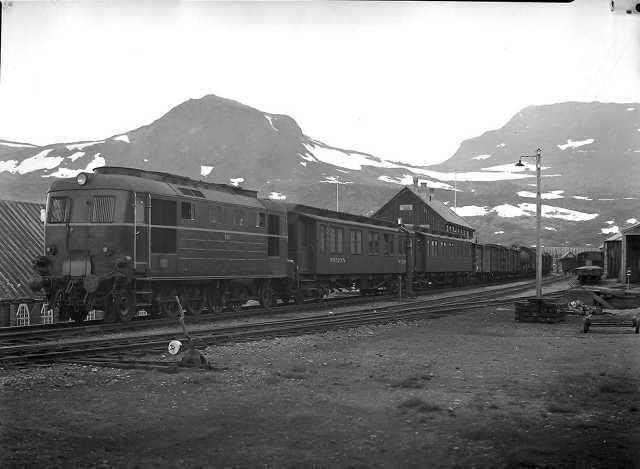
Di 1 at Finse Station in 1942

The locomotive was initially used on the Bergen Line. The advanced designed, combined with lack of suitable competence among NSB's staff and lack of spare parts, resulted in the locomotive seeing little revenue use. After a few years it was taken out of service and did not re-enter use until 1947, when the diesel shortage had diminished. A contributing factor was also the poor workmanship caused by the wartime industry. The locomotive was transferred from Oslo to Bergen District on 20 December 1945 and was used on the Bergen Line. During 1952 the locomotive started being used on the Dovre Line, and it was official transferred to Trondheim District on 20 October.

The class was important for NSB to gain insights into operations and technical aspects of diesel operations. This resulted in NSB taking delivery of the Di 2 class from 1954. The units remained the most powerful diesel locomotives used by NSB until the delivery of the Di 4 in the 1980s. On 4 October 1957 the engine returned to Oslo District, this time to be used on the Gjøvik Line, and to a less extent the Kongsvinger Line. The locomotive was retired on 24 July 1959, and sold to Brødrene London as scrap, and has thus not been preserved.

== Specifications ==
The diesel-hydraulic locomotive had a 1'BB'1 wheel arrangement and an overall length of 13.5 meters (44 ft 3 in). It was designed to be run i multiple and had a driver's cab in the one end only. The unit had two six-cylinder, four stroke diesel engines, the MAN W6V 30/38, each with a power output of 736 kilowatts (987 hp), giving a total power output of 1,472 kilowatts (1,974 hp). The locomotives weighed 82.7 tonnes (81.4 long tons; 91.2 short tons), giving a maximum axle load of 15 tonnes. The locomotives had a maximum speed of 100 km/h (62 mph), and were during revenue trials on the Bergen Line capable of reaching a maximum 88 km/h (55 mph) and 62 km/h (39 mph) up the steepest hills.

== Bibliography ==
- Aspenberg, Nils Carl (1999). Fra Roa til Bergen: historien om Bergensbanen (in Norwegian). Oslo: Baneforlaget. ISBN 82-91448-28-0.
