= NSB Di 2 =

Class of diesel-hydraulic locomotives

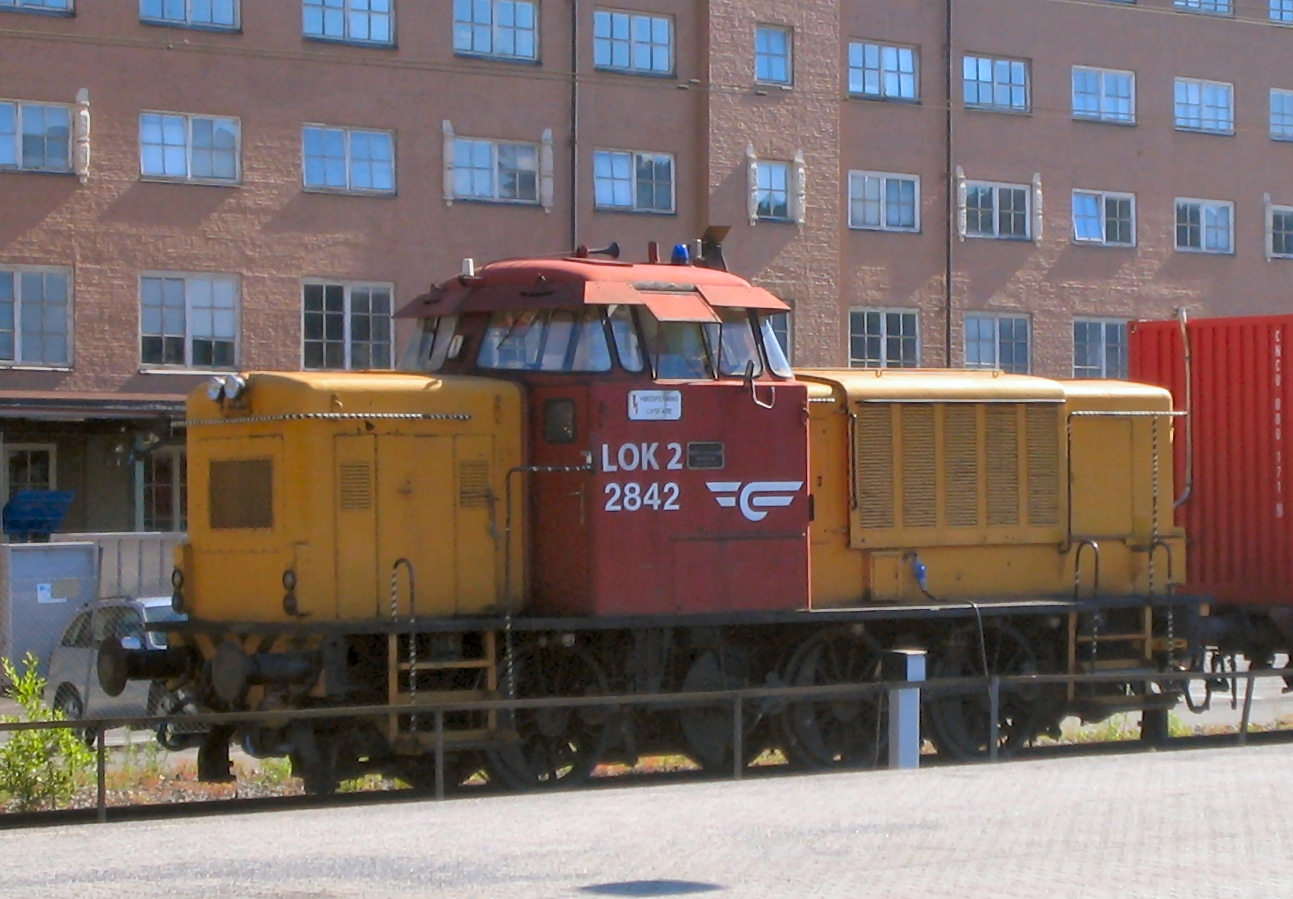
- Di 2 842 at Oslo Central Station
Type and origin
- Power type: Diesel-hydraulic
- Builder: Maschinenbau Kiel; Thune
- Build date: 1954–1973
Specifications
- Configuration
  - UIC: C
- Length: 10 m (32 ft 10 in)
- Loco weight: 45 t (44 long tons; 50 short tons) (MaK); 47.4 t (46.7 long tons; 52.2 short tons) (Thune)
- Transmission: Hydraulic
Performance figures
- Maximum speed: 50 km/h (31 mph) (shunting); 80 km/h (50 mph) (main line)
- Power output: 423 kW (567 hp) (MaK); 441 kW (591 hp) (BMV)
Career
- Operators: Norwegian State Railways
- Number in class: 54
- Numbers: 2 801 – 2 854
- First run: 1954

NSB Di 2 was a class of 54 diesel-hydraulic locomotives operated by the Norwegian State Railways (NSB). Six units were built by Maschinenbau Kiel (MaK) of Kiel, Germany, and the remaining by Thune in Oslo. The locomotives were used for shunting and for local and light freight trains throughout NSBs network. Based on MaK's 575C design, the locomotives were 10.0 meters (32 ft 10 in) long and had a C wheel arrangement.

The first six units were built by MaK and were delivered between 1954 and 1957. Thune delivered its first two units in 1958, with a MaK prime mover. These eight had a power output of 423 kilowatts (567 hp). All later production was carried out by Thune using prime movers from Bergen Mekaniske Verksted, with a power output of 441 kilowatts (591 hp). Further series consisted of fifteen units in 1962, sixteen in 1963–64, nine in 1970 and six in 1973.

One unit was upgraded with a Caterpillar prime mover and a new cab in 1997, and designated Skd 225. It remained in use until 2012, while the last of the other units were retired in the 2000s. Four locomotives have been preserved at heritage railways.

== History ==
NSB's first diesel locomotive was the Krupp-built Di 1, delivered in 1942. It had a poor operational record, being plagued with technical faults. Based on the experiences with the locomotives, NSB started in the 1950s to look into additional diesel-hydraulic locomotives for its un-electrified lines. NSB chose to test out the MaK 800D with a power output of 627 kilowatts (841 hp) and a D wheel arrangement. Although satisfied with the performance, NSB felt the locomotive was too powerful and instead opted for the smaller 575C. The 575C design had been delivered with two units to the Nynäs Line in Sweden in 1951. NSB's class was designated Di 2 and the three first locomotives, numbered 801 through 803, were delivered in 1954.

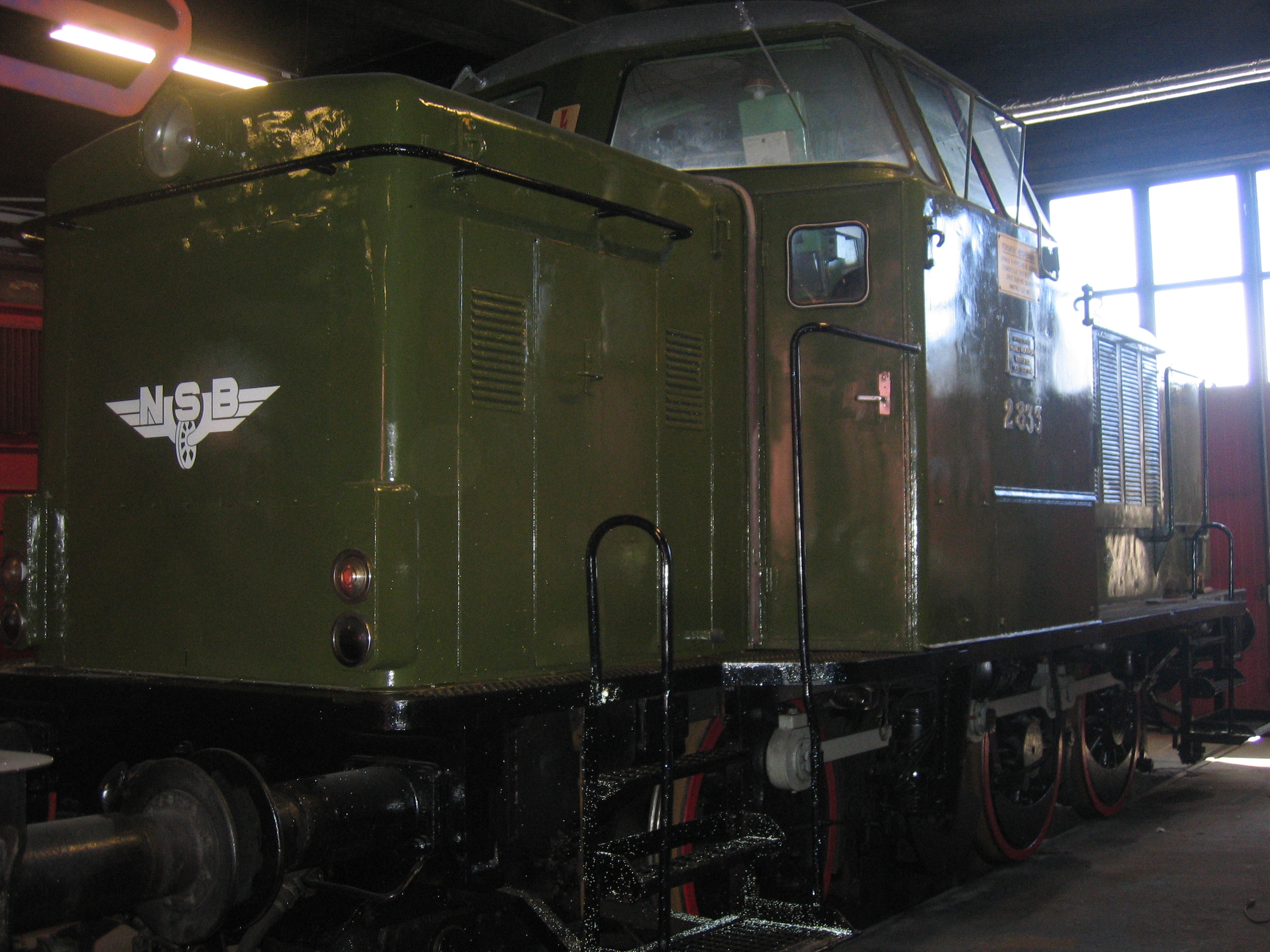
Thune-built 2.833 in the original green color scheme at the Norwegian Railway Museum

The second batch of locomotives consisted of three more units built by MaK, numbered 806 through 808, and delivered in 1957. The following year NSB took delivery of two units from Thune, numbered 804 and 805. All following production would be made by Thune, with prime movers from Bergen Mekaniske Verksted. The first fifteen of these were no. 808–823, delivered in 1962, followed by sixteen units, no. 824–839, in 1963 and 1964. Another series, the nine units numbered 840–848 was delivered in 1970 and the final series, the six units numbered 849–854, was delivered in 1973.

The main task of the Di 2 was heavy shunting and short-haul freight trains. From 1960 some units were stationed in Bergen and used for shunting at Voss Station and Ål Station. Three locomotives, no. 805, 808 and 817, have been prominently featured in Olsenbanden films. Two locomotives, 827 and 829, were repainted and used for the Semsame Train in the children television series Sesam stasjon.

Retirement started during the 1990s. As of 1999 there were fifteen remaining units in use, including all of the 1973 batch, and the oldest from the 1963–64 batch. Di 2 854 was in 1997 rebuilt in the Netherlands with a new Caterpillar engine and driver's cab, receiving the new designation Skd 225. Four locomotives have been preserved by Bergen Technical Museum (817), the Norwegian Railway Club (827), the Norwegian Railway Museum (833) and the Setesdal Line (843).

== Specifications ==
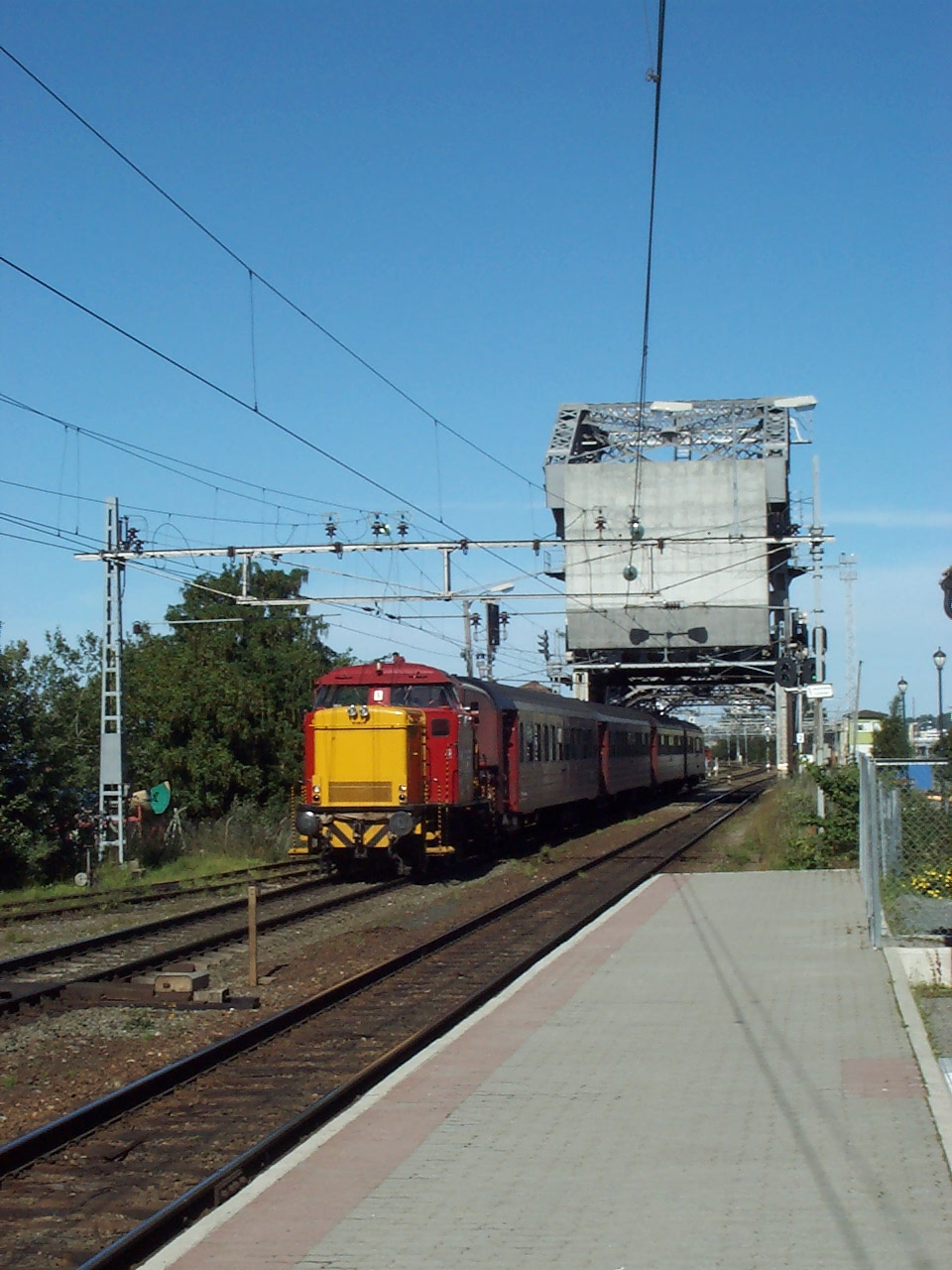
Di 2 hauling a train over Skansen Bridge just south of Trondheim Central Station in 2000

Common for all series is an overall length of 10.0 meters (32 ft 10 in) and a C wheel arrangement. The class was 2.29 meters (7 ft 6 in) wide and 4.3 meters (14 ft 1 in) tall. The locos had a maximum permitted speed of 80 km/h (50 mph) on main line service and 50 km/h (31 mph) during shunting. The MaK six-cylinder prime movers gave a power output of 423 kilowatts (567 hp), the first three being of the MS 30 A model and the second five of the MS 301 A model. This gave 740 and 750 revolutions per minute, respectively. The Bergen prime movers were slightly more powerful, giving a power output of 441 kilowatts (591 hp). The MaK units weighed 45 tonnes (44 long tons; 50 short tons), while the Thune units weighed 47.2 tonnes (46.5 long tons; 52.0 short tons).

Gradual changes to the design were made as production advanced. The 1962 series saw the introduction of the heavier Bergen engines and new cabs, increasing the axle load from 15 to 16.5 tonnes. The 1963–64 series saw improvements to the dead man's switch and the cooling system. The 1970 series introduced a sideways flexible mid-axle. At first the Di 2 engines were painted green, but later when NSB chose to paint its entire fleet red, the Di 2 engines were also converted to red. In the 1980s the Di 2 units were painted the distinct red and yellow shunter colors of NSB.

== Bibliography ==
- Aspenberg, Nils Carl (1999). Fra Roa til Bergen: historien om Bergensbanen (in Norwegian). Oslo: Baneforlaget. ISBN 82-91448-28-0.
