= Nordnes =

Coordinates: 60°23′53″N 5°18′30″E

- Neighbourhood
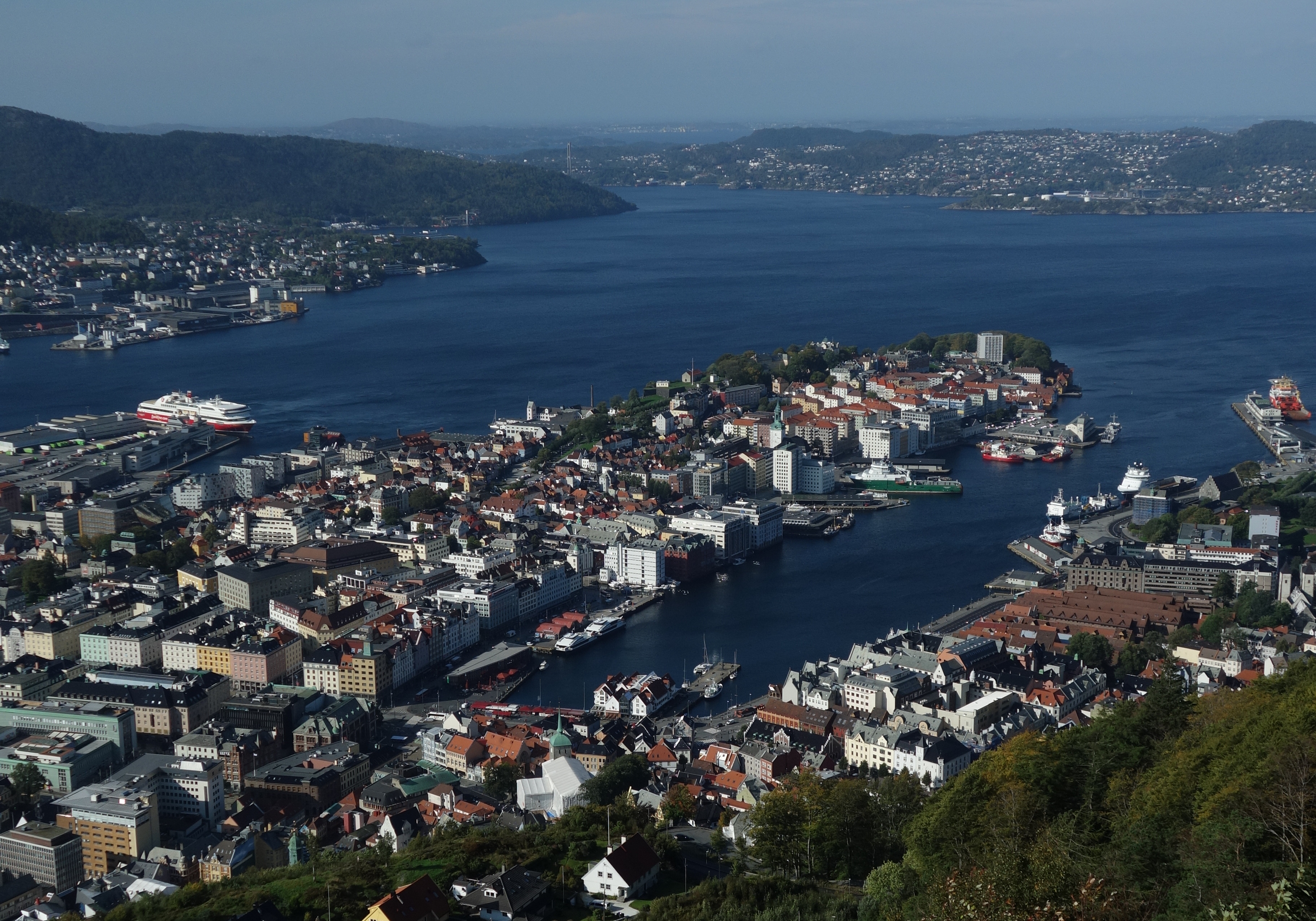
- View of Nordnes (center) and Vågen from Fløyen
- Nickname: Nordnes
- Interactive map of Nordnes
- Country: Norway
- County: Vestland
- District: Midhordland
- Municipality: Bergen
- Borough: Bergenhus

Area
  - Total: 0.20 km^{2} (0.077 sq mi)

Population (2010)
  - Total: 1,817
  - Density: 9,100/km^{2} (24,000/sq mi)
- As an unofficial area the population can't be fully determined
- Time zone: UTC+01:00 (CET)
  - Summer (DST): UTC+02:00 (CEST)

Nordnes is a peninsula and neighbourhood in the city centre of Bergen in Vestland county, Norway.

Vågen, Byfjorden, and Puddefjorden surround the peninsula. The Bergen Aquarium is located at the tip of the peninsula. The Norwegian Institute of Marine Research and Fredriksberg Fortress are also located on Nordnes. The parish church, Nykirken i Bergen, is located in this neighborhood.

The neighbourhood of Nordnes includes approximately 50% of the peninsula. The neighbourhoods Strandsiden and Verftet, as well as parts of Nøstet, are also located on Nordnes.

Recreation areas include Nordnes Park and the Ballast Pier (Ballastbryggen).

One of the main recreation activities is visiting Nordnes sjøbad. This is an outdoor swimming facility with a heated pool and possibility to swim in the fjord. Nordnes sjøbad is open from 18 May to 1 September.

Nordnes was also a place of execution in the 14th century, including Audun Hugleiksson and False Margaret.

== Gallery ==
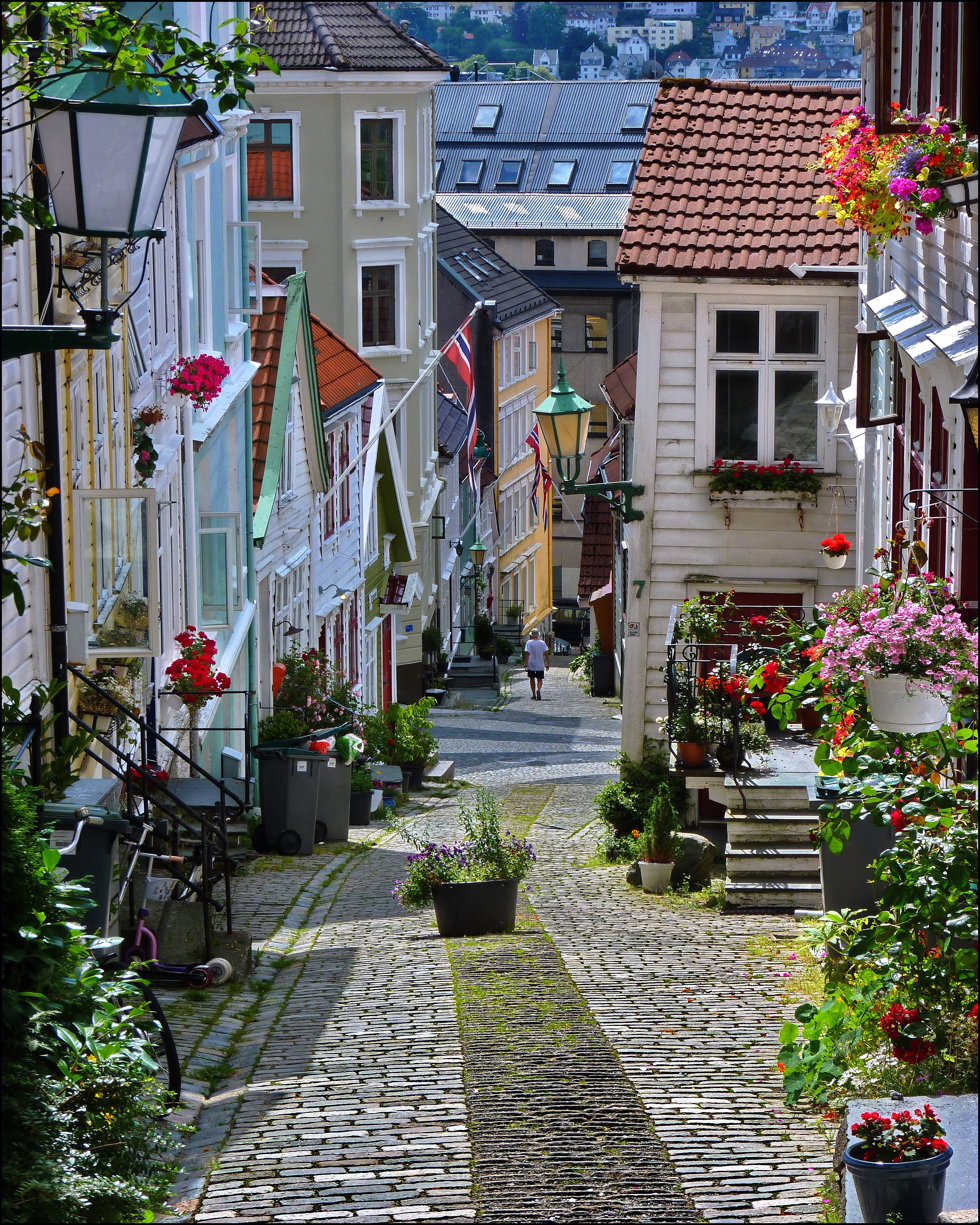
Nøstet

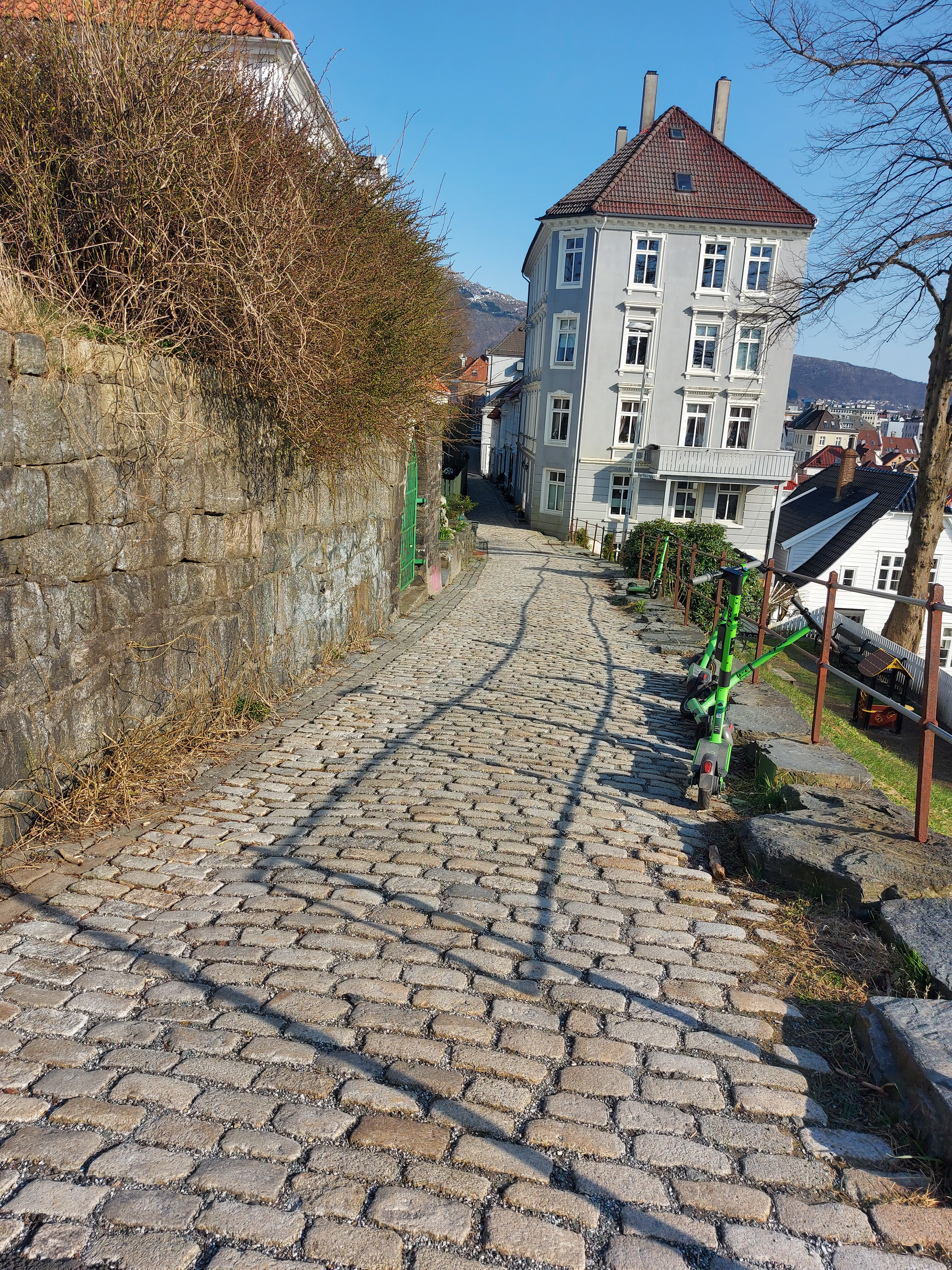
Galgebakken

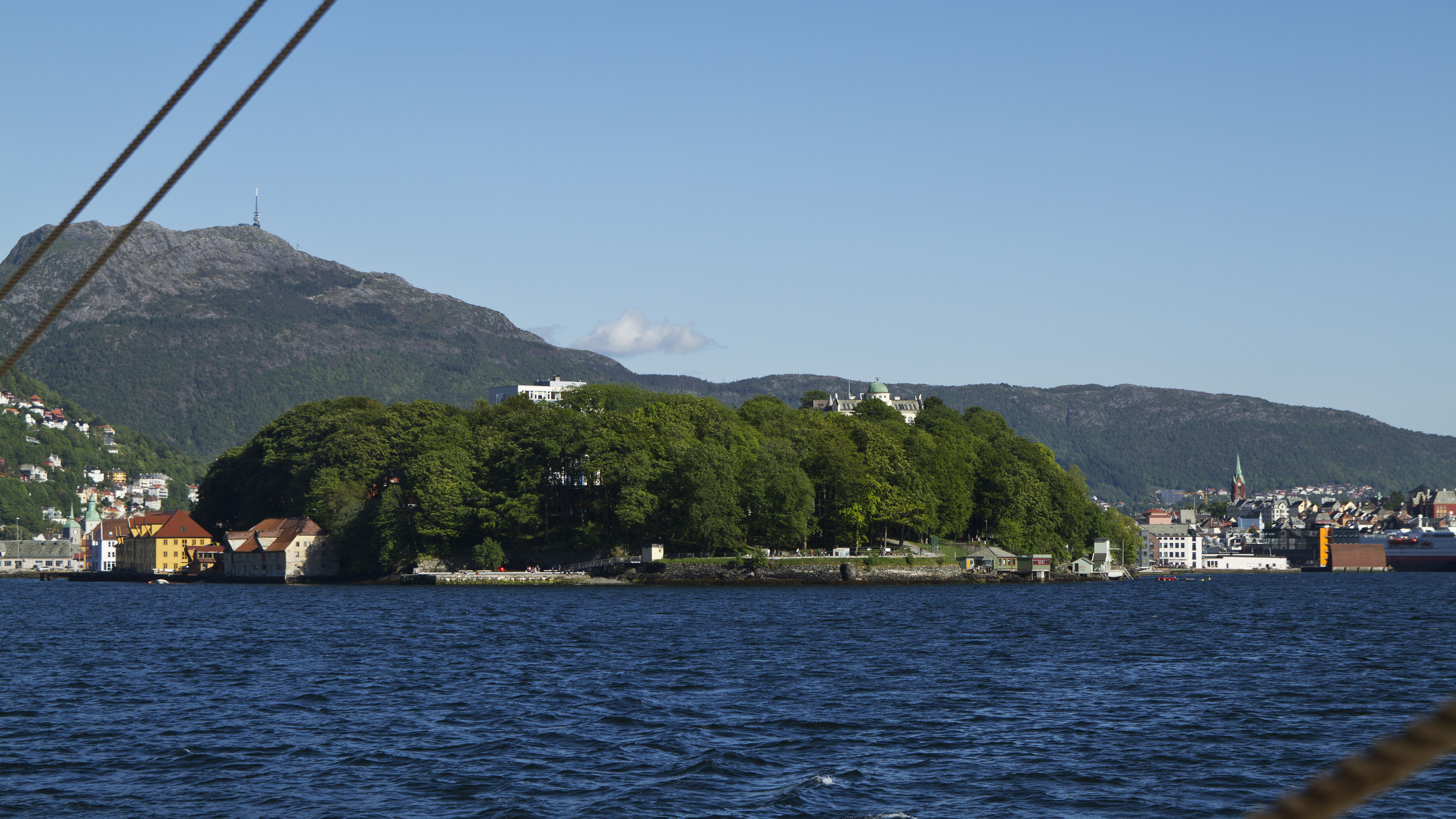
Nordnesparken

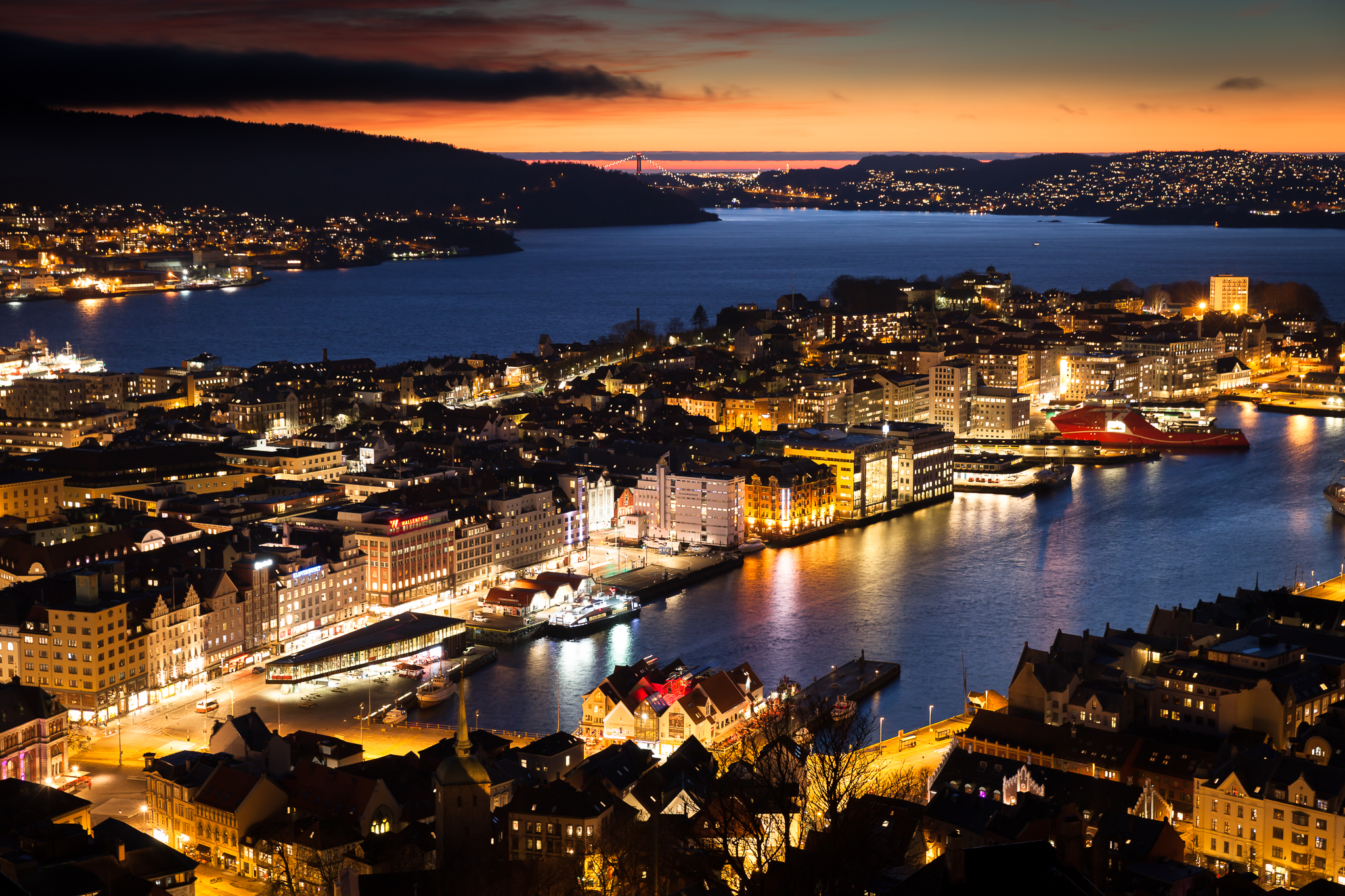
View of Nordnes from Fløyen at night

== Other sources ==
- Hartvedt, Gunnar Hagen (1994). "Nordnes". Bergen byleksikon (in Norwegian). Oslo: Kunnskapsforlaget. p. 340. ISBN 82-573-0485-9.
