= Bergen Aquarium =

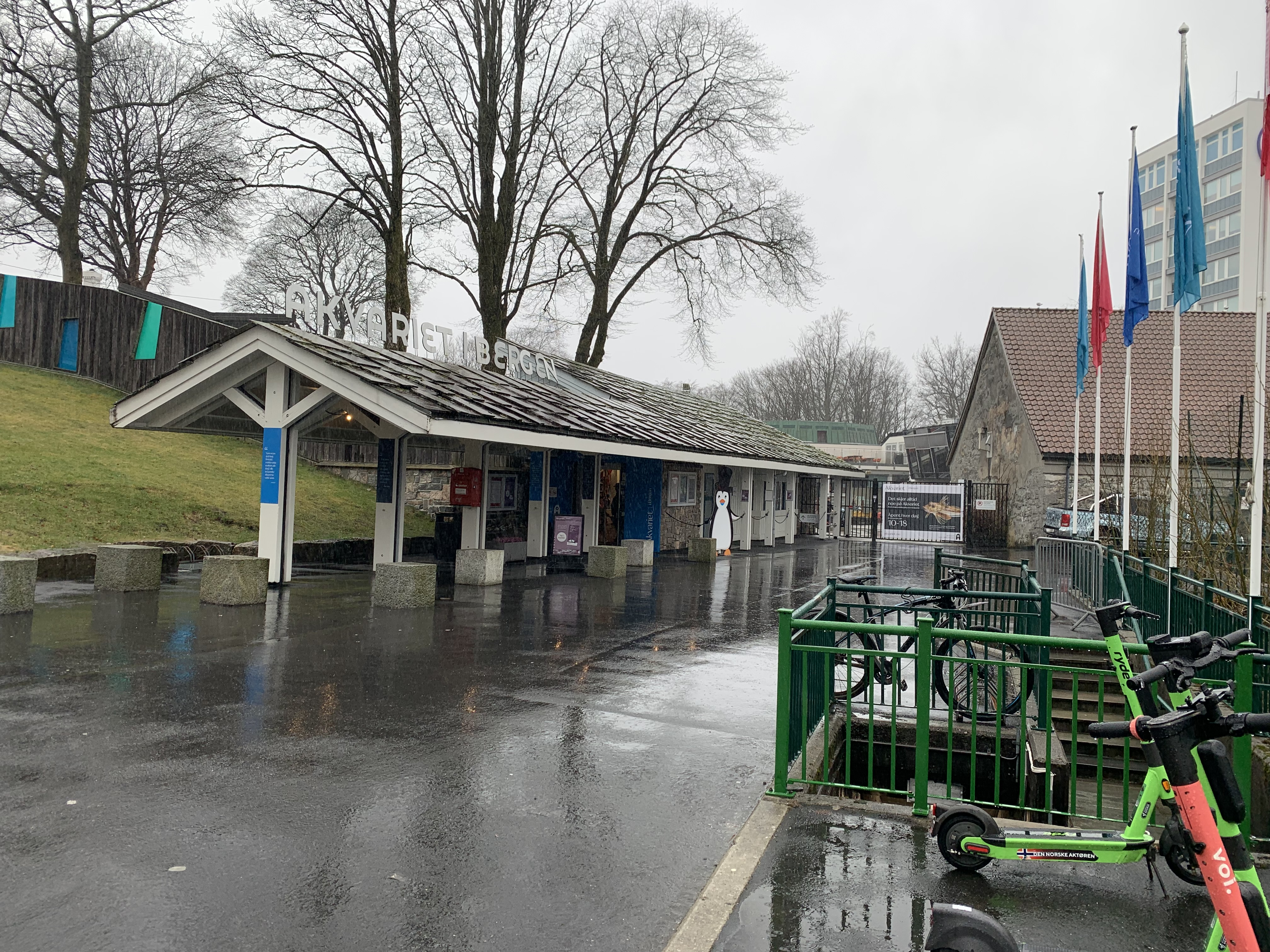
- The main entrance.
- Interactive map of Bergen Aquarium
- 60.3997°N 5.3038°E
- Date opened: 27 August 1960
- Location: Bergen, Norway
- Website: www.akvariet.no

Bergen Aquarium (Norwegian: 'Akvariet i Bergen') is a public aquarium in Bergen, Norway. It is situated on the Nordnes peninsula and is one of Bergen's tourist attractions.

== History ==
When it opened on 27 August 1960, it was considered to be the largest and most modern aquarium in Northern Europe. The buildings were designed by architects Hans Chr. Gaaserud and Helge Simers in 1952. Architect Ola B. Åsness was attached to the project during the construction phase. Gunnar Rollefsen designed the interior. Construction in 1995 included the addition of a movie theater.

== Exhibits ==
Bergen Aquarium features more than 300 species. The complex houses over 60 tanks of fish, marine invertebrates, as well as three outdoor ponds with seals, penguins and cyprinids and a tropical branch with reptiles and monkeys.

== Gallery ==
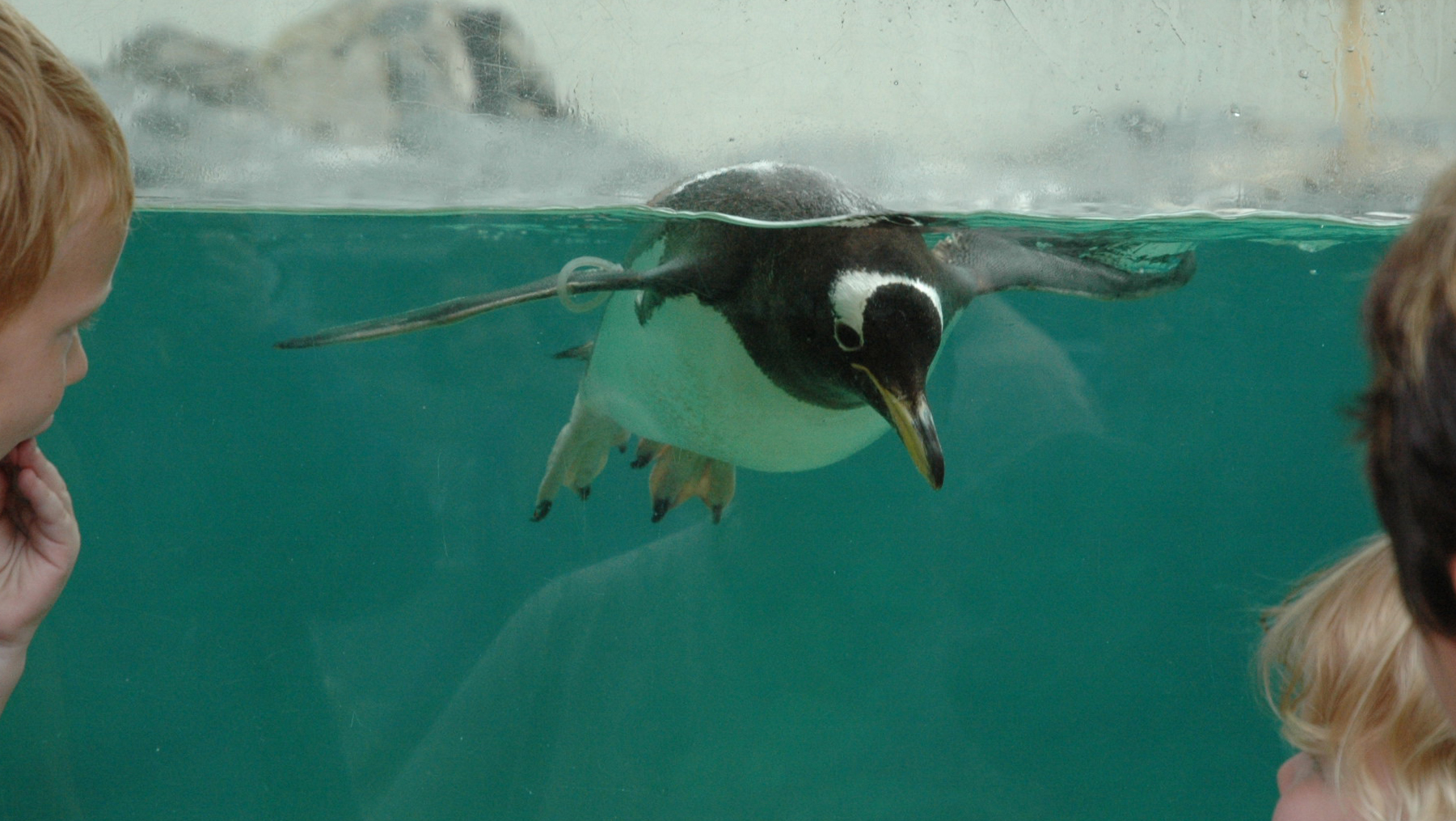
Penguin at Bergen Aquarium

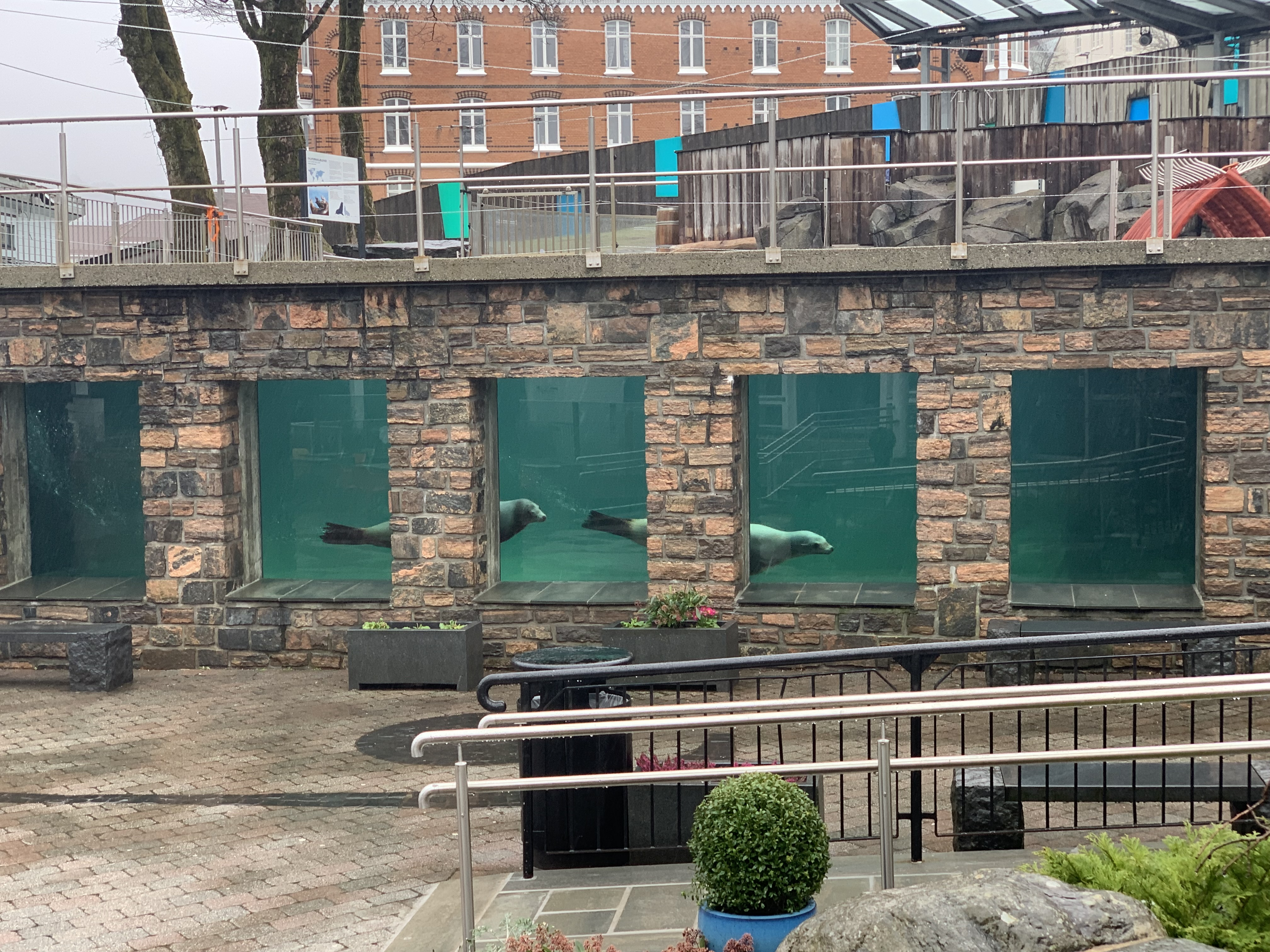
Seals

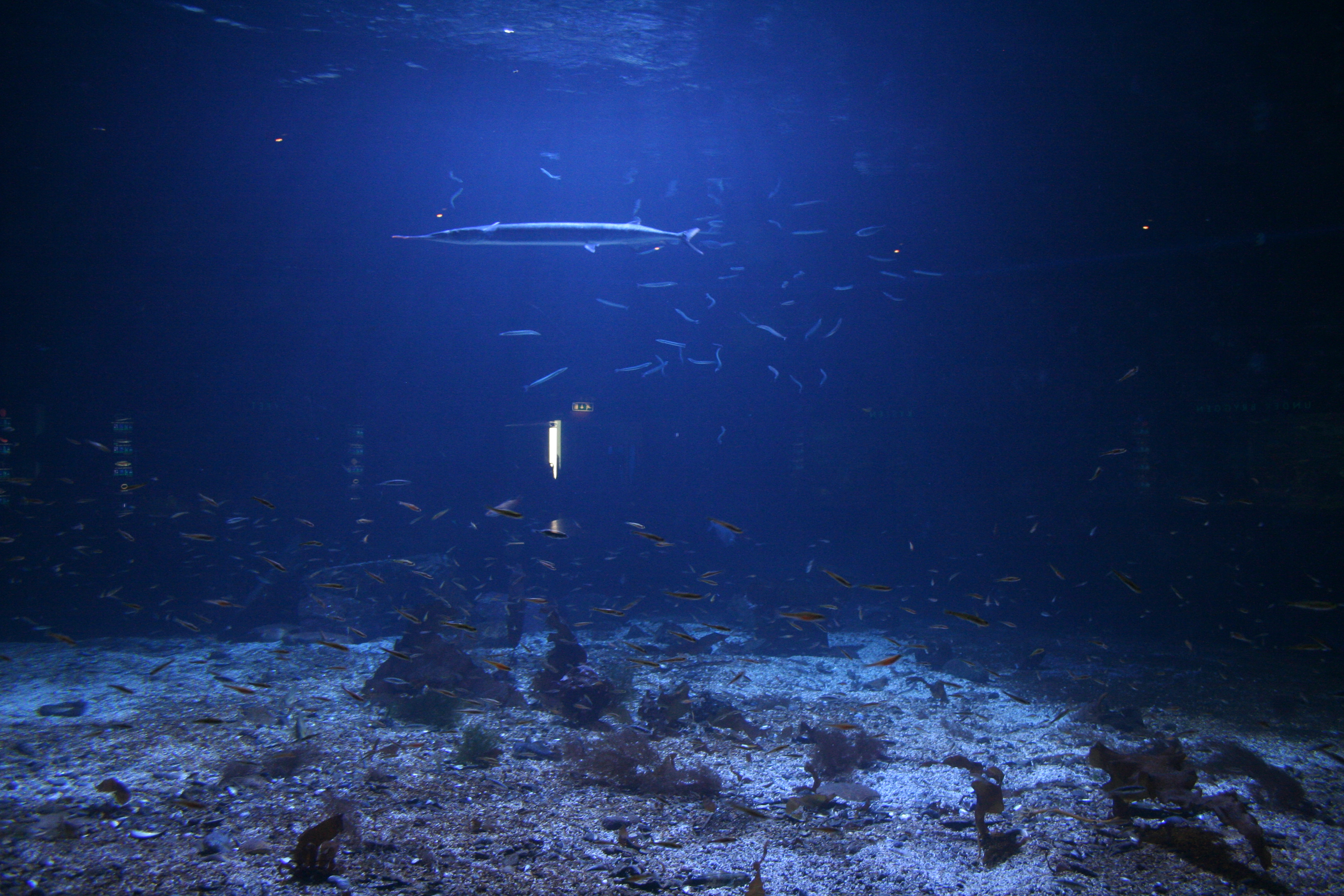

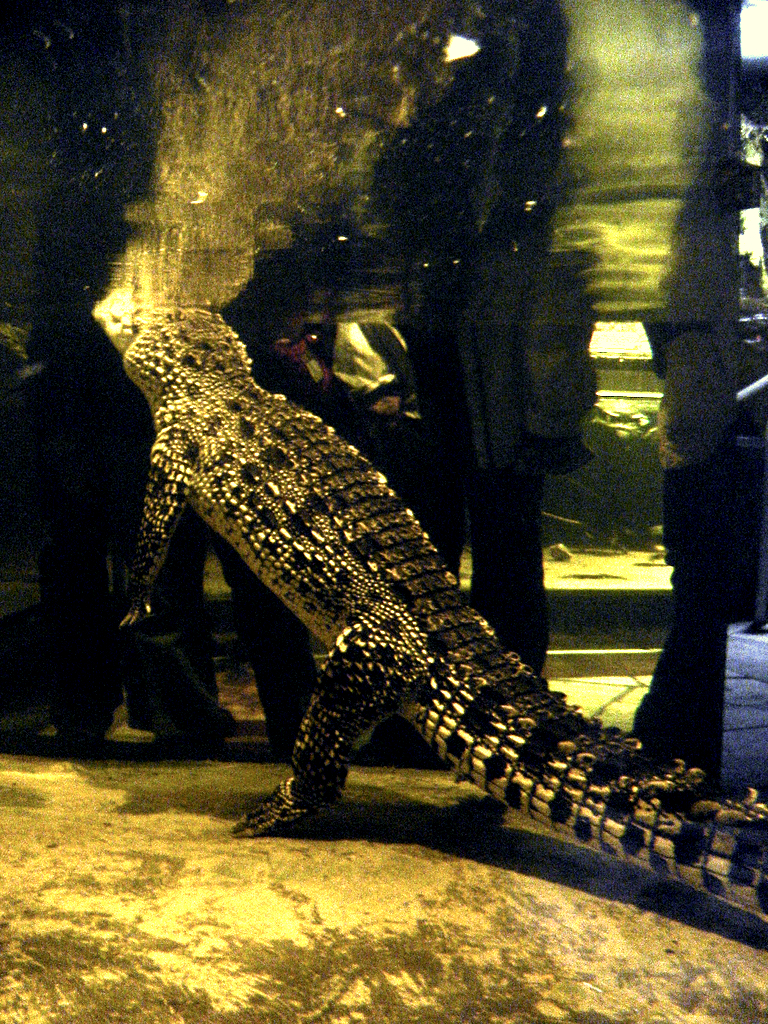

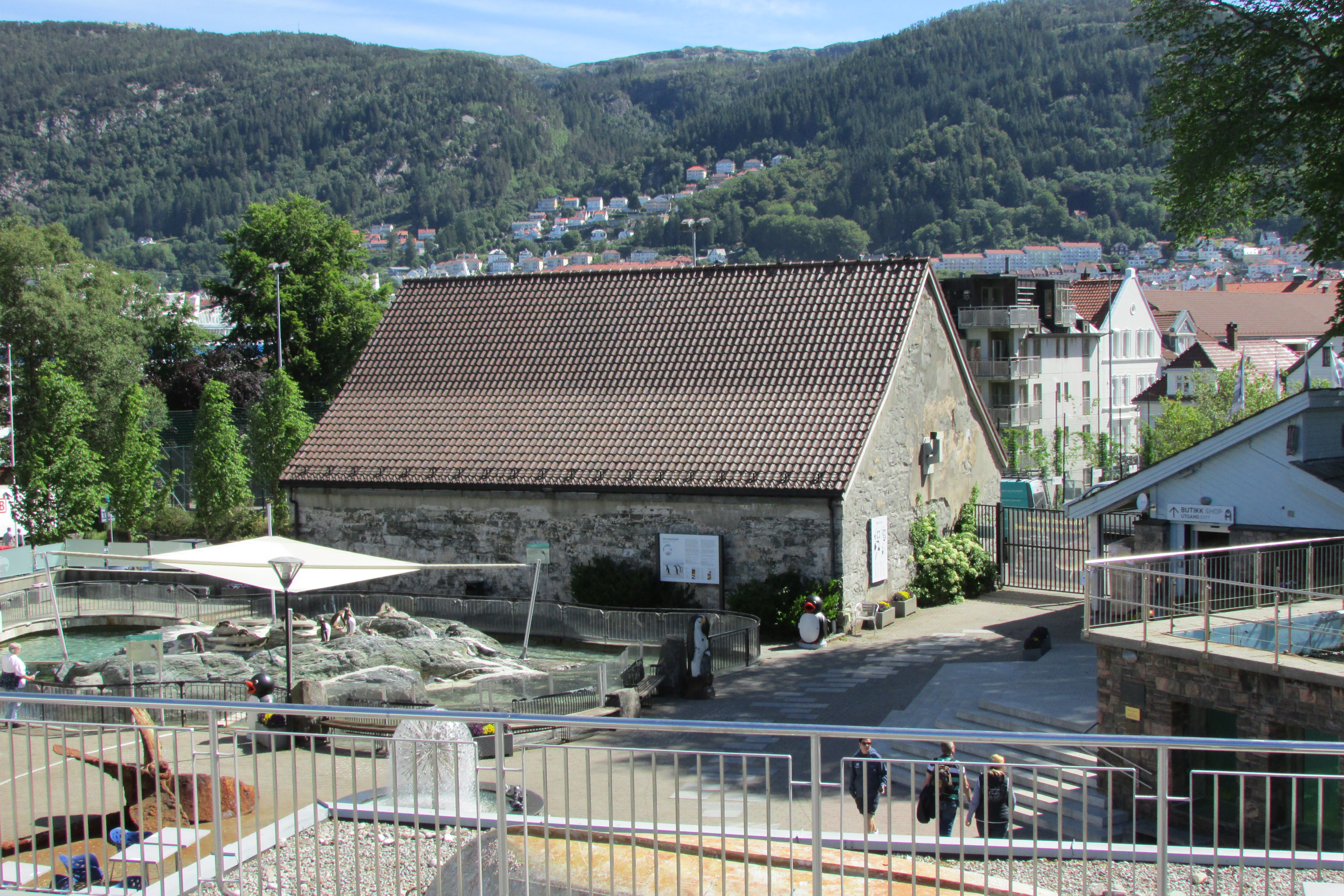

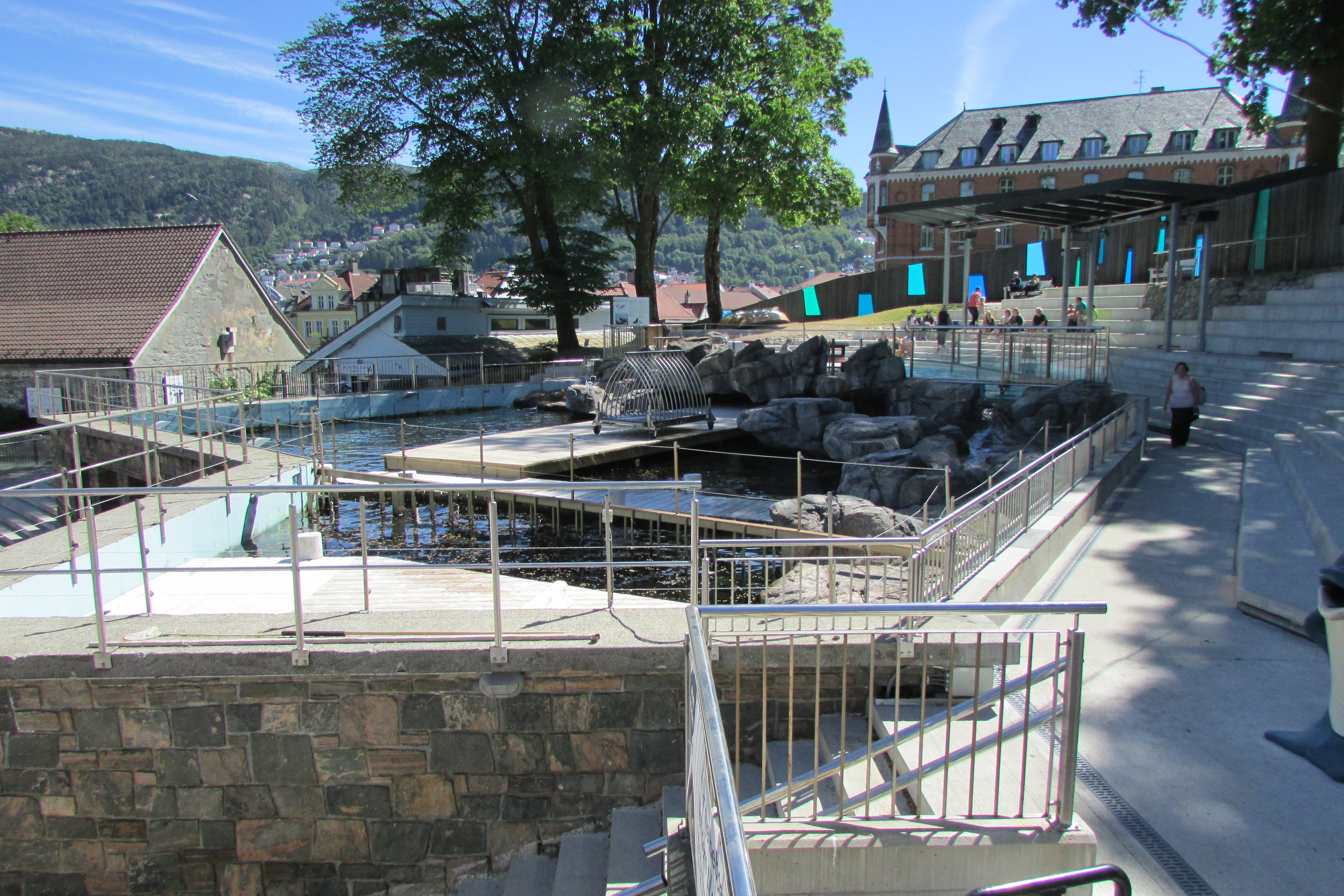

== Other sources ==
- Hartvedt, Gunnar Hagen (1994). "Akvariet". Bergen byleksikon (in Norwegian). Oslo: Kunnskapsforlaget. pp. 63–64. ISBN 82-573-0485-9.
- Welle-Strand, Erling (1974) Museums in Norway (Oslo: Royal Ministry of Foreign Affairs) ISBN 8271770039.
