= Visekongene =

Norwegian band

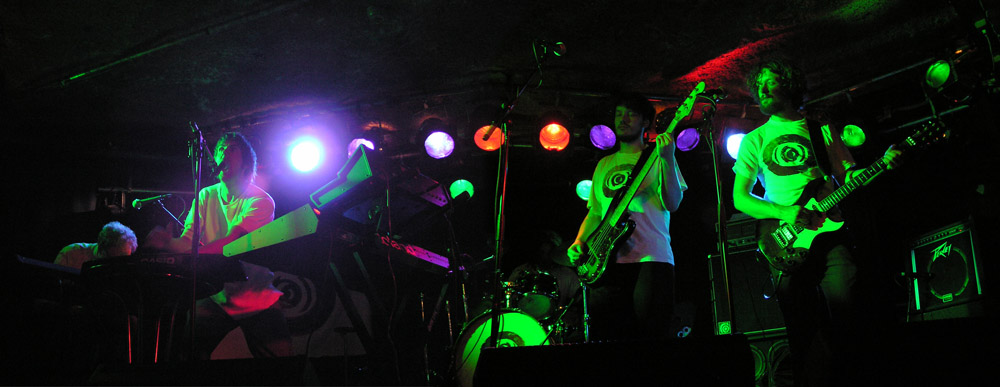

Background information
- Origin: Norway
- Genres: Progressive rock
- Years active: 2001—present
- Label: Havremusikk
- Members: Jon Are Sundland; Erik Faugstad; Tor Kristian Ervik; Jan Frode Haugseth
- Past members: Fredrik Moltu Johnsen; Morten Johannes Ervik; Hans Christian Van Nijkerk

Visekongene is a band from Bergen, Norway. Their music can generally be defined as progressive rock, but they also mix in elements from metal, jazz, rock, pop, Children's music, old school Video game music and many other musical styles. Founded in 2001 by Fredrik Moltu "IPF" Johnsen (keyboards and vocals), Jon Are Sundland (keyboards and vocals), Erik "Satosh" Faugstad (guitars and vocals), Tor Kristian Ervik (drums and vocals) and Morten Johannes "mortenjohs" Ervik (bass and vocals).

Erik replaced Morten and Jan Frode Haugseth ("Jafro") replaced Erik in April 2005.

The band in its entirety is also two thirds of the band écapito.

== Discography ==
=== Albums ===
EPen (2004)	released in limited numbers the first 100 or so with unique artwork in June 2004
7:42 (2005)	aka 'Visekongene' released as double LP and CD in February 2005.
