= Fjordaposten =

Norwegian newspaper

Fjordaposten was a Norwegian newspaper, published in Bergen.

It started on 28 September 1923 and had the same editor-in-chief throughout its existence, Albert Joleik. His family members were aiding him in administration, finances and more. Its target group was rural readers, and the newspaper was written in Landsmål/Nynorsk with traces of Joleik's own orthography. The last issue came on 4 April 1940; the occupation of Norway by Nazi Germany then put a stop to further publishing.
