= Skjelvika =

Village in Askøy Municipality, Norway

Skjelvika Skjelviki
- Village
- Interactive map of Skjelvika
- Coordinates: 60.50386°N 5.14301°E
- Country: Norway
- Region: Western Norway
- County: Vestland
- District: Midhordland
- Municipality: Askøy Municipality
- Elevation: 21 m (69 ft)
- Time zone: UTC+01:00 (CET)
  - Summer (DST): UTC+02:00 (CEST)
- Post Code: 5307 Ask

Skjelvika is a small village in Askøy Municipality in Vestland county, Norway. It is located along the Herdlefjorden on the northern shore of the island of Askøy. It lies just north of the larger village of Hanevik.

== History ==
Skjelviki was historically part of the old Alversund Municipality. On 15 October 1923, the western part of Alversund Municipality (including Skjelvika) was separated into the new Meland Municipality. On 1 January 1964, the district of Hanevik, then with 193 inhabitants and including the Skjelvika area, was transferred to the new Askøy Municipality.
