= Erdal, Vestland =

Village in Askøy Municipality, Norway

Erdal
- Village
- Interactive map of Erdal
- Coordinates: 60.44264°N 5.22709°E
- Country: Norway
- Region: Western Norway
- County: Vestland
- District: Midhordland
- Municipality: Askøy Municipality
- Elevation: 19 m (62 ft)
- Time zone: UTC+01:00 (CET)
  - Summer (DST): UTC+02:00 (CEST)
- Post Code: 5306 Erdal

Erdal is a village in Askøy Municipality in Vestland county, Norway. The village is located along the Byfjorden on the southeastern coast of the island of Askøy. The village lies in a valley just north of the mountain Kolbeinsvarden, the tallest mountain on the island. The villages of Florvåg and Kleppestø lie just to the south of Erdal. In 2006, Erdal Church was built in the village, serving the southeastern part of the island. There are also two schools in Erdal: a municipal pre-school and an elementary school.

The village is part of the urban area known as Askøy which covers most of the southern part of the island of Askøy. Statistics Norway tracks data for Askøy, but it does not separately track the population statistics for this village area. The population of the whole Askøy urban area (in 2025) was 24,660.
