= Abbedisso =

Village in Askøy Municipality, Norway

- Village
- Interactive map of Abbedisso
- Coordinates: 60.53844°N 5.01718°E
- Country: Norway
- Region: Western Norway
- County: Vestland
- District: Midhordland
- Municipality: Askøy Municipality
- Elevation: 19 m (62 ft)
- Time zone: UTC+01:00 (CET)
  - Summer (DST): UTC+02:00 (CEST)
- Post Code: 5314 Kjerrgarden

Abbedisso is a small village in Askøy Municipality in Vestland county, Norway. It is located along the Herdlefjorden near the northwestern tip of the island of Askøy. The village of Io lies directly to the north on the island of Holsnøy, just across the fjord.

== Name ==
The name Abbedisso is very similar to the Norwegian language word abbedisse meaning abbess, as in the head of a nunnery. During Catholic times in Norway, there may have been a nunnery in this area.
