= Tveitevåg =

Village in Askøy Municipality, Norway

- Village
- Interactive map of Tveitevåg
- Coordinates: 60.44667°N 5.13389°E
- Country: Norway
- Region: Western Norway
- County: Vestland
- District: Midhordland
- Municipality: Askøy Municipality
- Elevation: 8 m (26 ft)
- Time zone: UTC+01:00 (CET)
  - Summer (DST): UTC+02:00 (CEST)
- Post Code: 5310 Hauglandshella

Tveitevåg is a village in Askøy Municipality in Vestland county, Norway. The village is located along the Hauglandsosen bay on the western coast of the island of Askøy. The village surrounds the lake Storavatnet, just east of the Kollevågen nature reserve. Tveit Church is located in the village. Historically, the area was home to a large mill, but it is now closed.

The village is part of the urban area known as Askøy which covers most of the southern part of the island of Askøy. Statistics Norway tracks data for Askøy, but it does not separately track the population statistics for this village area. The population of the whole Askøy urban area (in 2025) was 24,660.
