= Hanevik =

Village in Askøy Municipality, Norway

- Village
- View of the village
- Interactive map of Hanevik
- Coordinates: 60.49925°N 5.15064°E
- Country: Norway
- Region: Western Norway
- County: Vestland
- District: Midhordland
- Municipality: Askøy Municipality
- Elevation: 10 m (33 ft)
- Time zone: UTC+01:00 (CET)
  - Summer (DST): UTC+02:00 (CEST)
- Post Code: 5307 Ask

Hanevik is a village in Askøy Municipality in Vestland county, Norway. It is located along the Herdlefjorden, on the northeastern shore of the island of Askøy. The lake Askevatnet lies just southeast of the village.

== History ==
Hanevik was historically a part of the large parish of Hammer Municipality. In 1885, Hammer Municipality was divided and Hanevik became a part of the new Alversund Municipality. On 15 October 1923, Hanevik and all of Alversund Municipality on the island of Holsnøy was separated to become the new Meland Municipality. On 1 January 1964, Hanevik was transferred from Meland Municipality to the new Askøy Municipality. At that time, the village had 193 inhabitants.
