= Askøy Municipality =

Municipality in Vestland, Norway

Askøy Municipality Askøy kommune
- Municipality
- Askøen herred (historic name)
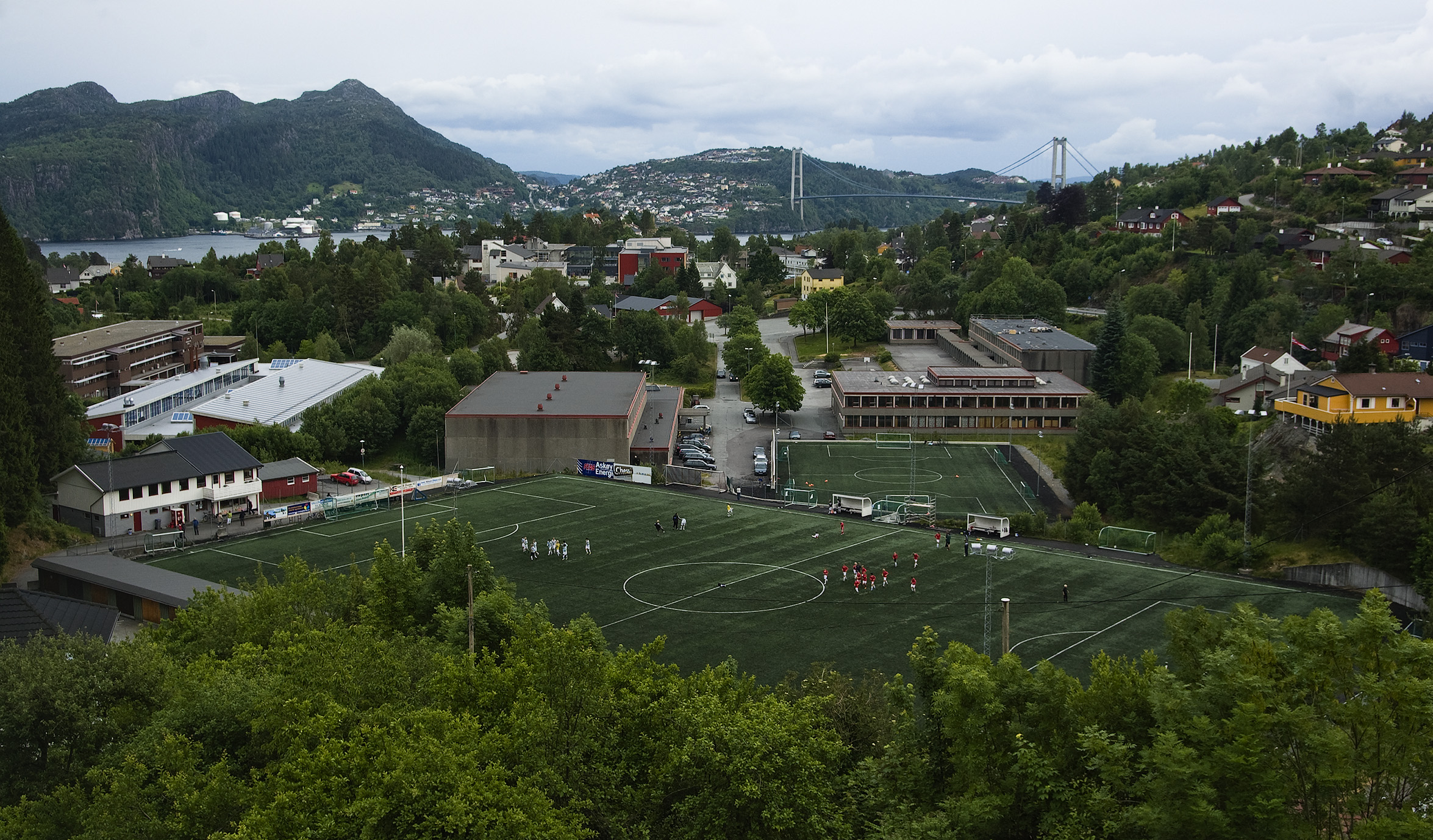
- Askøy in mid-June 2008

- Coat of arms

- Vestland within Norway

- Askøy within Vestland
- Coordinates: 60°28′17″N 05°09′38″E
- Country: Norway
- County: Vestland
- District: Midhordland
- Established: 1 Jan 1838
  - Created as: Formannskapsdistrikt
- Administrative centre: Kleppestø

Government
  - Mayor (2023): Yngve Fosse (H)

Area
  - Total: 101.1 km^{2} (39.0 sq mi)
  - Land: 94.4 km^{2} (36.4 sq mi)
  - Water: 6.7 km^{2} (2.6 sq mi) 6.6%
  - Rank: #329 in Norway
- Highest elevation: 231.03 m (758.0 ft)

Population (2025)
  - Total: 30,377
  - Rank: #36 in Norway
  - Density: 300.5/km^{2} (778/sq mi)
  - Change (10 years): ▲ +10.2%
- Demonym: Askøyværing

Official language
  - Norwegian form: Neutral
- Time zone: UTC+01:00 (CET)
  - Summer (DST): UTC+02:00 (CEST)
- ISO 3166 code: NO-4627
- Website: Official website

Askøy is a municipality in Vestland county, Norway. The island municipality is located in the Midhordland district of the county, sitting in a large group of islands immediately northwest of the city of Bergen, which is the country's second most populous. The administrative centre of the municipality is the urban village of Kleppestø on the southeastern shore of the island of Askøy. The urban area of Askøy is located in the southern part of the municipality. Some notable villages in the municipality include Abbedisso, Hanevik, and Skjelvika.

The 101-square-kilometre (39 sq mi) municipality is the 329th largest by area out of the 357 municipalities in Norway. Askøy Municipality is the 36th most populous municipality in Norway with a population of 30,377. The municipality's population density is 300.5 inhabitants per square kilometre (778/sq mi) and its population has increased by 10.2% over the previous 10 years. Since the opening of the Askøy Bridge connecting it to the mainland of Bergen Municipality in 1992, the population has increased rapidly. Its population growth is among the highest in Norway. Most of the population growth is due to migration from Bergen and the surrounding districts of Nordhordland and Midhordland.

== General information ==
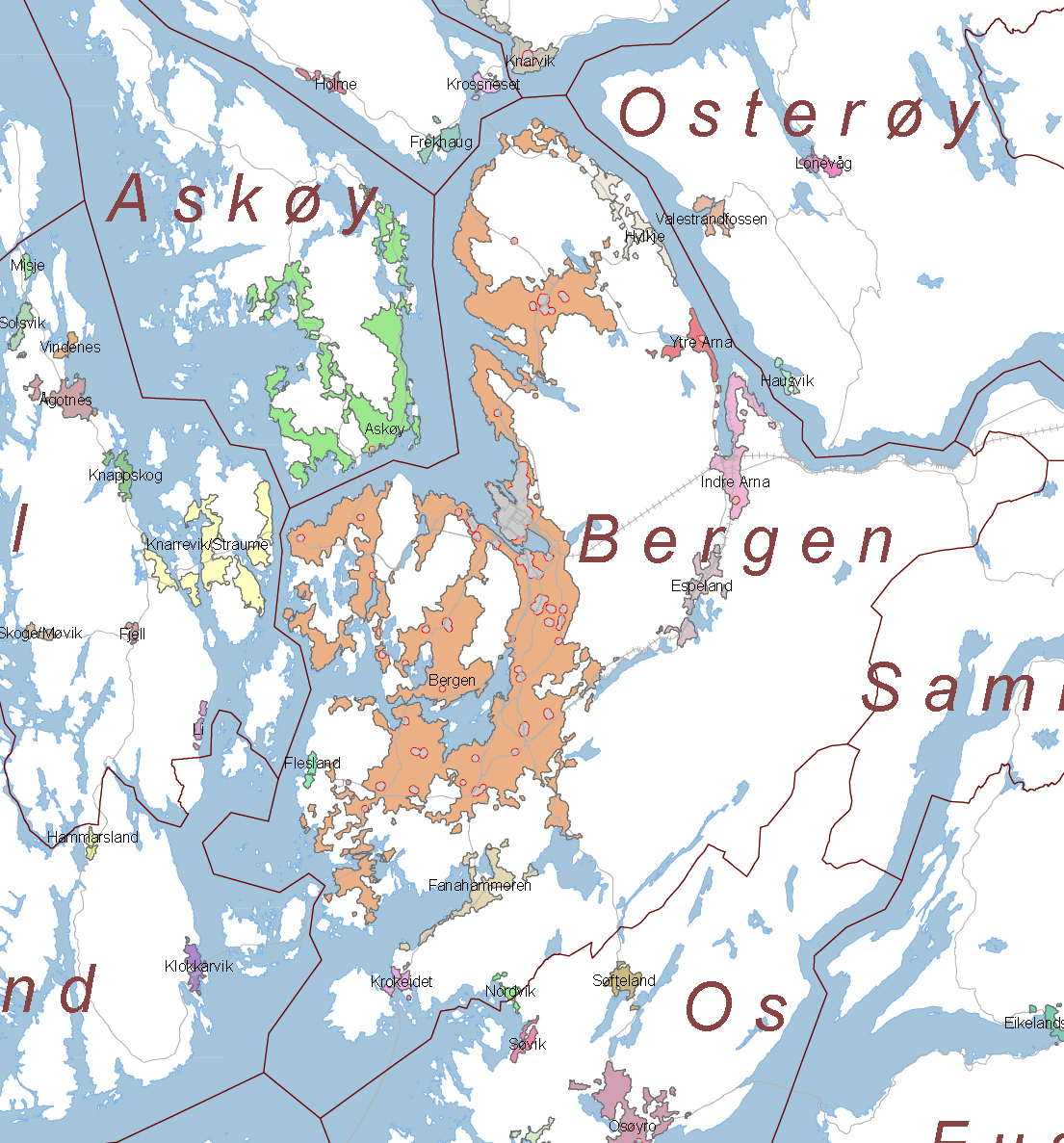
Map of the urban areas of Askøy, in relation to the city of Bergen

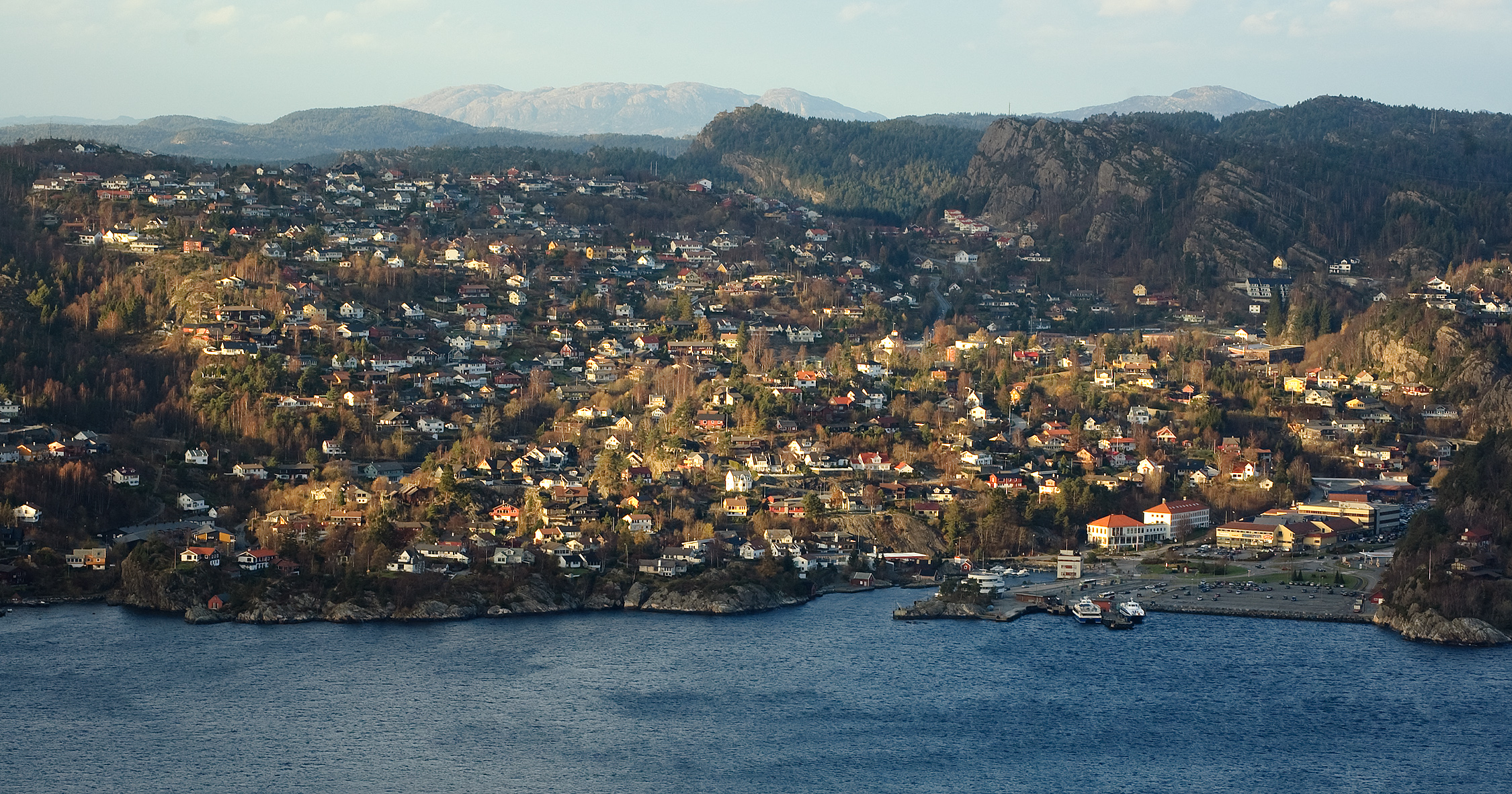
View of Kleppestø, looking northwest

The parish of Askøen (later spelled Askøy) was established as a municipality on 1 January 1838 (see formannskapsdistrikt law). In 1879, a small area of the neighboring Fana Municipality (population: 18) was transferred to Askøen. On 1 January 1904, a small area near the village of Hanevik (population: 32) was transferred from Askøen Municipality to the neighboring Alversund Municipality. On 1 July 1918, the southern (mainland) portions of Askøy Municipality (population: 6,957) were separated from the municipality to form the new Laksevåg Municipality. This split left Askøy Municipality with 4,822 residents.

During the 1960s, there were many municipal mergers across Norway due to the work of the Schei Committee. On 1 January 1964, the Hanevik area (population: 193) on the island of Askøy was transferred from Meland Municipality to Askøy Municipality. Also on that date, the old Herdla Municipality was dissolved. The parts of Herdla Municipality that were located on the island of Askøy and on the island of Herdla (population: 1,564) were all transferred into Askøy Municipality. This boundary adjustment put the entire island of Askøy, the island of Herdla, and many tiny surrounding islands in Askøy Municipality.

Historically, this municipality was part of the old Hordaland county. On 1 January 2020, the municipality became a part of the newly-formed Vestland county (after Hordaland and Sogn og Fjordane counties were merged).

=== Name ===
The municipality (originally the parish) is named after the island of Askøy. The first element is named after the old Ask farm (Old Norse: Askr) since the first Ask Church was built there. The name is identical to the word askr which means "ash tree". The last element is øy which means "island". Historically, the name of the municipality was spelled Askøen. On 3 November 1917, a royal resolution changed the spelling of the name of the municipality to Askøy, removing the definite form ending -en. The letter y was added to the end of the word to "Norwegianize" the name (ø is the Danish word for "island" and øy is the Norwegian word).

=== Coat of arms ===
The coat of arms was granted on 28 September 1961. The blazon is "Argent, an ash tree on an island vert" (Norwegian: Eit grønt asketre på ei øy mot botn i sølv). This means the arms have a field (background) has a tincture of argent which means it is commonly colored white, but if it is made out of metal, then silver is used. The charge is a large ash tree on an island with three waves below. The arms are a canting since the name of the municipality means something like ash tree island. The arms were designed by Magnus Hardeland. The municipal flag has the same design as the coat of arms.

=== Churches ===
The Church of Norway has five parishes (sokn) within Askøy Municipality. It is part of the Vesthordland prosti deanery in the Diocese of Bjørgvin.

Churches in Askøy Municipality
Parish (sokn)	Church name	Location of the church	Year built
Ask	Ask Church	Ask	1908
Erdal	Erdal Church	Erdal	2006
Herdla	Herdla Church	Herdla	1951
Strusshamn	Strusshamn Church	Strusshamn	1969
Tveit	Tveit Church	Tveitevåg	1957

== Culture ==
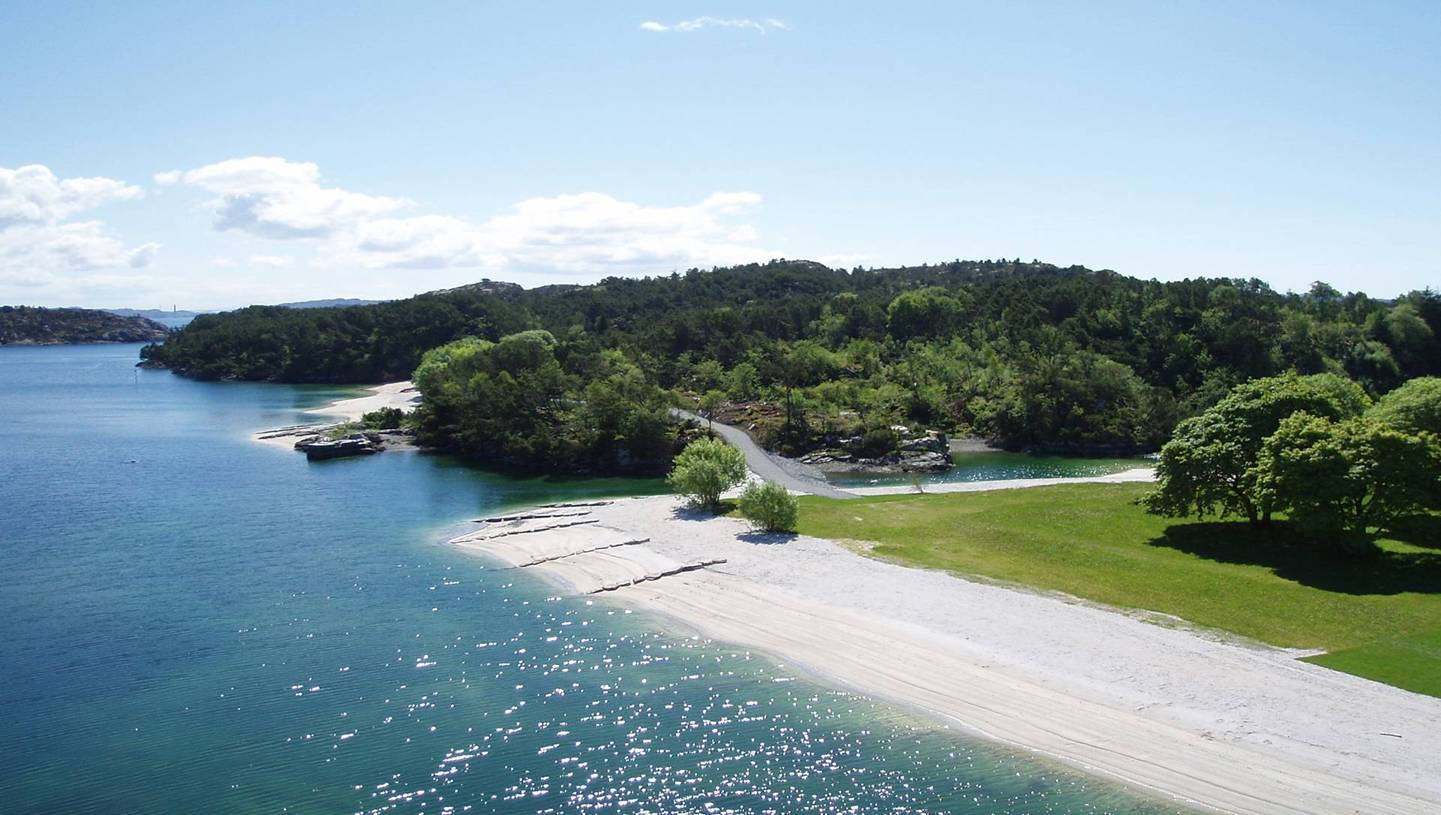
Kollevåg has one of Norway's most attractive beaches where The Lost Weekend festival was held.

Askøy is home to several sports teams. Askøy Fotballklub is an association football club, formed in 1999 by the merger of Florvåg Idrettsforening and Kleppestø Fotball. The club has a large number of teams, of which the majority are junior football teams. The men's senior team plays in the Norwegian third division as of 2008. The oldest sports club on the island is Ask Idrettslag, mainly an athletics club, founded in 1928.

The music festival Lost Weekend is held on the island every summer in Kollevågen. The festival, first held in August 2001, attracts a large number of minor Norwegian bands. The festival has been threatened by economic trouble several times.

In the village of Strusshamn are old wooden houses, dating back to the early 19th century. Strusshamn then served as a quarantine harbour for Bergen. Today, Strusshamn is one of the cultural capitals of Askøy, with a lot of activities and a museum of its own showing life on Askøy in earlier times.

== Geography ==
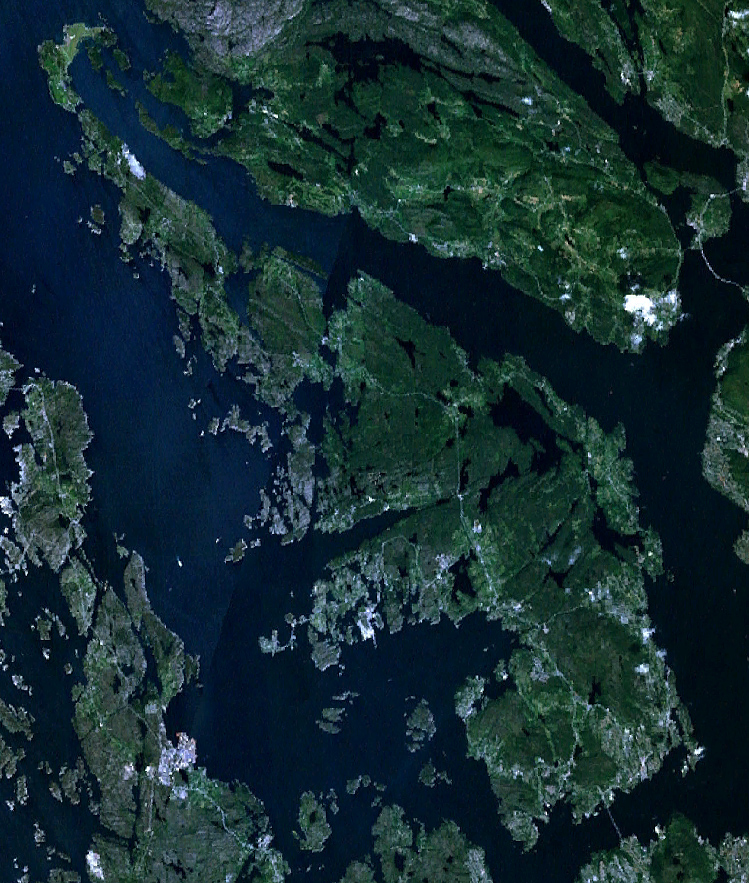
Satellite image of Askøy.

Askøy is an island municipality including the main island of Askøy and the minor island of Herdla as well as many small surrounding islands. The municipality is surrounded by three fjords: Hjeltefjorden to the west and north, Byfjorden to the east, and Herdlefjorden to the northeast. Askøy borders Alver Municipality to the northeast, Bergen Municipality to the east and south, and Øygarden Municipality to the west.

Askøy has one of the fastest growing populations in Norway due to an influx of new inhabitants from the Bergen, Midhordland and Nordhordland after the opening of the Askøy Bridge in 1992. North of Askøy lies the island of Herdla, a popular recreational area on the site of the disused German Herdla Airport from World War II.

The densely populated part of the municipality is on the south and eastern coasts. Kleppestø and Strusshamn are located on the southern coast and Florvåg is on the east coast. Florvåg was connected to downtown Bergen for many decades via ferries. The northern and western parts of the island are thinly populated.

There is a large lake on the southeast part of the island, called Askevatnet. The highest point in the municipality is the 231.03-metre (758.0 ft) tall mountain Kolbeinsvarden. The recreation area of Kollevågen lies in the western part of the island.

=== Settlements ===
Ask

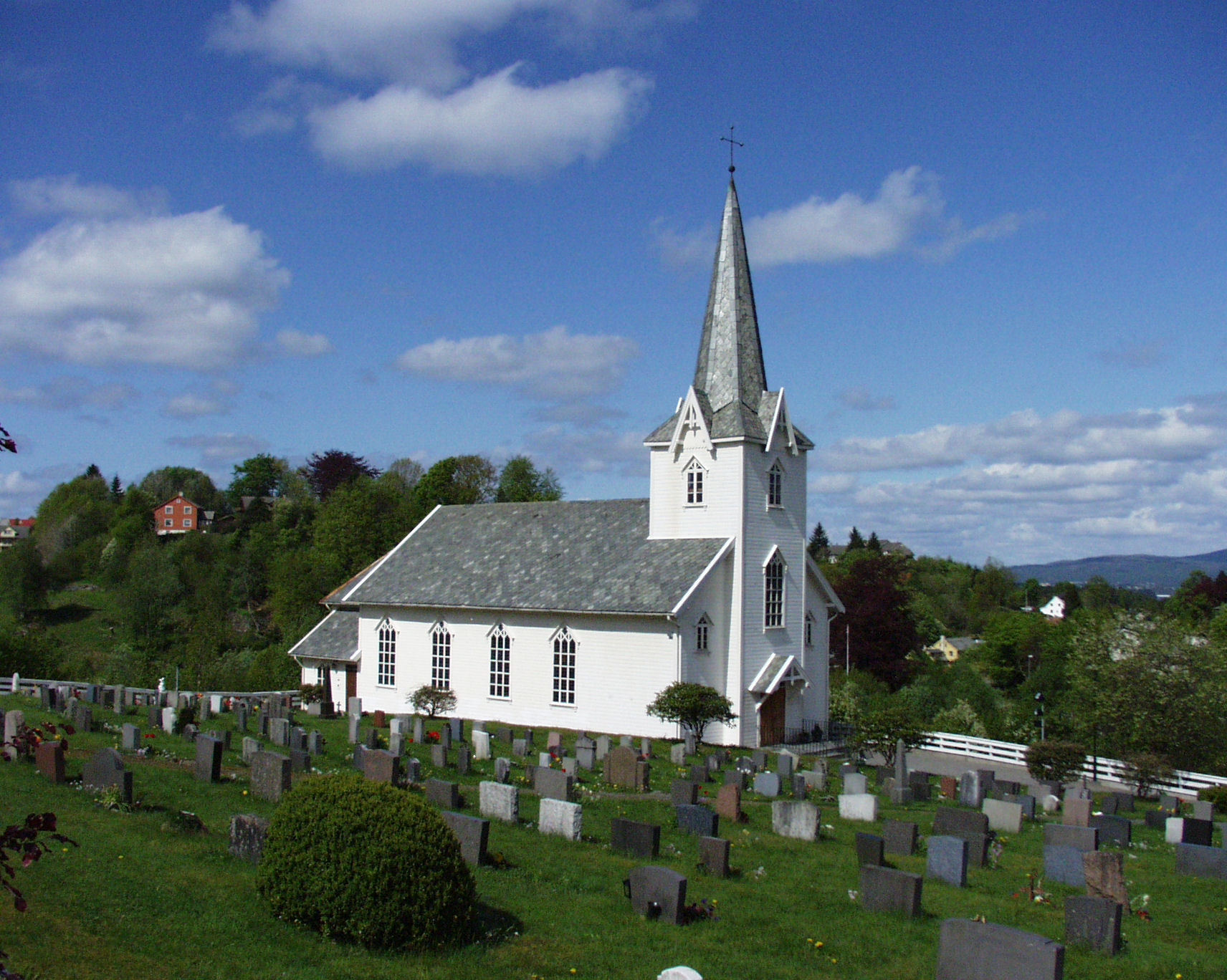
Ask Church

Ask is a village in the eastern part of Askøy. Due to its pleasant climate and its convenient location to Bergen, Ask was the location of a kongsgård (lit. "royal farm"); the very old Ask Church and churchyard was also located in Ask. The location where the church was situated from about 1200 until 1741 is today marked by a stone cross. Ask is the saga location for a famous dispute over inheritance between Egill Skallagrímsson and Berg-Önundr.

The local dialect of the village also reflects the close ties to Bergen, with the dialect being more similar to that of Bergen than that of the rest of Askøy except the dialect of Florvåg; the connection was reinforced into modern times as the wealthy merchants and other residents of Bergen spent their summer there. Ask has had famous residents up to recent times. Fridtjof Nansen lived in a house near Kongshaugen in a short period. Amalie Skram lived at Lien at Ask from 1876 to 1878.

Askøy

The large urban area of Askøy is located on the southern part of the island of Askøy.

Other settlements

Some of the other notable settlements in Askøy include Abbedisso, Erdal, Hanevik, Kleppestø, Skjelvika, and Tveitevåg.

== Population ==
Historical population
Year	1875	1890	1900	1910	1920	1930	1946	1951	1960	1970	1980	1990	2000	2010	2020	2023
Pop.	5,299	6,565	7,532	8,792	4,822	5,398	6,714	7,616	9,688	14,085	16,735	18,631	19,727	24,993	29,553	29,989
±% p.a.	—	+1.44%	+1.38%	+1.56%	−5.83%	+1.13%	+1.37%	+2.55%	+2.71%	+3.81%	+1.74%	+1.08%	+0.57%	+2.39%	+1.69%	+0.49%
Note: The municipal borders were changed in 1918 and 1964, causing a significant change in the population. Source: Statistics Norway and Norwegian Historical Data Centre

== Government ==
Askøy Municipality is responsible for primary education (through 10th grade), outpatient health services, senior citizen services, welfare and other social services, zoning, economic development, and municipal roads and utilities. The municipality is governed by a municipal council of directly elected representatives. The mayor is indirectly elected by a vote of the municipal council. The municipality is under the jurisdiction of the Hordaland District Court and the Gulating Court of Appeal.

=== Municipal council ===
The municipal council (Kommunestyre) of Askøy Municipality is made up of 35 representatives that are elected to four-year terms. The tables below show the current and historical composition of the council by political party.

Askøy kommunestyre 2023–2027
Party name (in Nynorsk)	Number of representatives
Labour Party (Arbeidarpartiet)	6
Progress Party (Framstegspartiet)	7
Green Party (Miljøpartiet Dei Grøne)	1
Conservative Party (Høgre)	10
Industry and Business Party (Industri‑ og Næringspartiet)	2
Christian Democratic Party (Kristeleg Folkeparti)	1
Pensioners' Party (Pensjonistpartiet)	1
Red Party (Raudt)	1
Socialist Left Party (Sosialistisk Venstreparti)	3
Liberal Party (Venstre)	1
Askøy List (Askøylisten)	2
Total number of members:	35

Askøy kommunestyre 2019–2023
Party name (in Norwegian)	Number of representatives
Labour Party (Arbeiderpartiet)	5
People's Action No to More Road Tolls (Folkeaksjonen nei til mer bompenger)	3
Progress Party (Fremskrittspartiet)	4
Green Party (Miljøpartiet De Grønne)	1
Conservative Party (Høyre)	8
Christian Democratic Party (Kristelig Folkeparti)	1
Pensioners' Party (Pensjonistpartiet)	2
Red Party (Rødt)	1
Centre Party (Senterpartiet)	2
Socialist Left Party (Sosialistisk Venstreparti)	2
Liberal Party (Venstre)	1
Askøy List (Askøylisten)	5
Total number of members:	35

Askøy kommunestyre 2015–2019
Party name (in Norwegian)	Number of representatives
Labour Party (Arbeiderpartiet)	11
Progress Party (Fremskrittspartiet)	4
Green Party (Miljøpartiet De Grønne)	1
Conservative Party (Høyre)	8
Christian Democratic Party (Kristelig Folkeparti)	2
The Democrats (Demokratene)	1
Red Party (Rødt)	1
Socialist Left Party (Sosialistisk Venstreparti)	2
Liberal Party (Venstre)	2
Askøy List (Askøylisten)	3
Total number of members:	35

Askøy kommunestyre 2011–2015
Party name (in Norwegian)	Number of representatives
Labour Party (Arbeiderpartiet)	11
Progress Party (Fremskrittspartiet)	6
Conservative Party (Høyre)	11
Christian Democratic Party (Kristelig Folkeparti)	2
The Democrats (Demokratene)	2
Socialist Left Party (Sosialistisk Venstreparti)	1
Liberal Party (Venstre)	2
Total number of members:	35

Askøy kommunestyre 2007–2011
Party name (in Norwegian)	Number of representatives
Labour Party (Arbeiderpartiet)	10
Progress Party (Fremskrittspartiet)	11
Conservative Party (Høyre)	7
Christian Democratic Party (Kristelig Folkeparti)	2
The Democrats (Demokratene)	1
Socialist Left Party (Sosialistisk Venstreparti)	3
Liberal Party (Venstre)	1
Total number of members:	35

Askøy kommunestyre 2003–2007
Party name (in Norwegian)	Number of representatives
Labour Party (Arbeiderpartiet)	12
Progress Party (Fremskrittspartiet)	9
Conservative Party (Høyre)	5
Christian Democratic Party (Kristelig Folkeparti)	2
Socialist Left Party (Sosialistisk Venstreparti)	5
Liberal Party (Venstre)	1
Non-party election list (Upolitisk valglist)	1
Total number of members:	35

Askøy kommunestyre 1999–2003
Party name (in Norwegian)	Number of representatives
Labour Party (Arbeiderpartiet)	13
Progress Party (Fremskrittspartiet)	7
Conservative Party (Høyre)	7
Christian Democratic Party (Kristelig Folkeparti)	6
Socialist Left Party (Sosialistisk Venstreparti)	7
Liberal Party (Venstre)	1
Non-party election list (Upolitisk valglist)	2
Total number of members:	43

Askøy kommunestyre 1995–1999
Party name (in Norwegian)	Number of representatives
Labour Party (Arbeiderpartiet)	15
Progress Party (Fremskrittspartiet)	5
Conservative Party (Høyre)	7
Christian Democratic Party (Kristelig Folkeparti)	7
Centre Party (Senterpartiet)	1
Socialist Left Party (Sosialistisk Venstreparti)	2
Liberal Party (Venstre)	3
Non-party election list (Upolitisk Valgliste)	2
Alternative election list for sports and culture (Alternativ valgliste for idrett og kultur)	1
Total number of members:	43

Askøy kommunestyre 1991–1995
Party name (in Norwegian)	Number of representatives
Labour Party (Arbeiderpartiet)	11
Progress Party (Fremskrittspartiet)	4
Conservative Party (Høyre)	11
Christian Democratic Party (Kristelig Folkeparti)	4
Pensioners' Party (Pensjonistpartiet)	1
Centre Party (Senterpartiet)	1
Socialist Left Party (Sosialistisk Venstreparti)	6
Liberal Party (Venstre)	2
Non-party election list (Upolitisk Valgliste)	3
Total number of members:	43

Askøy kommunestyre 1987–1991
Party name (in Norwegian)	Number of representatives
Labour Party (Arbeiderpartiet)	14
Progress Party (Fremskrittspartiet)	6
Conservative Party (Høyre)	8
Christian Democratic Party (Kristelig Folkeparti)	5
Socialist Left Party (Sosialistisk Venstreparti)	3
Liberal Party (Venstre)	3
Non-party election list (Upolitisk Valgliste)	4
Total number of members:	43

Askøy kommunestyre 1983–1987
Party name (in Norwegian)	Number of representatives
Labour Party (Arbeiderpartiet)	10
Progress Party (Fremskrittspartiet)	3
Conservative Party (Høyre)	10
Christian Democratic Party (Kristelig Folkeparti)	7
Centre Party (Senterpartiet)	3
Socialist Left Party (Sosialistisk Venstreparti)	1
Liberal Party (Venstre)	1
Total number of members:	43

Askøy kommunestyre 1979–1983
Party name (in Norwegian)	Number of representatives
Labour Party (Arbeiderpartiet)	12
Conservative Party (Høyre)	12
Christian Democratic Party (Kristelig Folkeparti)	5
New People's Party (Nye Folkepartiet)	1
Centre Party (Senterpartiet)	1
Socialist Left Party (Sosialistisk Venstreparti)	1
Liberal Party (Venstre)	9
Non-party election list (Upolitisk Valgliste)	2
Total number of members:	43

Askøy kommunestyre 1975–1979
Party name (in Norwegian)	Number of representatives
Labour Party (Arbeiderpartiet)	14
Conservative Party (Høyre)	9
Christian Democratic Party (Kristelig Folkeparti)	7
New People's Party (Nye Folkepartiet)	4
Socialist Left Party (Sosialistisk Venstreparti)	1
Liberal Party (Venstre)	5
Non-party election list (Upolitisk Valgliste)	3
Total number of members:	43

Askøy kommunestyre 1971–1975
Party name (in Norwegian)	Number of representatives
Labour Party (Arbeiderpartiet)	19
Conservative Party (Høyre)	4
Christian Democratic Party (Kristelig Folkeparti)	7
Liberal Party (Venstre)	11
Local List(s) (Lokale lister)	2
Total number of members:	43

Askøy kommunestyre 1967–1971
Party name (in Norwegian)	Number of representatives
Labour Party (Arbeiderpartiet)	19
Conservative Party (Høyre)	4
Christian Democratic Party (Kristelig Folkeparti)	6
Socialist People's Party (Sosialistisk Folkeparti)	2
Liberal Party (Venstre)	12
Total number of members:	43

Askøy kommunestyre 1963–1967
Party name (in Norwegian)	Number of representatives
Labour Party (Arbeiderpartiet)	21
Conservative Party (Høyre)	4
Christian Democratic Party (Kristelig Folkeparti)	6
Socialist People's Party (Sosialistisk Folkeparti)	1
Liberal Party (Venstre)	9
Local List(s) (Lokale lister)	2
Total number of members:	43

Askøy herredsstyre 1959–1963
Party name (in Norwegian)	Number of representatives
Labour Party (Arbeiderpartiet)	14
Conservative Party (Høyre)	2
Christian Democratic Party (Kristelig Folkeparti)	4
Liberal Party (Venstre)	7
Local List(s) (Lokale lister)	2
Total number of members:	29

Askøy herredsstyre 1955–1959
Party name (in Norwegian)	Number of representatives
Labour Party (Arbeiderpartiet)	10
Conservative Party (Høyre)	2
Christian Democratic Party (Kristelig Folkeparti)	5
Liberal Party (Venstre)	5
Local List(s) (Lokale lister)	7
Total number of members:	29

Askøy herredsstyre 1951–1955
Party name (in Norwegian)	Number of representatives
Labour Party (Arbeiderpartiet)	7
Christian Democratic Party (Kristelig Folkeparti)	4
Liberal Party (Venstre)	3
Local List(s) (Lokale lister)	10
Total number of members:	24

Askøy herredsstyre 1947–1951
Party name (in Norwegian)	Number of representatives
Labour Party (Arbeiderpartiet)	3
Christian Democratic Party (Kristelig Folkeparti)	4
Liberal Party (Venstre)	2
Local List(s) (Lokale lister)	7
Total number of members:	16

Askøy herredsstyre 1945–1947
Party name (in Norwegian)	Number of representatives
Labour Party (Arbeiderpartiet)	5
Christian Democratic Party (Kristelig Folkeparti)	4
Liberal Party (Venstre)	3
Local List(s) (Lokale lister)	4
Total number of members:	16

Askøy herredsstyre 1937–1941*
Party name (in Norwegian)	Number of representatives
Labour Party (Arbeiderpartiet)	5
Liberal Party (Venstre)	5
Joint List(s) of Non-Socialist Parties (Borgerlige Felleslister)	1
Local List(s) (Lokale lister)	5
Total number of members:	16
Note: Due to the German occupation of Norway during World War II, no elections were held for new municipal councils until after the war ended in 1945.

=== Mayors ===
The mayor (Nynorsk: ordførar) of Askøy Municipality is the political leader of the municipality and the chairperson of the municipal council. Here is a list of people who have held this position:

- 1838–1843: Lars Simonsen
- 1844–1844: Magne Magnesen
- 1844–1847: Jacob Andersen
- 1848–1849: Ole Andreas Olsen
- 1850–1853: Jacob Andersen
- 1854–1855: Ole Andreas Olsen
- 1856–1857: Haldor Johannessen
- 1858–1860: Nils Beer
- 1861–1861: Ole Sørensen
- 1861–1861: Olavus Krøger
- 1864–1867: Wollert Ludvig Hille
- 1868–1885: Nils Jørgensen
- 1886–1887: Bernt Ulrik August Müller
- 1887–1887: Jacob Neumann Janson
- 1888–1891: Anton Olsen
- 1892–1895: Jonas Rein Simonsen
- 1896–1901: Nils Andreas Tollevsen Scheie
- 1902–1915: Johan Berentsen
- 1916–1917: Andreas Andersen
- 1918–1922: Daniel Fluge
- 1923–1925: Martin Monstad
- 1926–1928: Jens Monstad
- 1929–1929: Ole Larsen (H)
- 1929–1931: Sigvald Waagen
- 1932–1945: Martin Monstad
- 1946–1946: Oluf Holgersen
- 1946–1947: Erling Juvik
- 1948–1951: Nils Eriksen
- 1952–1959: Daniel Stien
- 1960–1967: Olav Bjørkaas (Ap)
- 1968–1975: Johan Sørensen (V)
- 1976–1977: Mons Espelid (V)
- 1978–1979: Jan Mikkelsen (H)
- 1980–1981: Mons Espelid (V)
- 1982–1983: Kåre Minde (H)
- 1984–1987: Otto Per Paulsen (Ap)
- 1988–1989: Øyvind Fluge (KrF)
- 1990–1993: Oddvard Nilsen (H)
- 1994–1999: Øyvind Fluge (KrF)
- 1999–2007: Kari Manger (Ap)
- 2007–2011: Knut Hanselmann (FrP)
- 2011–2015: Siv Høgtun (H)
- 2015–2019: Terje Mathiassen (Ap)
- 2019–2023: Siv Høgtun (H)
- 2023–present: Yngve Fosse (H)

== Industry and trade ==
Askøy is well known for the strawberries from Ask. The seafood industry is also well settled at Askøy.

Askøy also houses several boat building companies; the most famous of which are Viksund Yachts of Norway situated in Strusshamn, Viknes situated in Bakarvågen, Selby situated in Strusshamn and NB Marine situated at Herdla.

Askøy houses some big industrial facilities such as Hanøytangen, Mjølkeviksvarden, and Storebotn.

== Notable people ==
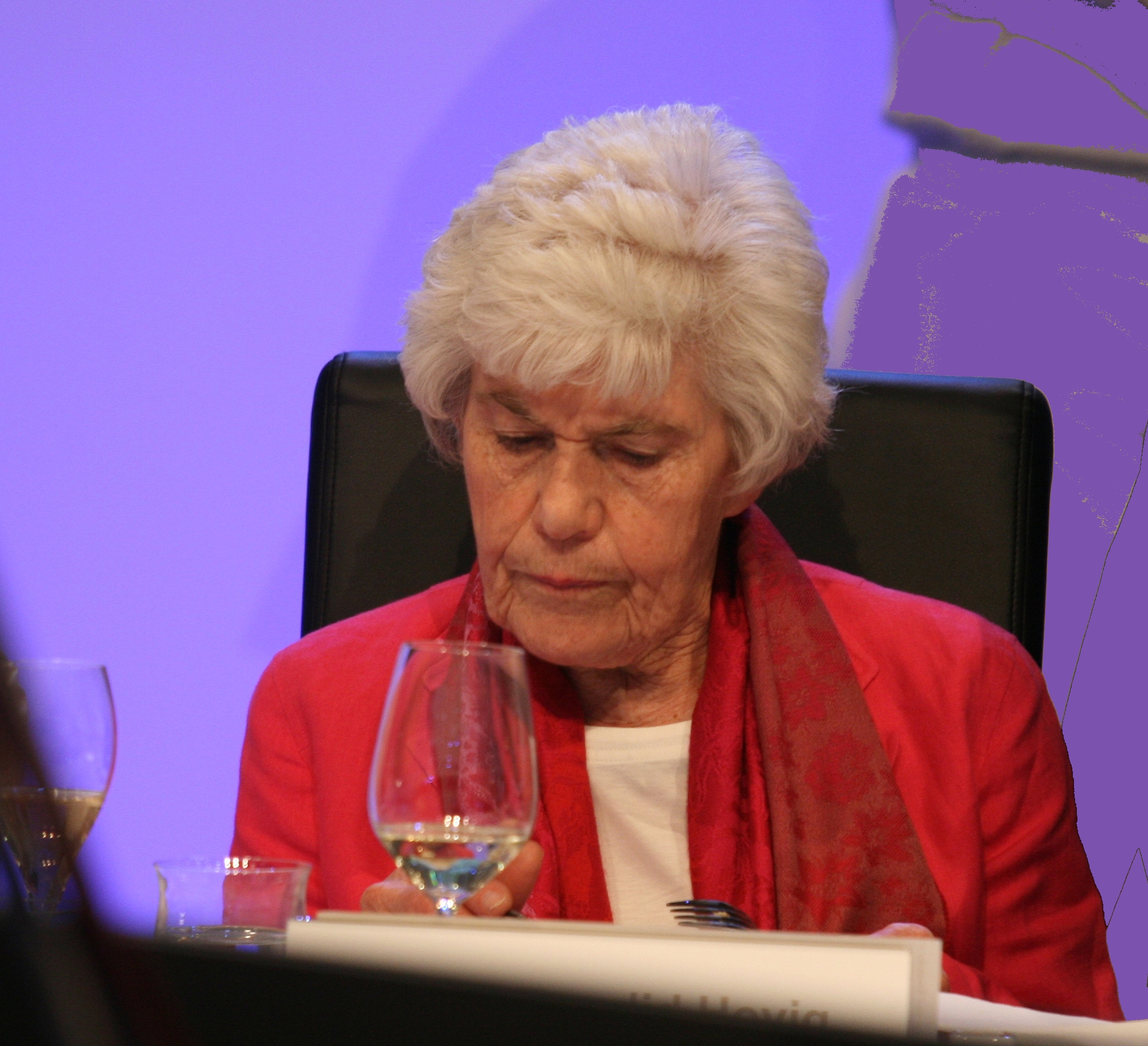
Ingrid Espelid, 2008

- Knut Robberstad (1899 in Askøy – 1981), a jurist, philologist, and academic
- Halldor Espelid (1920 in Askøy – 1944), a Supermarine Spitfire pilot who escaped from Stalag Luft III, was re-captured and shot by the Gestapo
- Ingrid Espelid Hovig (1924 in Askøy – 2018), a television chef and author of cook books
- Arne Tumyr (born 1933), a former journalist, newspaper editor, and politician who grew up in Ask
- Geir Magnus Nyborg (1951 in Askøy – 2018), a media scholar and theologian

=== Sport ===
- Trygve Andersen (born 1934 in Askøy), a retired footballer with 27 caps for Norway
- Martin Jensen (1942 in Askøy – 2016), a triple jumper
- Frode Syvertsen (born 1963 in Askøy), a speed skater who competed at the 1988 Winter Olympics
- Casper Stornes, a 2025 Ironman Champion

== See also ==
- Askøy (island)
