= Ask, Vestland =

Village in Askøy Municipality, Norway

Ask
- Village
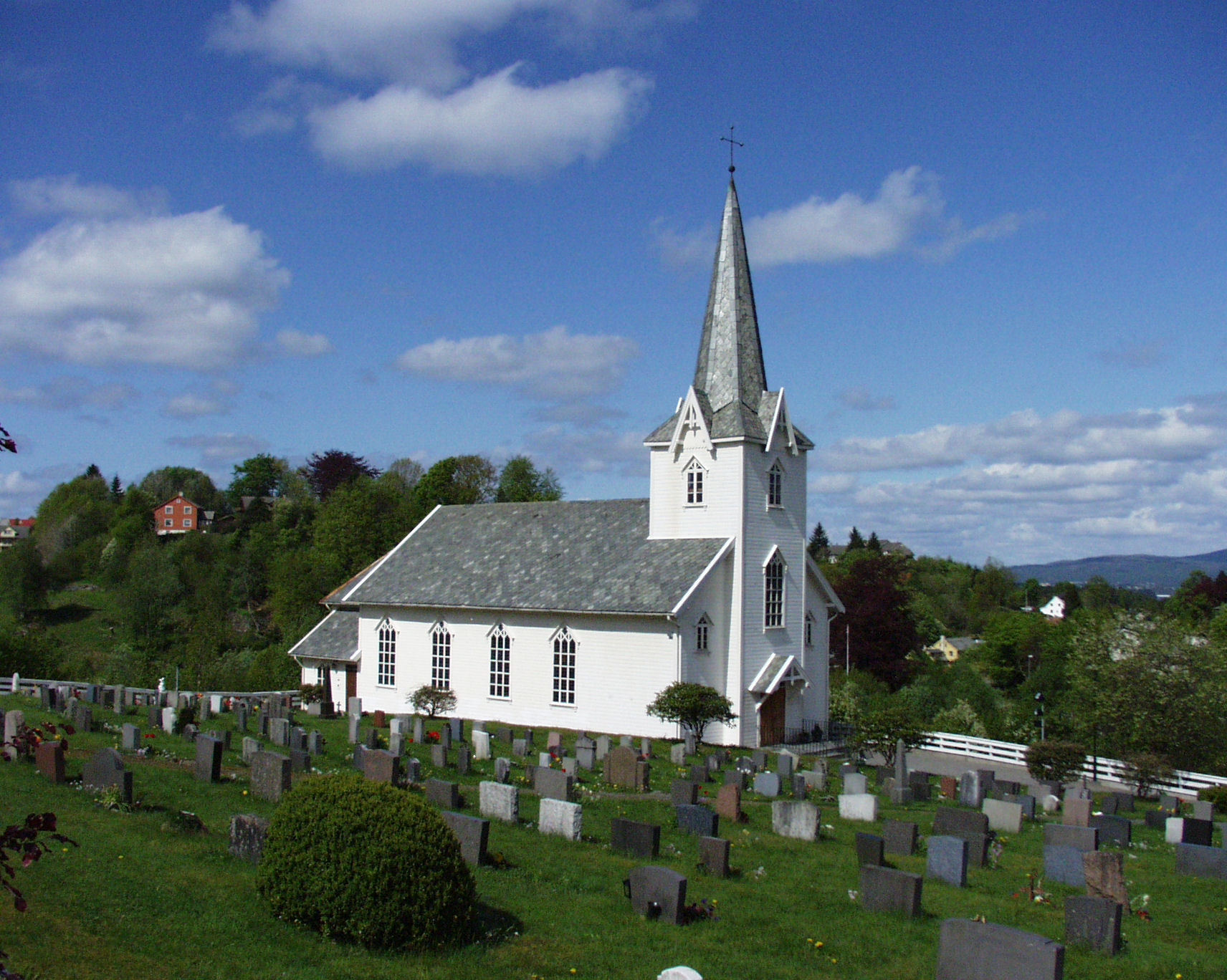
- View of the church in the centre of the village
- Interactive map of Ask
- Coordinates: 60.47417°N 5.21414°E
- Country: Norway
- Region: Western Norway
- County: Vestland
- District: Midhordland
- Municipality: Askøy Municipality

Area
  - Total: 1.5 km^{2} (0.58 sq mi)
- Elevation: 42 m (138 ft)

Population (2019)
  - Total: 1,562
  - Density: 1,041/km^{2} (2,700/sq mi)
- Time zone: UTC+01:00 (CET)
  - Summer (DST): UTC+02:00 (CEST)
- Post Code: 5307 Ask

Ask is a small village in the eastern part of Askøy Municipality in Vestland county, Norway. The village lies along the Byfjorden on the eastern shore of the island of Askøy. The village of Ask is well known for the farming of strawberries which are sold in the marketplace in the nearby city of Bergen during the summer season.

The 1.5-square-kilometre (370-acre) village had a population (2019) of 1,562 and a population density of 1,041 inhabitants per square kilometre (2,700/sq mi). Since 2019, the population and area data for this village area has not been separately tracked by Statistics Norway.

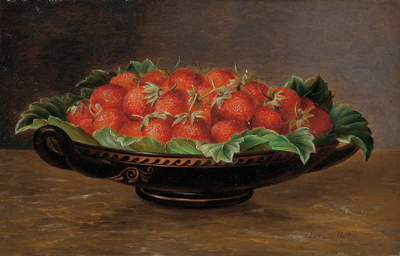
Ask is known for its strawberries

Due to its pleasant climate and its location on an island near Bergen, Ask was the location of a kongsgård (i.e., royal farm – the Norwegian equivalent of a palace estate). Ask gård (literally Ask farm), with the farm number 1, was the basis for the name of the island of Askøy. This was also the site of the extremely old church and churchyard which was in use from around the year 1200 until 1741. Today the old church site is marked by a stone cross. A newer Ask Church was built in the centre of Ask in 1741.

The local dialect of the village also reflects the continuing close tie to Bergen, with the dialect being more similar to that of Bergen than that of the rest of Askøy; the connection was reinforced into modern times as the wealthy merchants and other residents of Bergen summered there.

The village of Ask is the saga location for a famous dispute over inheritance between Egill Skallagrímsson and Berg-Önundr. When Berg-Önundr refused to allow Egill to claim his wife Ásgerðr's share of her father's inheritance, Egill challenged Önundr to a holmgang.

Ask has had famous residents up to recent times. Fridtjof Nansen lived in a house near Kongshaugen in a short period. Amalie Skram lived at Lien at Ask, near Ask Dambruk, from 1876 to 1878, in the same house where the headmaster, Nils Peder Åland, lived for 40 years.

== Older history ==
The legendary Scandinavian hero and skald whose adventures are retold in Gesta Danorum and in the legendary sagas, Starkad, as well as Egil Skallagrimson of historic saga fame and the last Catholic Archbishop in Norway, Olav Engelbrektsson, Archbishop of Nidaros, have connections to Ask.

The sagas mention Ask as early as the 6th century. King Hertjov of Hordaland traveled to Agder and took with him two boys named Stakard and Vikar. As was common in the period, he asked Grane, who held the land (farm) of Ask, to raise these boys. As they grew, they became great hunters and warriors. As warriors, the boys revenged attacks on Ask by Vikings from Hordaland, who had robbed villages in Agder. Ask became their new home until Vikar was killed by an accident. After this, Stakard had to leave the country. He was known in Denmark and Sweden.

Egils saga tells that in the 9th century, Torgeir Tyrnefot owned Ask. His son was Berg Onund. Berg Onund was killed in an attack led by Egil Skallagrimson, one of the most powerful men on Iceland. As revenge for a miscarriage in inheritance in around 960, Egil travel with his men through Herdlafjorden and to Ask, where they arrive at the farm, killing 15 or 16 men and pillaging.

The first church in Askøy was most probably built at the pagan sacrifice mountain located at Ask.

Archbishop Olav Engelbrektsson was the last Catholic bishop in Norway. His final residence was in Bergen and as the Reformation spread throughout Norway in 1534, he took refuge at Ask.

Mauritz Bostede bought Ask in 1628. Other well-known men from Bergen have also owned Ask for extended periods. Thomas Ericssen built a large house in the area and Thomas Ericssen Minde from 1795 is the only building at Askøy from that period that is preserved today.

== Later history ==
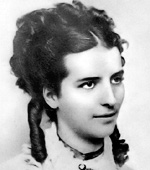
Amalie Müller (Later known as Amalie Skram) was living for some years at Ask

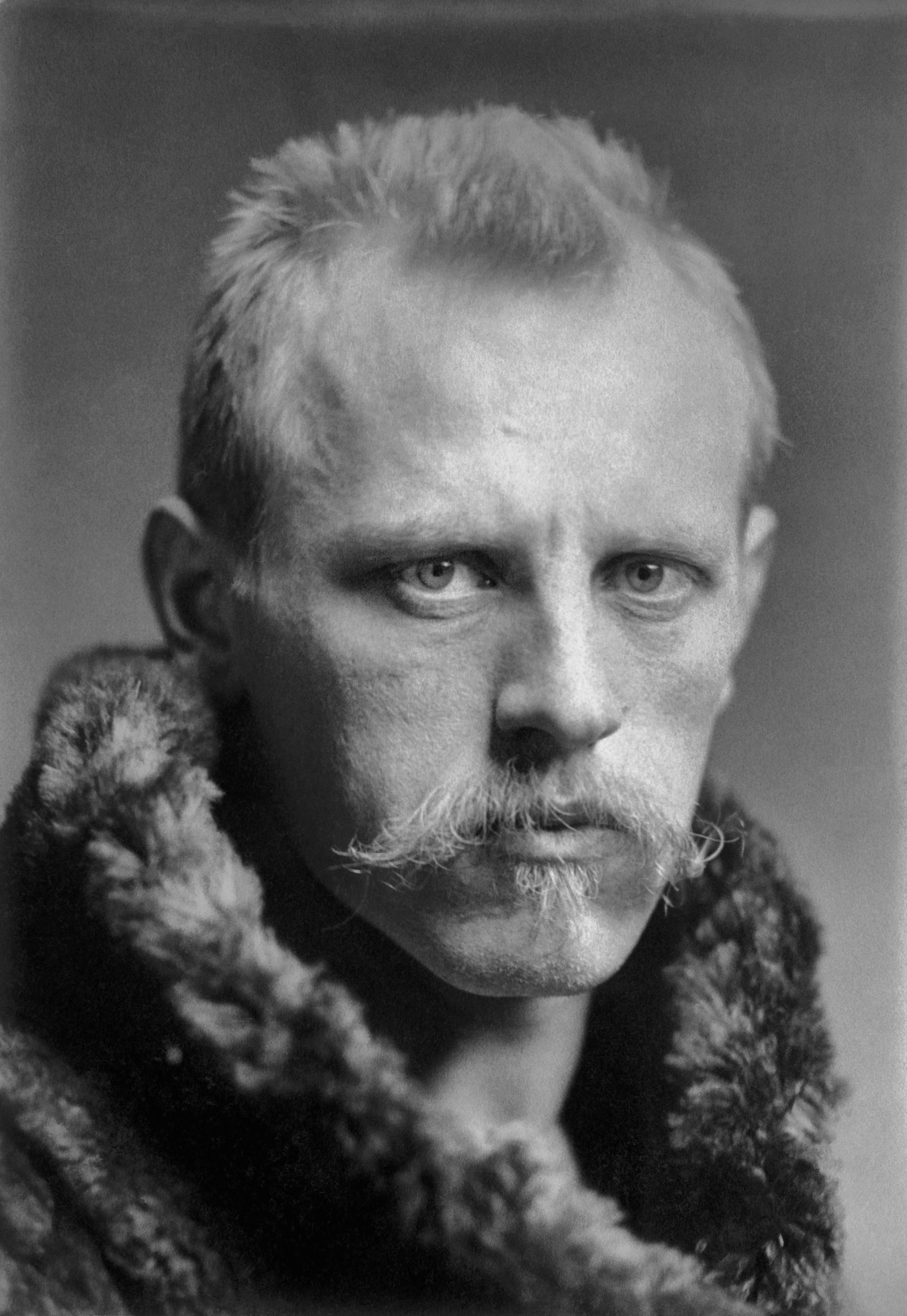
Fridtjof Nansen lived in a house at Kongshaugen at Ask

Since Ask is located only 4 kilometres (2.5 mi) northwest of Bergen (across the Byfjorden), around the years 1880-1890 there was a resurgence in the popularity of Ask as a vacation destination from Bergen. As a result, there were increases in commercial cargo and passenger transport by steamboat. The "Fridtjof" was one of the boats that went into between Ask and Bergen.

When the road to Kleppestø was constructed around 1950, the traffic at the Ask harbour decreased.

The writer, Amalie Skram's first husband, Captain Bernt Ulrik August Müller, bought a watermill in the area and they lived there for some years.

Emanuel Jæger started commercial strawberry production. He sent his strawberries to Fleischer's Hotel at Vossevangen. The strawberries were of the German type "Sieger" (victory) and these was very popular throughout the area in the last century.

== Geography ==
Ask is located on the eastern part of the island of Askøy. The Herdlefjorden is located to the east of the village and the Nordhordland Bridge is visible from the village. The lake Askevatnet and extensive forests are located in the area west of Ask.

== Cultural arrangements ==
On May Day each year, the Ask-relay is held. In 2006 the relay celebrated its 54th running.
