= Tveit Church =

Tveit Church may refer to:

- Tveit Church (Agder), a church in Kristiansand municipality in Agder county, Norway
- Tveit Church (Vestland), a church in Askøy municipality in Vestland county, Norway

== See also ==
- Austad Church (Bygland), a church in the village of Tveit in Bygland municipality in Agder county, Norway
