= Einar O. Hausvik & Co =

Former Norwegian cannery on Askøy

- Company type: Aksjeselskap
- Industry: Fish canning
- Founded: 1914
- Founder: Einar O. Hausvik
- Defunct: 1975
- Fate: Closed; building now a cultural center
- Headquarters: Hetlevik, Askøy, Norway
- Products: Canned fish

Einar O. Hausvik & Co was a cannery at Hetlevik on Askøy, Norway, established in 1914 and producing various fish products. It employed up to 150 people and was important to the local community, but was taken over by a bank in 1937 amid the interwar downturn and later absorbed into the sardine-canning group De Forente Hermetikkfabrikker. The factory closed in 1975, and after extensive restoration the building is now Askøy's largest cultural center.
