= Askøy =

Village in Askøy Municipality, Norway

- Urban area
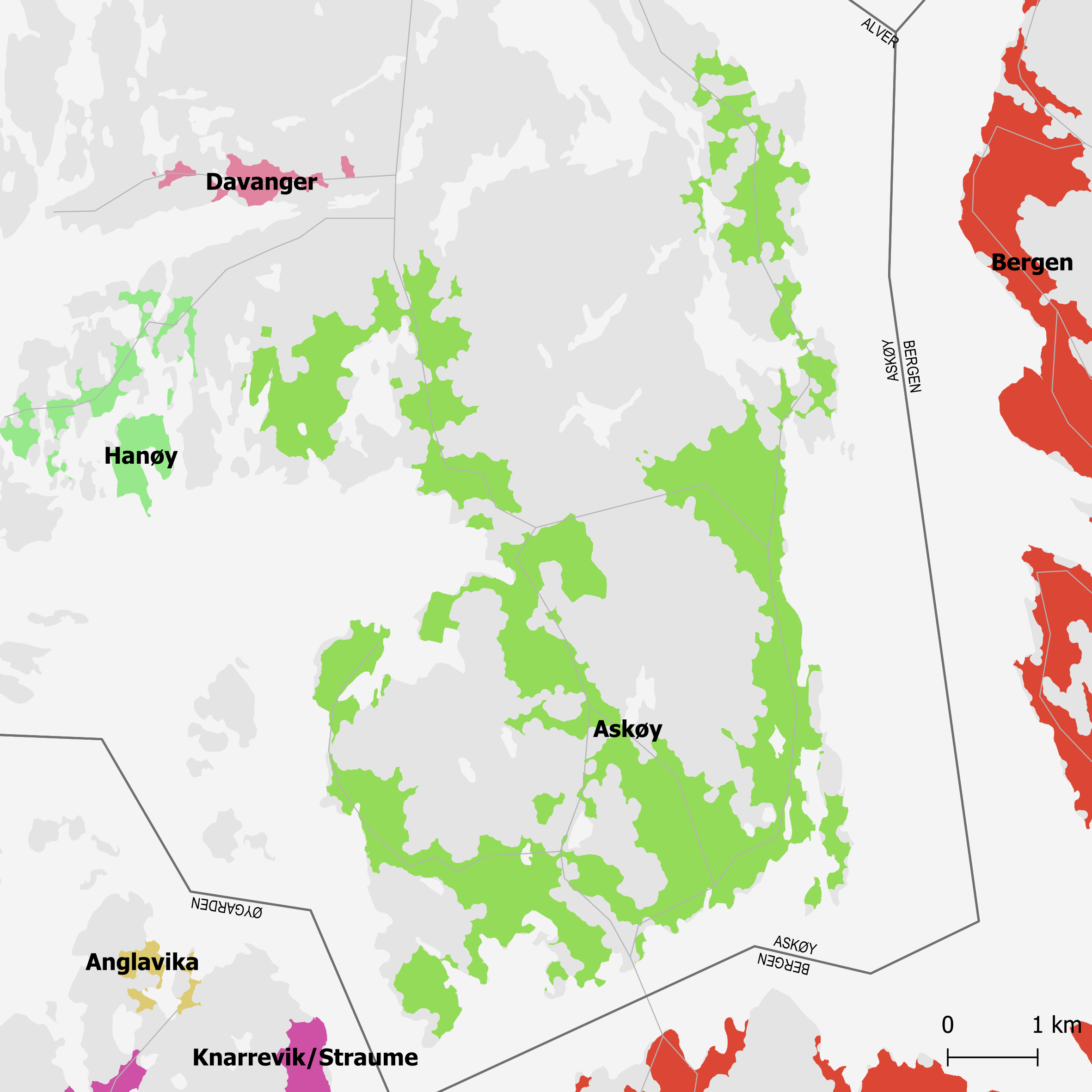
- Map of the urban area (in green)
- Interactive map of Askøy
- Coordinates: 60.40842°N 5.22436°E
- Country: Norway
- Region: Western Norway
- County: Vestland
- District: Midhordland
- Municipality: Askøy Municipality

Area
  - Total: 15.23 km^{2} (5.88 sq mi)
- Elevation: 20 m (66 ft)

Population (2025)
  - Total: 24,660
  - Density: 1,619/km^{2} (4,190/sq mi)
- Time zone: UTC+01:00 (CET)
  - Summer (DST): UTC+02:00 (CEST)
- Post Code: 5300 Kleppestø

Askøy is an urban area in Askøy Municipality in Vestland county, Norway. The urban area is located on the southern part of the island of Askøy. The urban area encompasses several larger villages that have all grown together via conurbation. The urban area includes the villages of (clockwise from the east coast of the island of Askøy): Ask, Erdal, Florvåg, Kleppestø, Strusshamn, Marikoven, Follese, Hetlevik, Juvik, Ravnanger, and Tveitevåg.

The 15.23-square-kilometre (3,760-acre) village has a population (2025) of 24,660 and a population density of 1,619 inhabitants per square kilometre (4,190/sq mi).
