= Thomas Erichsens Minde =

Building in Askøy, Hordaland, Norway

Coordinates: 60°28′18″N 5°12′42″E

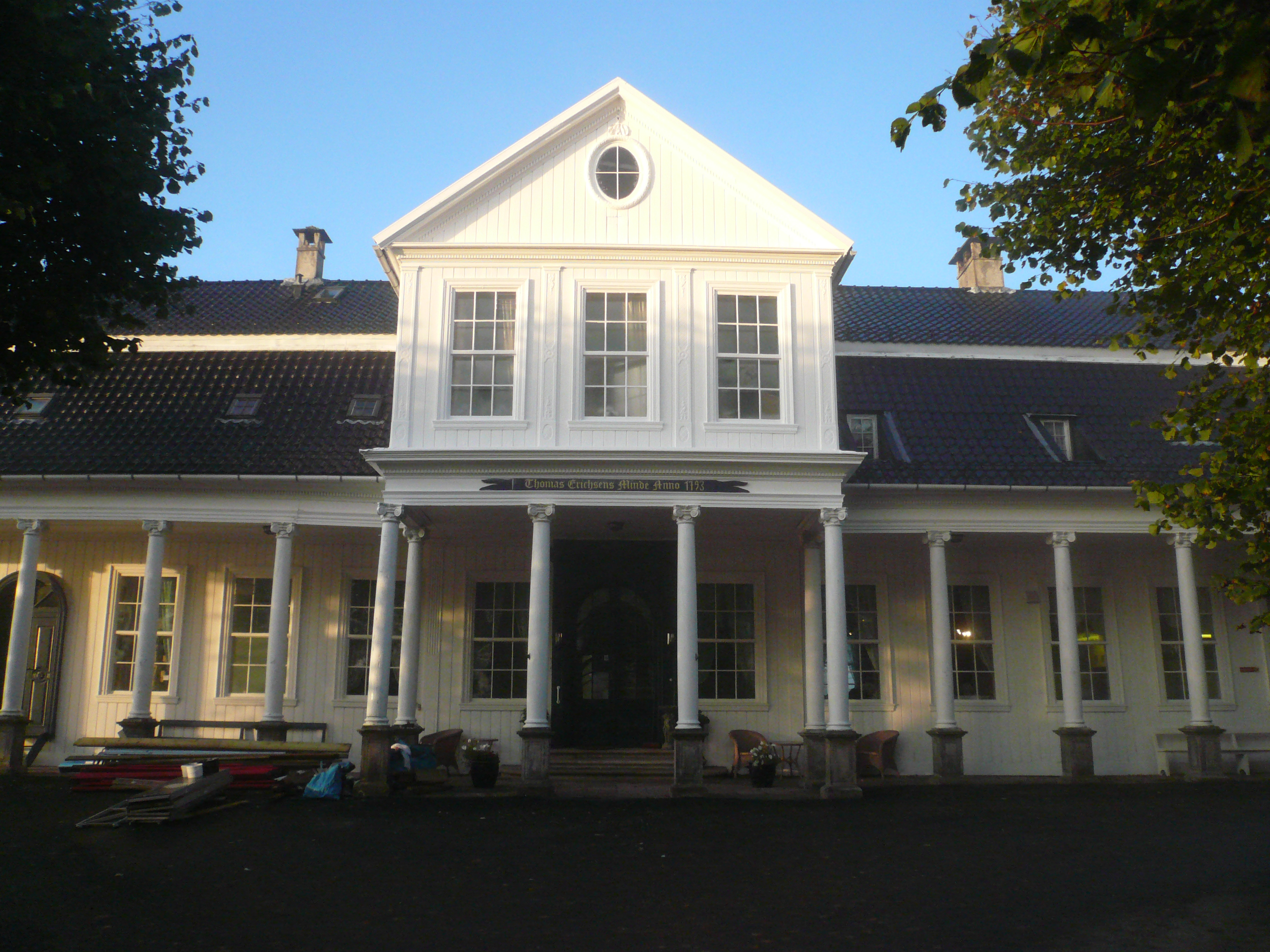
Thomas Erichsens Minde entrance

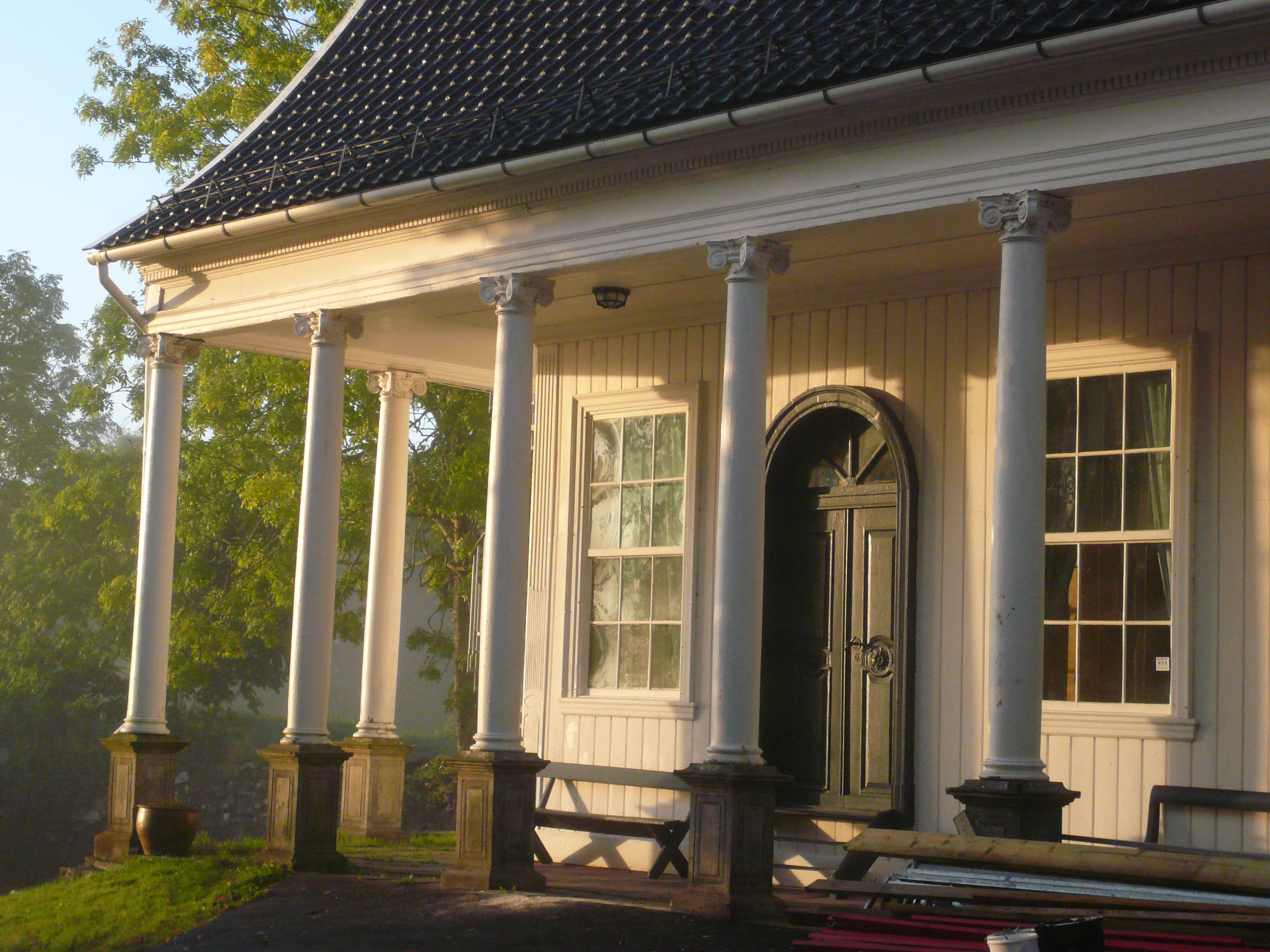
Ionic columns at Thomas Erichsens Minde

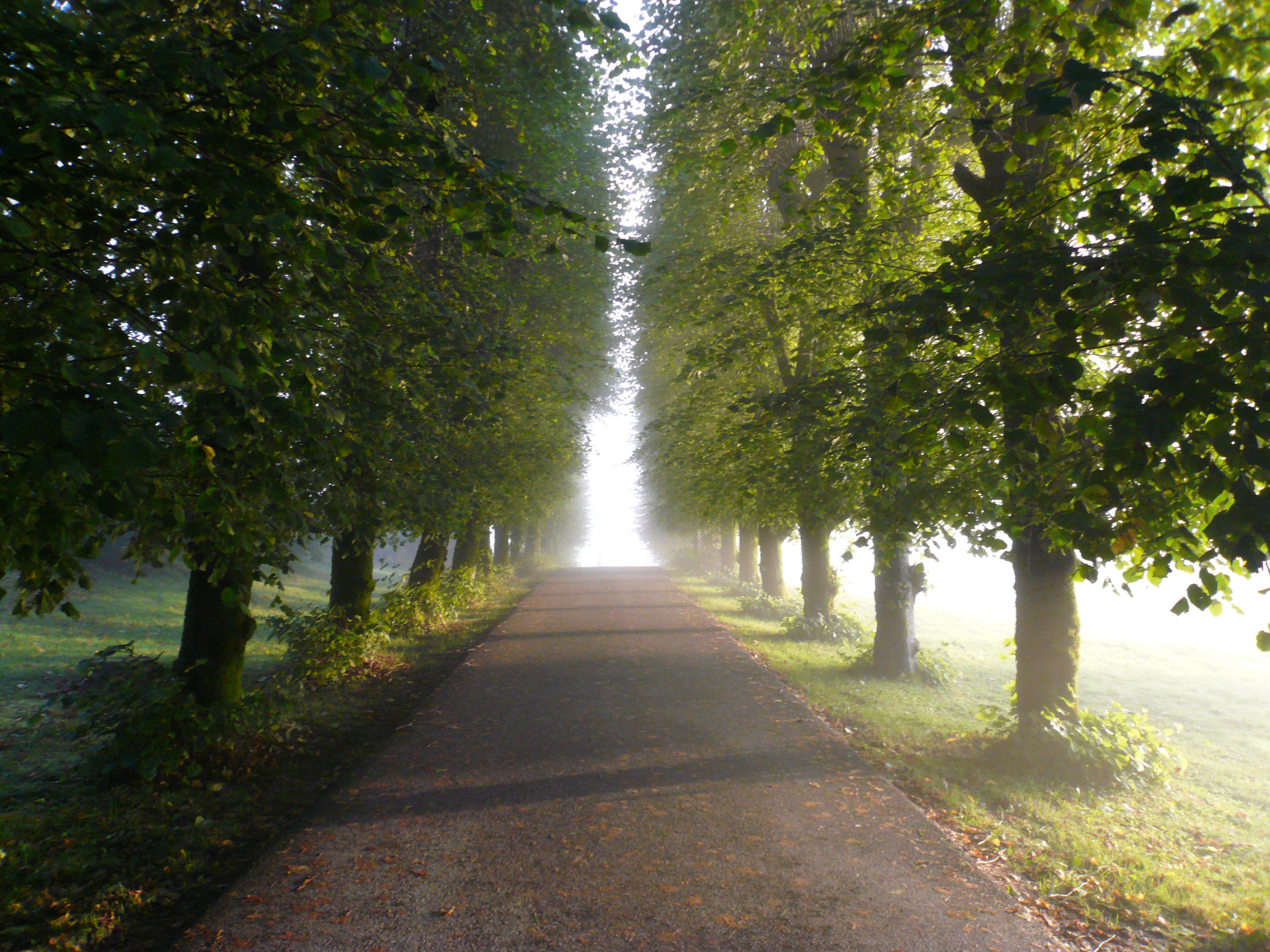
Linden trees at Thomas Erichsens Minde

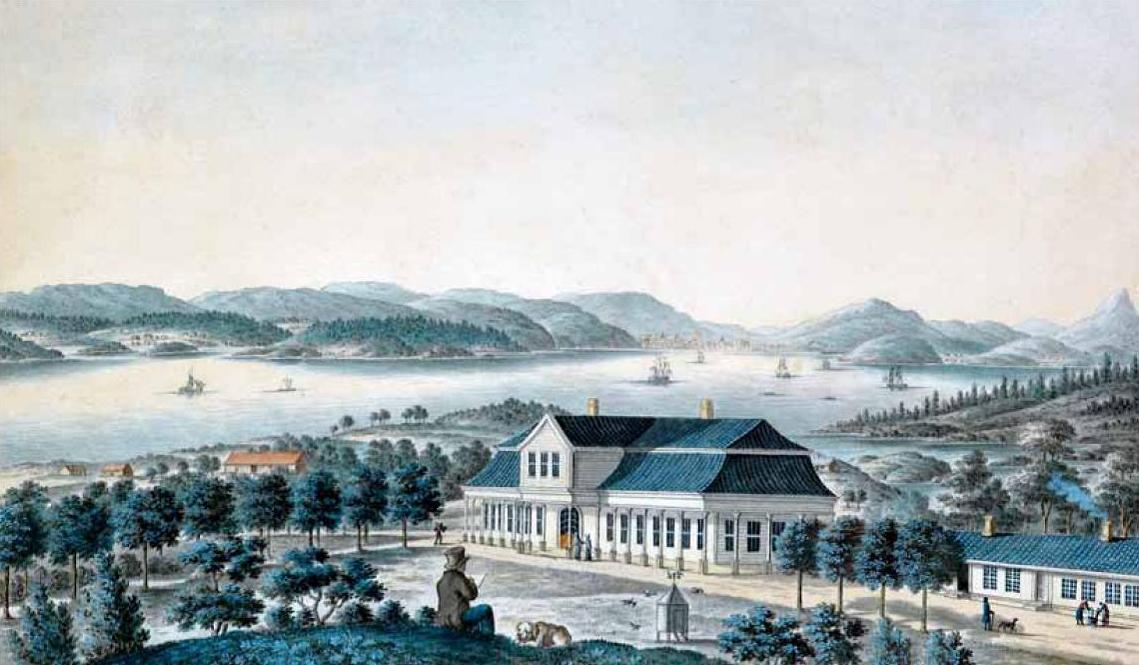
Thomas Erichsens Minde by Johan F. L. Dreier (1810)

Thomas Erichsens Minde is a landmark estate and Manor house located on the isle of Askøy in Vestland county, Norway.

== Hop Farm ==
Starting in the 1500s, Hop Farm (Hop hovedgård) was the seat of the magistrate of Bergen and Evindvig. The farm was in 1651 taken over by the mayor and the presiding judge Hans Hansen Smidt (ca. 1610–1681), who was ennobled in 1676 with the name of Lilienskiold. His son, Hans Hansen Lilienskiold, Governor of Finnmark, took possession over both the noble title and the estate after his father. During the period of 1703–1737, the farm was owned by Minister Niels Knagh (1661-1737), later ennobled with the name of Knagenhielm. He was among the richest men of Western Norway and the land owner of vast areas in Kaupanger. The farm was subsequently inherited by Justice Christian Krogh.

== Thomas Erichsen ==
In 1792 the property was bought by Thomas Erichsen (1752-1795), a merchant from Flensburg in Schleswig-Holstein. He had become one of the richest men in Bergen. Between 1793 and his death in 1795, he built the main building in Louis XVI style and also built a magnificent garden with an 800 meter long avenue down to Hop harbor. The lower section of the avenue consists of ash trees, while further up it is linden trees.

== Heritage ==
Thomas Erichsen Minde was protected by the Cultural Heritage Act in 1923. The property was in 1932 taken over by A/S Ask Health Home. The main building has an annex to the northwest which was designed by Molden Architects. Midthordland Inner Mission (Midthordland Indremisjon) took over Thomas Erichsen Memorial in 1971, and operated a retirement and nursing home on the property for 40 years until 2010. At that time, the property was sold to investors as a potential meeting and conference center.
