= Kollevågen =

Nude beach in Norway

Coordinates: 60°26′52″N 5°6′57″E

Kollevågen (Norwegian: Kollevåg friluftsområde) is a recreational area in Askøy Municipality in Vestland county, Norway. The park sits on the western side of the island of Askøy, about 15 kilometres (9.3 mi) northwest of the city of Bergen. The area includes both "clothed" beaches and naturist beaches. Kollevågen also has an arena where the Lost Weekend music festival is held each August.
