= Tveit Church (Vestland) =

Church in Vestland, Norway

- Tveit kirke
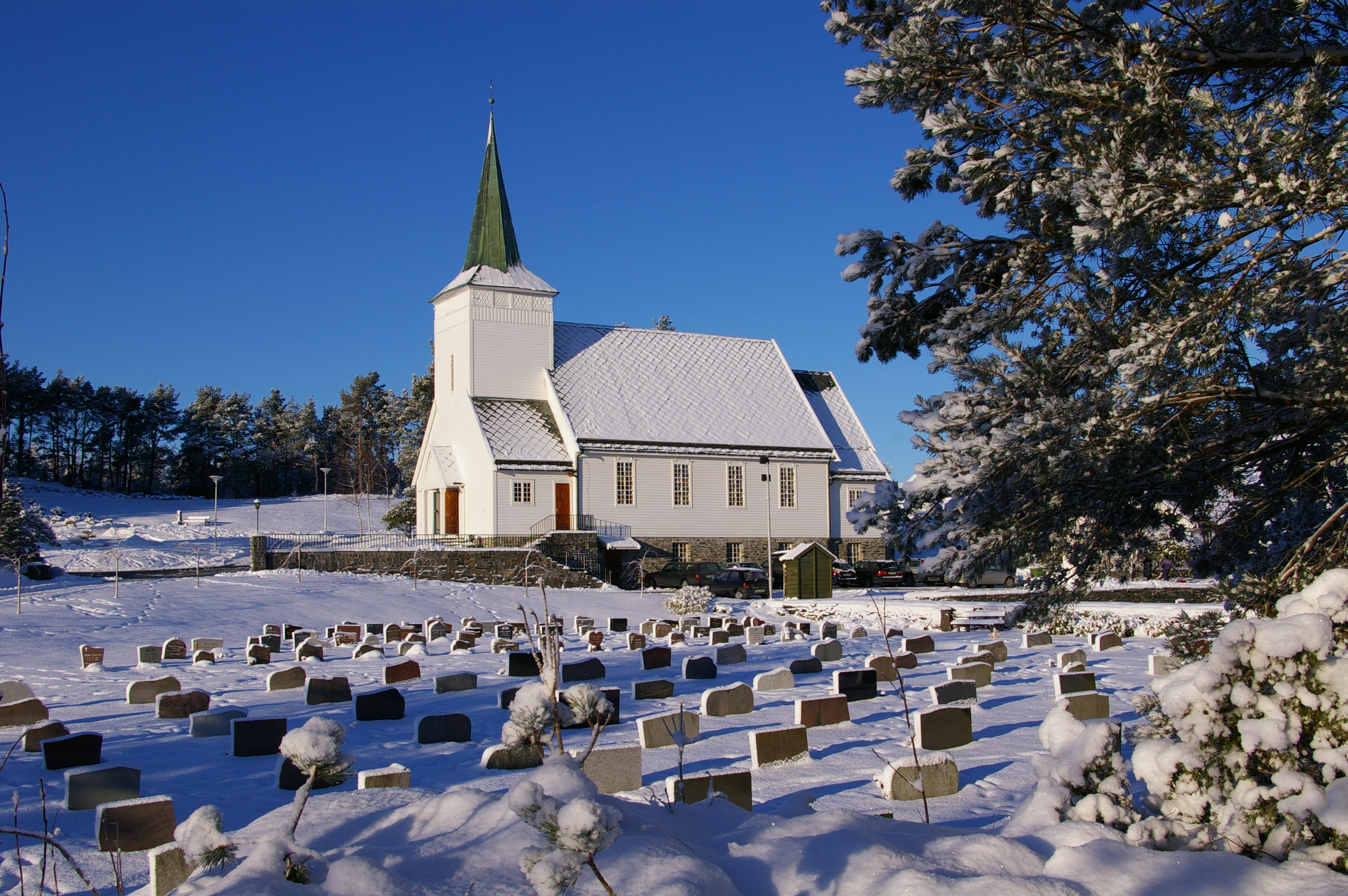
- View of the old church (before 2017)
- Tveit Church
- 60°27′15″N 5°07′54″E
- Location: Askøy Municipality, Vestland
- Country: Norway
- Denomination: Church of Norway
- Churchmanship: Evangelical Lutheran

History
- Former name: Tveit kapell
- Status: Parish church
- Founded: 1957
- Consecrated: 20 Aug 2017

Architecture
- Functional status: Active
- Architect: Tippetue Arkitekter
- Architectural type: Long church
- Completed: 2017 (9 years ago)

Specifications
- Capacity: 500
- Materials: Wood

Administration
- Diocese: Bjørgvin bispedømme
- Deanery: Vesthordland prosti
- Parish: Tveit
- Norwegian Cultural Heritage Site
- Type: Church
- Status: Not protected
- ID: 85691

Tveit Church (Norwegian: Tveit kirke) is a parish church of the Church of Norway in Askøy Municipality in Vestland county, Norway. It is located in the village of Tveitevåg on the western side of the island of Askøy. It is the church for the Tveit parish which is part of the Vesthordland prosti (deanery) in the Diocese of Bjørgvin. The white, wooden church was built in a long church design in 2017 using plans drawn up by the architectural firm Tippetue arkitekter from Bergen. The church seats about 500 people.

== History ==
The first church at Tveitevåg was built in 1957. The white, wooden church was built in a long church style using designs by the architects Torgeir Alvsaker and Einar Vaardal-Lunde. Oskar Edvardsen was the lead builder for the project. The church seated about 300 people. It was consecrated on 5 May 1957. The nave was 15 by 10 metres (49 ft × 33 ft) and the choir was 4.5 by 4.5 metres (15 ft × 15 ft). Over time, the church was too small for the parish, so it was torn down in 2016 and a new, larger church was completed in 2017 and consecrated on 20 August 2017. The new church has a similar design to the old church, but it is 6 metres (20 ft) wider and 10 metres (33 ft) longer.

== See also ==
- List of churches in Bjørgvin
