= Kolbeinsvarden =

Mountain in Vestland, Norway

- Askøyfjellet (unofficial)
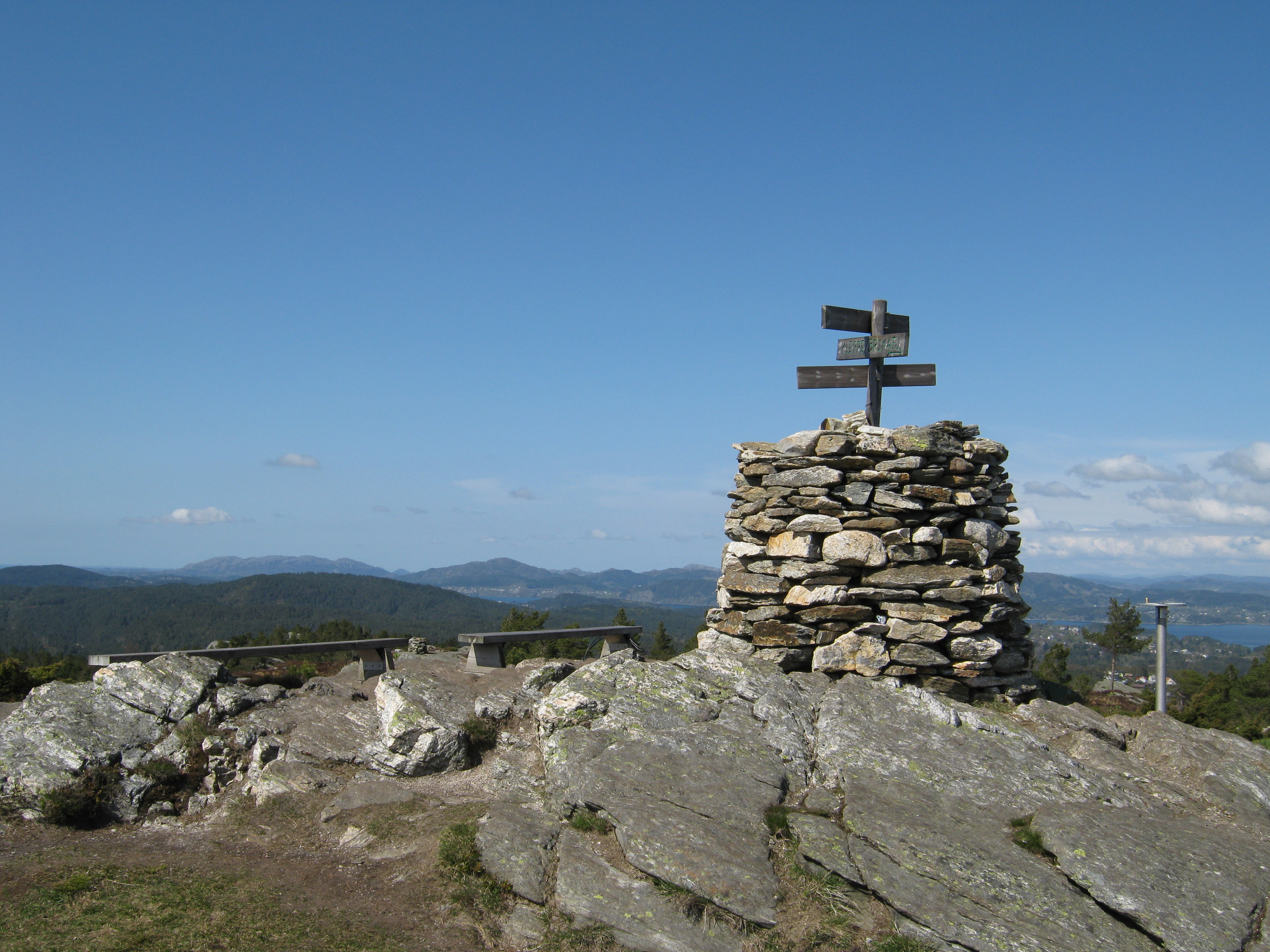
- Top of the Kolbeinsvarden, the highest mountain in Askøy Municipality

Highest point
- Elevation: 231 m (758 ft)
- Prominence: 231 m (758 ft)
- Isolation: 5 km (3.1 mi)
- Coordinates: 60°26′12″N 5°12′34″E

Geography
- Location: Vestland, Norway
- Topo map: 1115 I Bergen

Climbing
- Easiest route: Hiking

Kolbeinsvarden (sometimes called Askøyfjellet) is a mountain in Askøy Municipality in Vestland county, Norway. The 231-metre (758 ft) tall mountain lies near the southeastern coast of the island of Askøy, just north of the village of Kleppestø. The mountain is traditionally considered to be one of De syv fjell (lit. 'the seven mountains') that surround the city of Bergen.

== See also ==
- List of mountains of Norway
