= Jan Mikkelsen =

Norwegian politician (1933–2017)

Jan Mikkelsen (16 February 1933 – 6 April 2017) was a Norwegian politician for the Conservative Party.

He was born in Askøy Municipality as a son of a general manager, and after commerce school he worked as a textile and clothing salesman his entire life.

He chaired Askøy Conservative Party from 1965 to 1968 and was a member of the municipal council of Askøy Municipality from 1967 to 2007. In addition to four of the terms being in the executive committee, he served as deputy mayor in 1976 and 1977 and mayor in 1978 and 1979. He served as a deputy representative to the Parliament of Norway from Hordaland during the term 1981–1985. In total he met during 259 days of parliamentary session.

Mikkelsen was a board member of several local institutions, such as Ask IL from 1960 to 1963 (chairman), an energy company (chair), a men's choir, a retirement home and an indoor sports complex. He was also a supervisory council member of Bergenshalvøens Kommunale Kraftselskap.
