= Knut Hanselmann =

Norwegian politician (1946–2022)

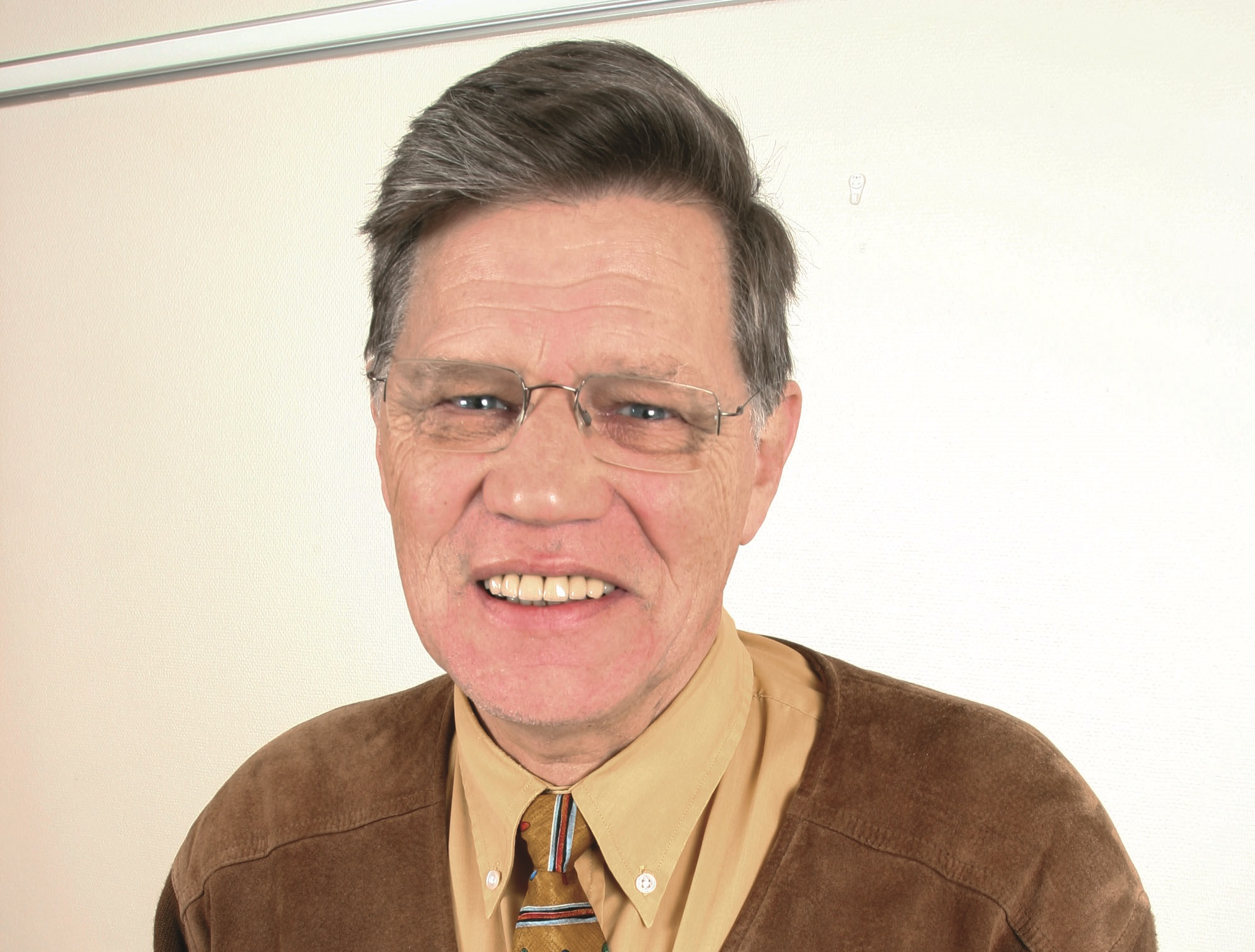

Knut Hanselmann (14 March 1946 – 31 December 2022) was a Norwegian politician for the Progress Party.

Hanselmann was elected to the Norwegian Parliament from Hordaland in 1989, but was not re-elected in 1993. He had previously served in the position of deputy representative during the term 1981–1985. Hanselmann was also involved in local politics in Bergen Municipality and Askøy Municipality. In 2007 he became the mayor of Askøy Municipality. From 1987 to 1989 he was also a member of Hordaland county council. He left the Norwegian Parliamentary Intelligence Oversight Committee in 2011.

Hanselmann died of cancer on 31 December 2022, at the age of 76.
