= Strusshamn =

Village in Askøy Municipality, Norway

- Village
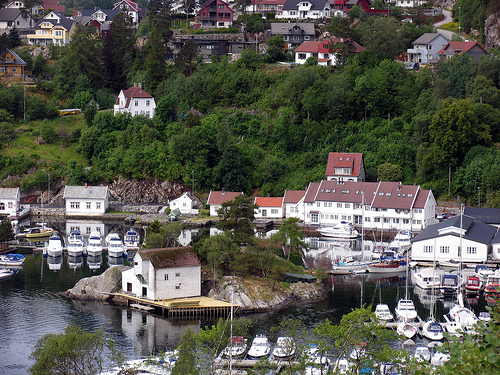
- View of Strusshamn harbour seen from east
- Interactive map of Strusshamn
- Coordinates: 60.40435°N 5.19179°E
- Country: Norway
- Region: Western Norway
- County: Vestland
- District: Midhordland
- Municipality: Askøy Municipality
- Elevation: 21 m (69 ft)
- Time zone: UTC+01:00 (CET)
  - Summer (DST): UTC+02:00 (CEST)
- Post Code: 5302 Strusshamn

Strusshamn is an urban village in Askøy Municipality in Vestland county, Norway. The village lies along the Byfjorden on the southern coast of the island of Askøy, just west of the large urban village of Kleppestø. Strusshamn is one of the cultural centers of the municipality, and it is the site of the main church for the municipality, Strusshamn Church.

The village is part of the urban area known as Askøy which covers most of the southern part of the island of Askøy. Statistics Norway tracks data for Askøy, but it does not separately track the population statistics for this village area. The population of the whole Askøy urban area (in 2025) was 24,660.

== History ==
Strusshamn is well known for its long maritime traditions and history. There are wooden buildings here dating back to around 1800. The village was used in the 18th and 19th centuries as the quarantine harbour for the city of Bergen, located a few kilometres to the east. Today, the production facilities for Viksund Boats is located in the village. Strusshamn is connected to the city of Bergen by the Askøy Bridge.
