= Viksund Boats =

Norwegian motor yacht company

Viksund Yachts of Norway
- Industry: Yacht Building
- Founded: 1966
- Headquarters: Askøy, Norway
- Key people: Rune Viksund (C.E.O.)
- Products: Yachts
- Website: Official Website

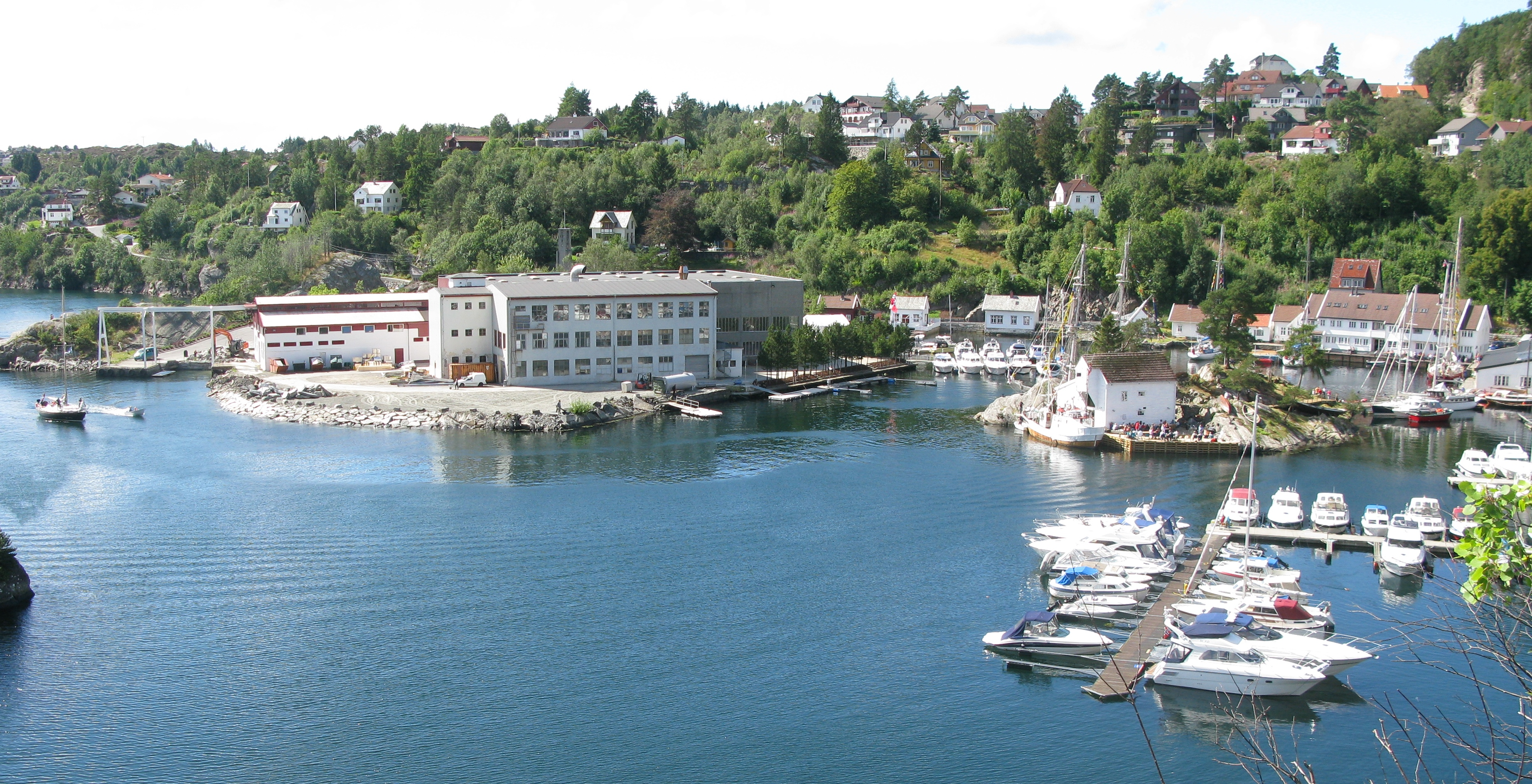
The Viksund factory situated in idyllic surroundings in the harbour of Strusshamn

Viksund Boats AS is a Norwegian motor yacht builder, currently owned by Rune Viksund.

Started in 1966 by Erling Viksund, the company presently builds motor yachts at a facility in Strusshamn, on the island of Askøy just outside Bergen.

== History ==
The company was formed in 1966 and operated from an old farmhouse in Bergen. The first Viksund boat was the 25 Sabbcruiser.

Viksund was among the pioneers for fiberglass boatbuilding in Norway, and attracted significant early sales. By the late 1960s the farmhouse facility was outgrown and Viksund relocated to Strusshaum. By the 1970s Viksun was one of Norway's largest boat-building firms, producing fishing vessels and motor yachts for export and domestic use.

In the late 1980s the company was restructured after a fall in the market. New models were developed, and by the late 1990s Viksund was again among Norway's largest biggest boat building firms. Since 2000 the company has focused exclusively on motor yachts ranging from 30 to 40 feet, including the Viksund 320, Viksund 340 St Cruz, and the Viksund 360 St Cruz.

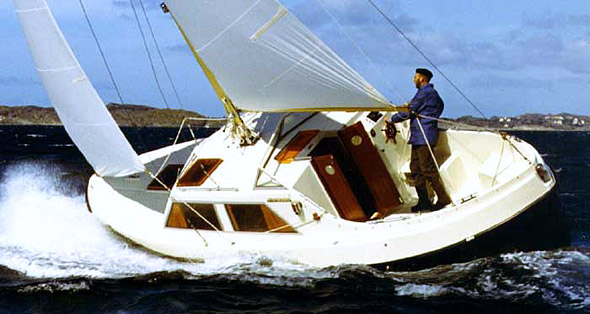
The Viksund 27 columbi was one of many classic models developed by Viksund throughout the 1970s

Viksund employs seventy people and produces approximately 80 yachts a year. It is run by Erling Viksund's son, Rune Viksund.

Turnover in 2007 was $US 18.5 million. The export rate of the company is around 35% and the main export countries are Denmark, Sweden, Iceland, the Netherlands, Germany, Switzerland and Russia.

In 2008 Viksund Asia opened a new production and distribution point in Negombo, Sri Lanka. The boats are distributed to Maldives and other Asian countries.

== Models ==
- Viksund 320 - 32 feet
- Viksund 340 St Cruz - 34 feet
- Viksund 360 St Cruz - 36 feet
- Viksund 390 St Cruz - 39 feet (Premeiere winter 2010)
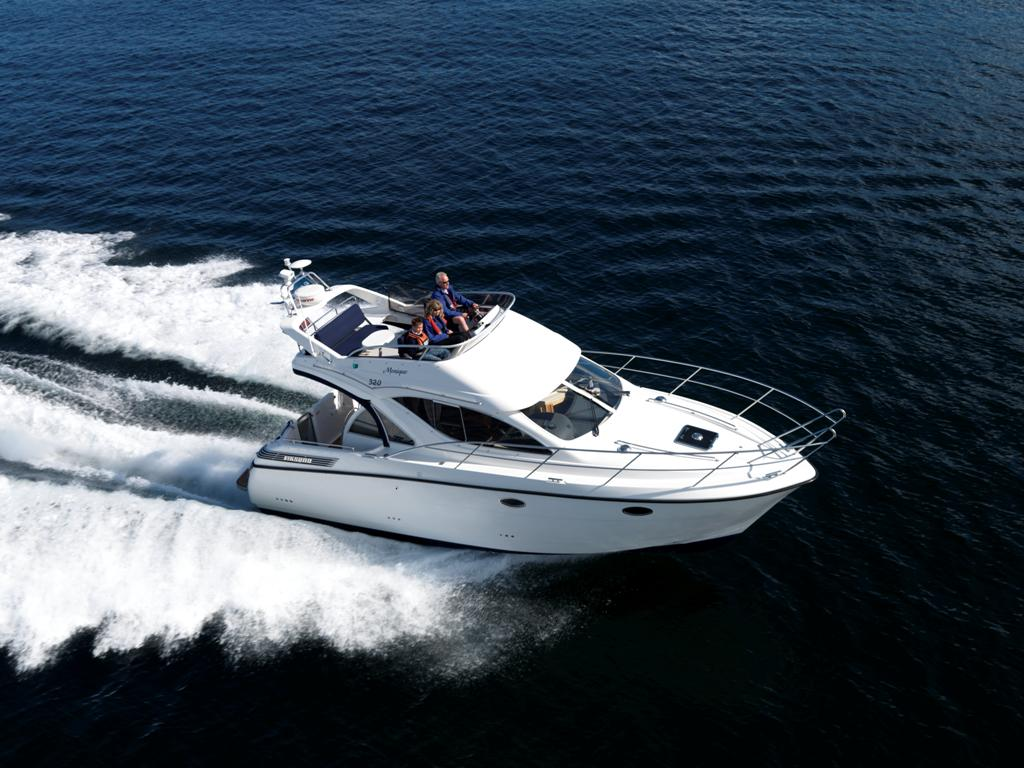
The Viksund 320

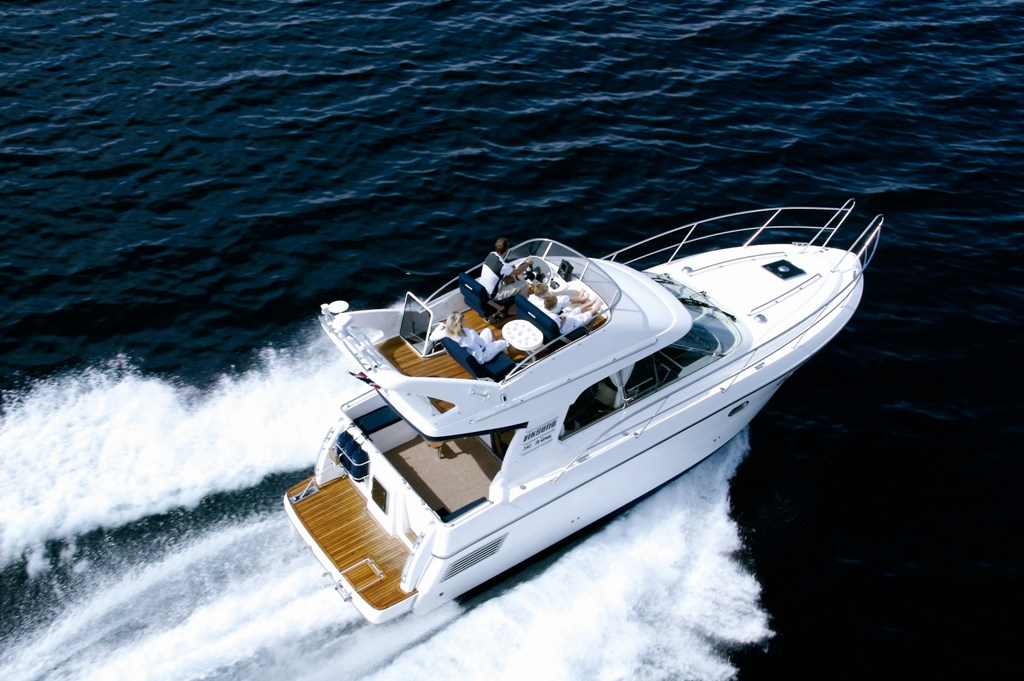
The Viksund 340 Flybridge version

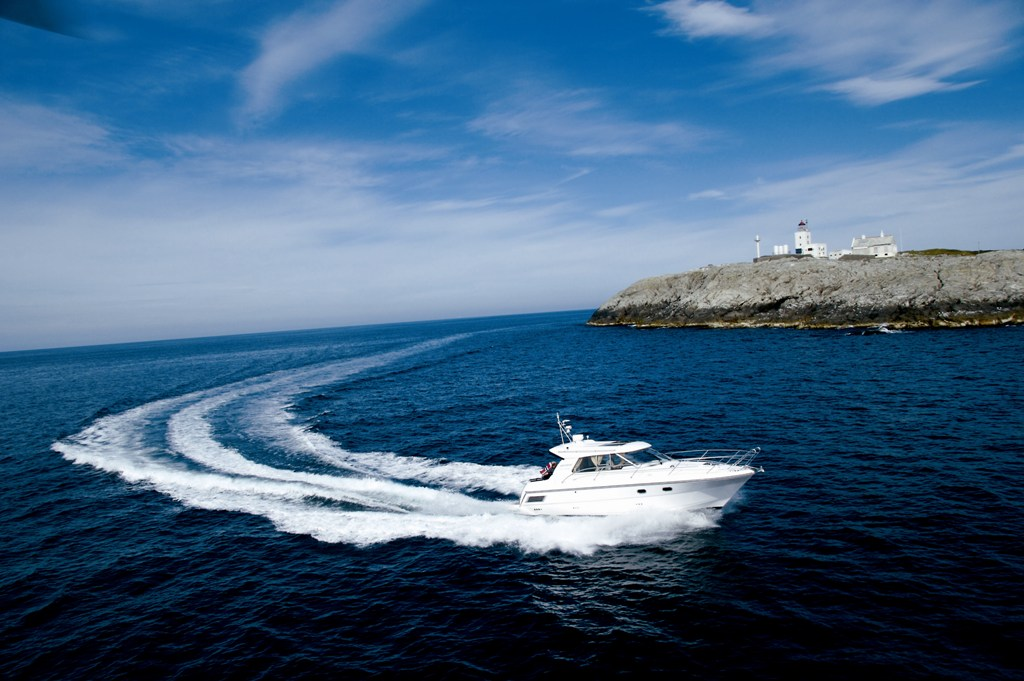
The Viksund 340 Hardtop version

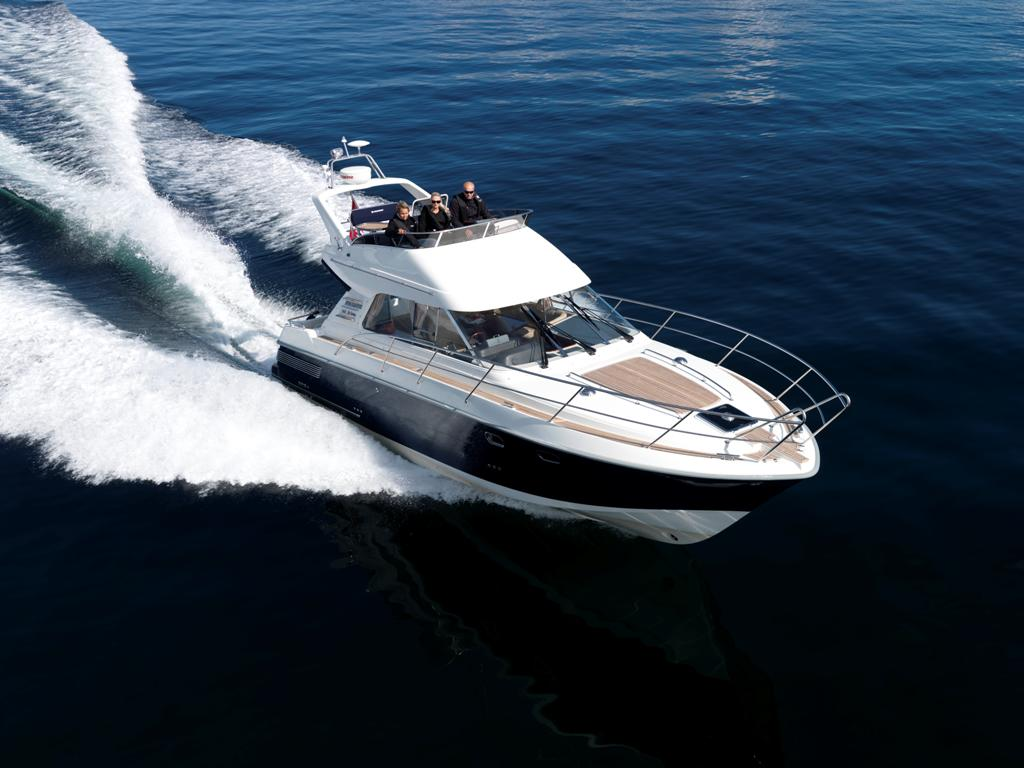
The Viksund 360 Flybridge version

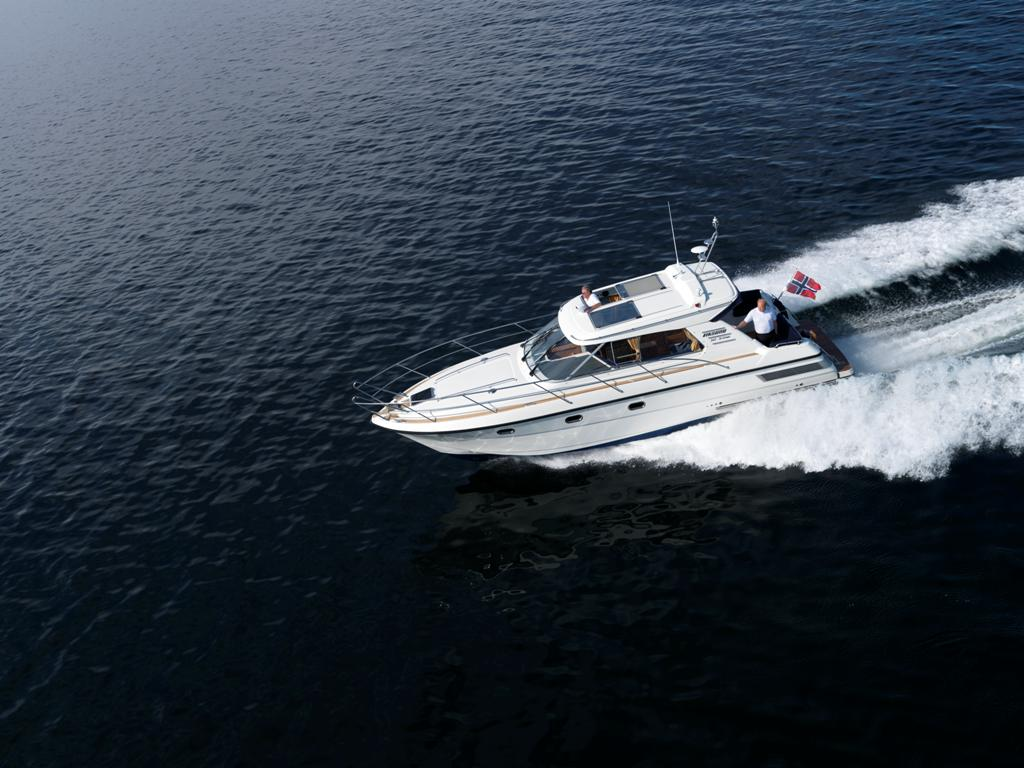
The Viksund 360 Hardtop version

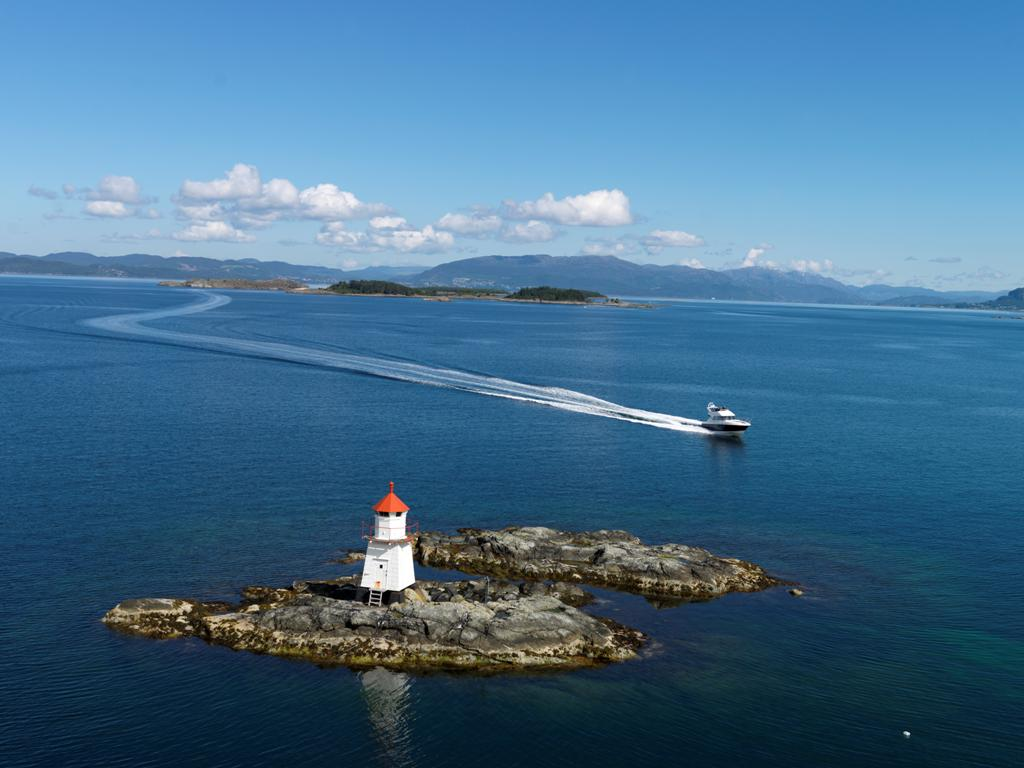
The Viksund 360 St Cruz
