= Byfjorden (Vestland) =

Fjord in Vestland, Norway

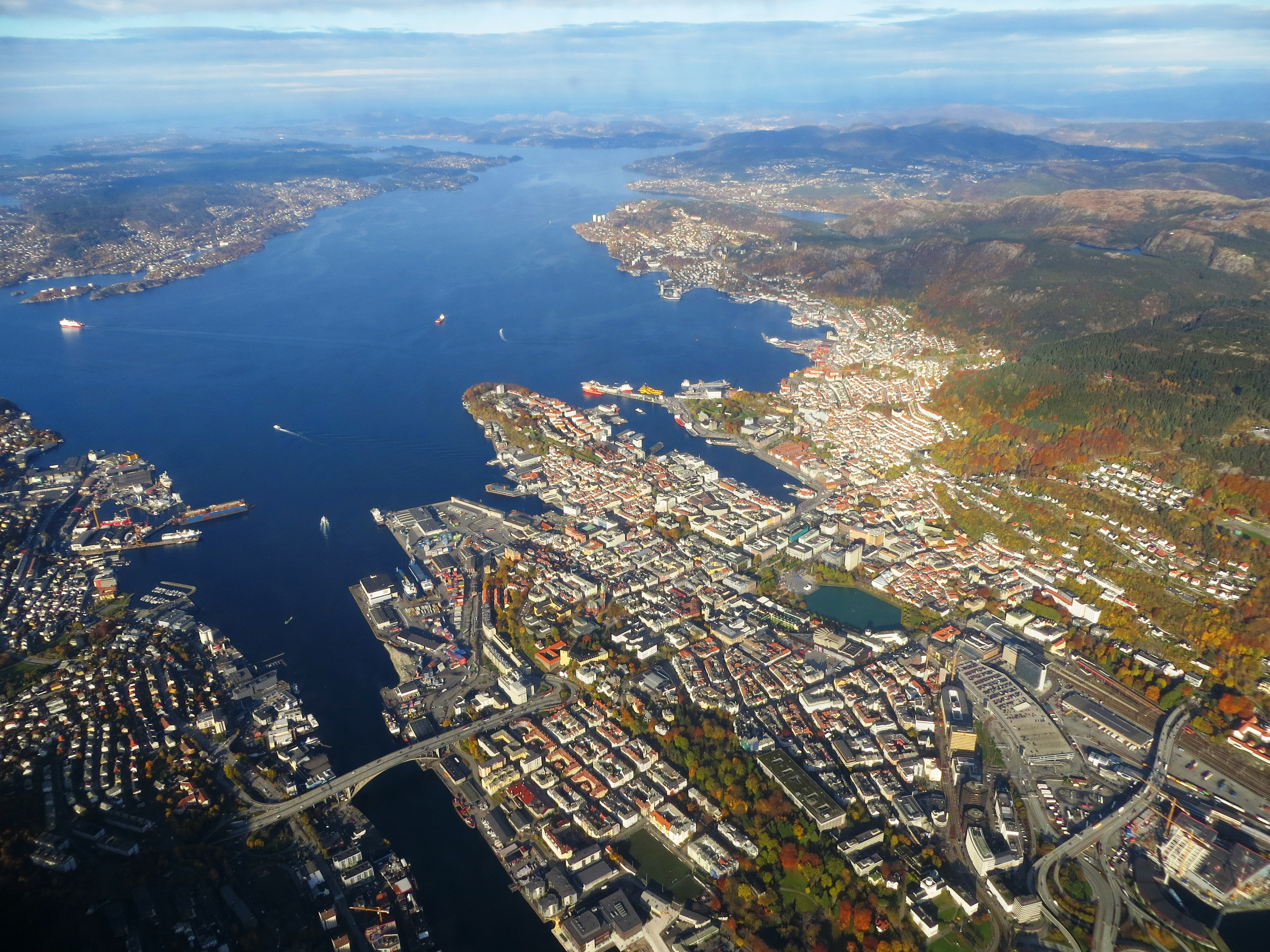
- View of the fjord (looking north)
- Interactive map of Byfjorden
- Location: Vestland county, Norway
- Coordinates: 60.40345°N 5.26704°E
- Type: Fjord
- Primary inflows: Salhusfjorden, Herdlefjorden
- Basin countries: Norway
- Max. length: 15 kilometres (9.3 mi)
- Settlements: Bergen

Byfjorden (Norwegian: [byːfjɔrn], also [byːfjɔɾn], Bokmål: [byːfjɔɳ], Bergensk: [byːfjɔʁn]) is a fjord in Vestland county, Norway. The 15-kilometre (9.3 mi) long fjord separates the island of Askøy from the mainland Bergen Peninsula, passing right north of the city of Bergen on the mainland.

There is one road crossing over the Byfjorden: the Askøy Bridge, which crosses near the western end of the fjord. The name literally means city-fjord, and it is so named because of its importance as a transportation route into and out of the city of Bergen.

== Location ==
The western entrance to the Byfjorden is between the village of Drotningsvik (Laksevåg borough in Bergen Municipality) and the village of Marikoven (on the island of Askøy in Askøy Municipality). The northern entrance to the fjord is between the village of Ask on Askøy and Mjølkeråen in the borough of Åsane in Bergen. On the northern end, it connects with the Salhusfjorden and Herdlefjorden.

=== Arms and bays ===
Bergen Municipality	Askøy Municipality
Åstveitvågen; Eidsvågen; Breiviken; Sandviken; Vågen; Puddefjorden; Damsgårdssundet; Store Lungegårdsvann; Gravdalsbukten; Kjøkkelvika; Olsvika; Godvik; Breivika	Strusshamn; Klampavika; Kyllaren; Florvågen; Bakarvågen; Erdalsvågen; Olavika; Hopshamna; Askehamna
