= Askevatnet =

Lake in Norway

- Interactive map of Askevatnet
- Location: Askøy Municipality, Vestland
- Coordinates: 60.49031°N 5.1704°E
- Basin countries: Norway
- Max. length: 2.9 kilometres (1.8 mi)
- Max. width: 1.3 kilometres (0.81 mi)
- Surface area: 2.15 km^{2} (0.83 sq mi)
- Shore length^{1}: 10.53 kilometres (6.54 mi)
- Surface elevation: 12 metres (39 ft)
- References: NVE
- ^{1} Shore length is not a well-defined measure.

Askevatnet is a lake in Askøy Municipality in Vestland county, Norway. The 2.15-square-kilometre (0.83 sq mi) lake lies just northeast of the village of Ask on the eastern side of the island of Askøy. The lake is regulated by a small dam on the southeastern part of the lake.

== See also ==
- List of lakes in Norway
