= Kleppestø =

Village in Askøy Municipality, Norway

- Village
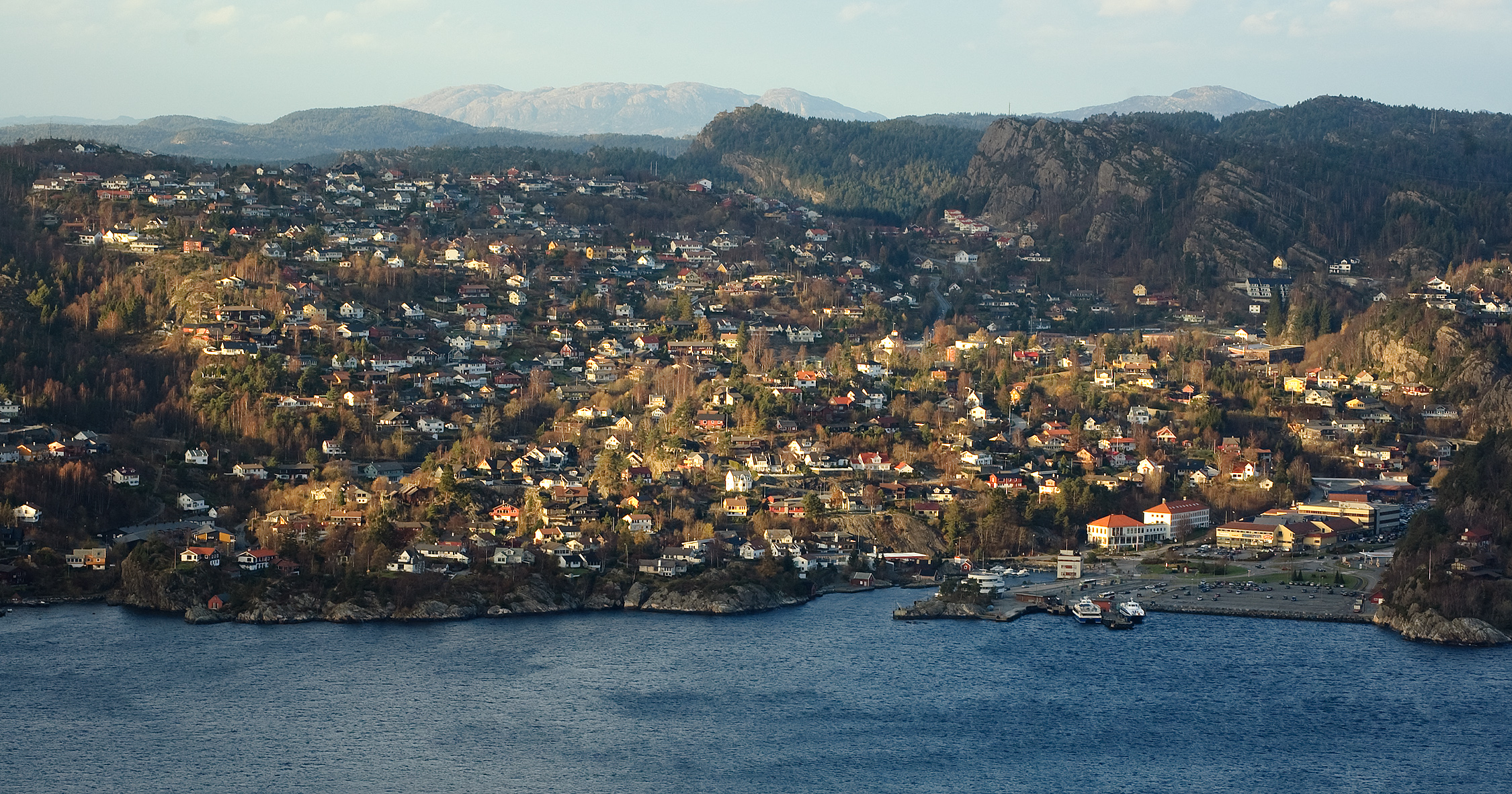
- View of the village as seen from Bergen
- Interactive map of Kleppestø
- Coordinates: 60.40842°N 5.22436°E
- Country: Norway
- Region: Western Norway
- County: Vestland
- District: Midhordland
- Municipality: Askøy Municipality
- Elevation: 19 m (62 ft)
- Time zone: UTC+01:00 (CET)
  - Summer (DST): UTC+02:00 (CEST)
- Post Code: 5300 Kleppestø

Kleppestø is the administrative centre of Askøy Municipality in Vestland county, Norway. The village is located on the southern coast of the island of Askøy. The village of Florvåg lies just north of Kleppestø and the village of Strusshamn lies to the west. Kleppestø is connected to the city of Bergen by the Askøy Bridge.

The village is part of the urban area known as Askøy which covers most of the southern part of the island of Askøy. Statistics Norway tracks data for Askøy, but it does not separately track the population statistics for this village area. The population of the whole Askøy urban area (in 2025) was 24,660.
