= Herdlefjorden =

Fjord in Vestland, Norway

- Herdlafjorden (unofficial)
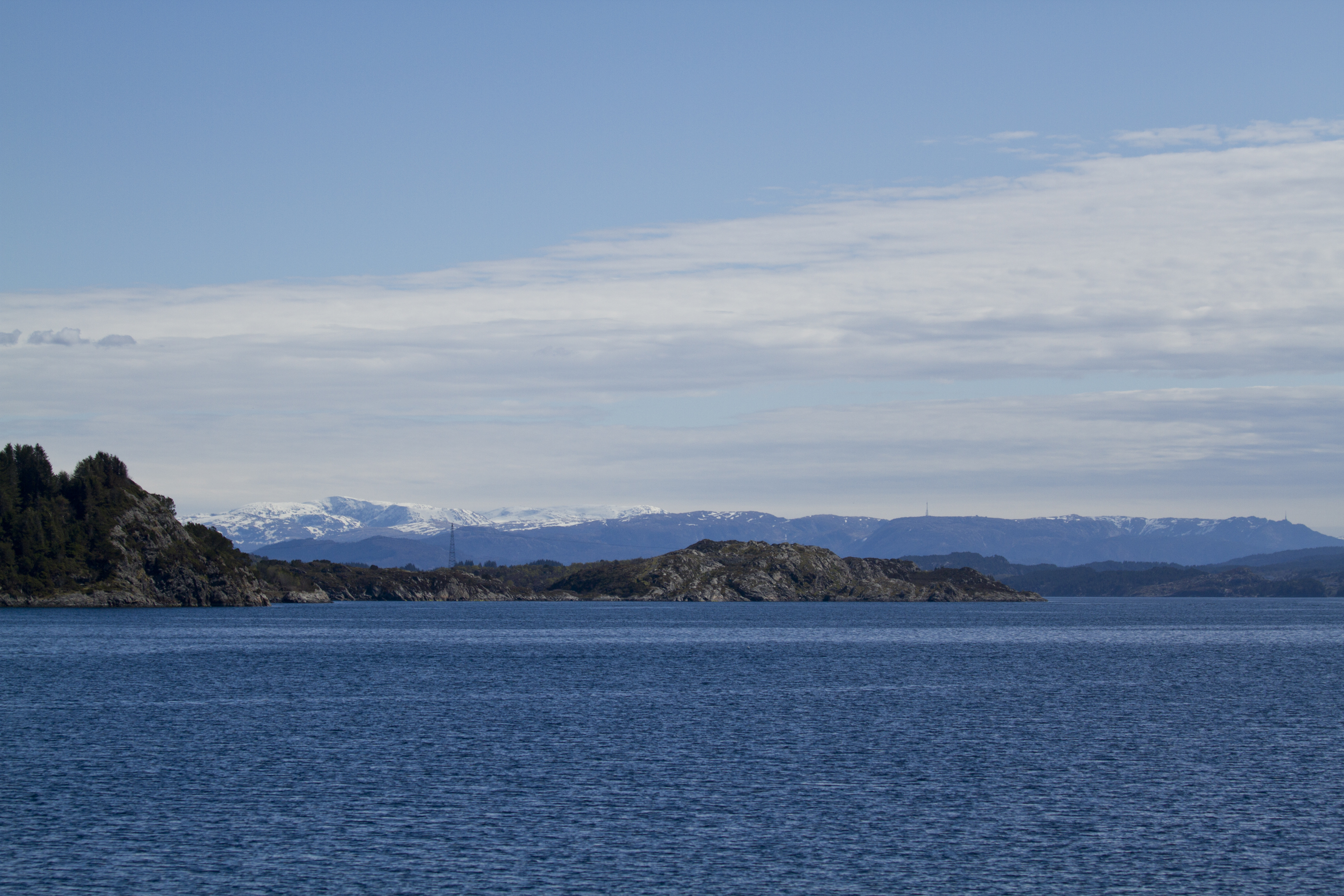
- View of the fjord
- Interactive map of Herdlefjorden
- Location: Vestland county, Norway
- Coordinates: 60.52832°N 5.10106°E
- Type: Fjord
- Basin countries: Norway
- Max. length: 20 kilometres (12 mi)
- Max. width: 2.7 kilometres (1.7 mi)
- Settlements: Holme

Herdlefjorden is a fjord in Vestland county, Norway. The 20-kilometre (12 mi) long fjord runs between the islands of Holsnøy (in Alver Municipality) and Askøy (in Askøy Municipality). The fjord connects with the Salhusfjorden and the Byfjorden on the southeast end and it flows out into the Hjeltefjorden on the northwest end of the fjord. The fjord is named after the island of Herdla, located at the northern end of the fjord.

The fjord leads directly from the sea to the port of the city of Bergen, however at the northern end of the Herdlefjorden there are several small islands which cause a narrow bottleneck which congests sea traffic.

== See also ==
- List of Norwegian fjords
