= Askøy (island) =

Island in Vestland, Norway

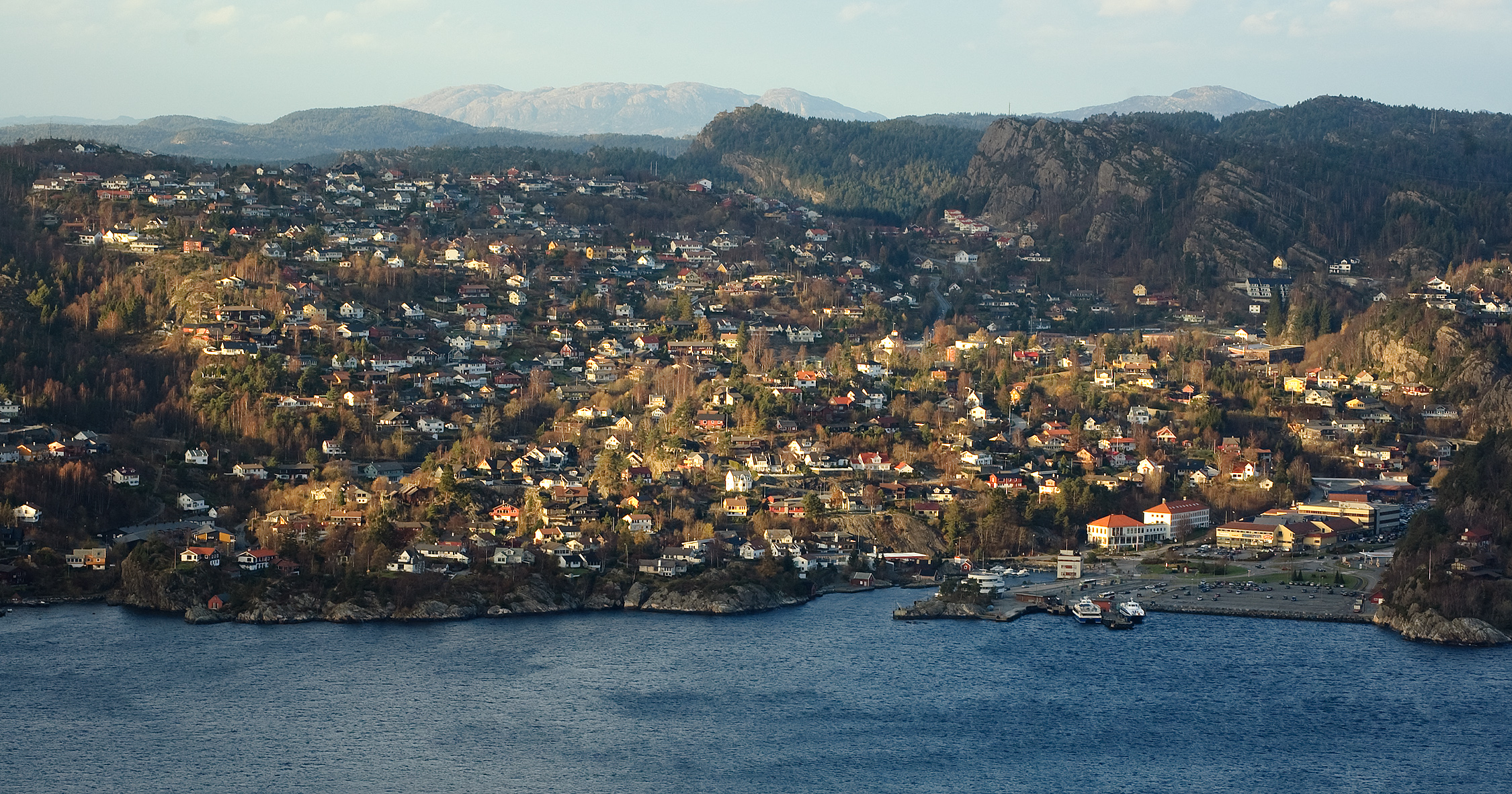
- View of the village of Kleppestø
- Interactive map of Askøy

Geography
- Location: Vestland, Norway
- Coordinates: 60.475°N 5.10833°E
- Area: 91.4 km^{2} (35.3 sq mi)
- Length: 22 km (13.7 mi)
- Width: 8 km (5 mi)
- Highest elevation: 231 m (758 ft)
- Highest point: Askøyfjellet

Administration
- Norway
- County: Vestland
- Municipality: Askøy Municipality

Demographics
- Population: 29430 (2022)
- Pop. density: 322/km^{2} (834/sq mi)

Askøy is an island in Askøy Municipality in Vestland county, Norway. The 90-square-kilometre (35 sq mi) island makes up about 91% of the municipal area and is home to about 99% of the municipal residents. In 2022, there were 29,430 people living on the island. Since the opening of the Askøy Bridge leading to the mainland in the city of Bergen in 1992, the population has increased rapidly. The island is named after the old Ask farm along the eastern coast of the island. The village is the site of the old Ask Church.

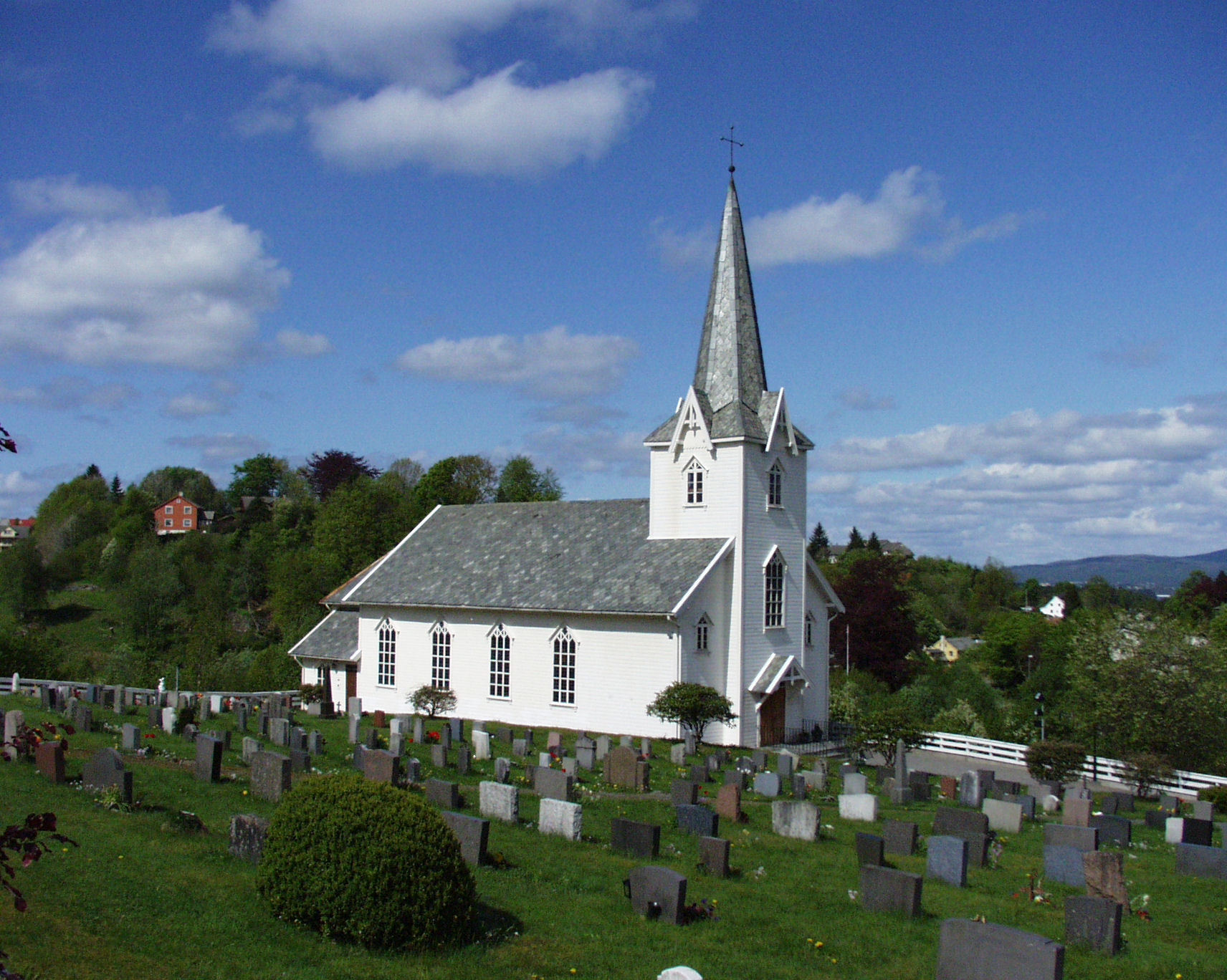
A view of Ask Church

== Geography ==
Askøy is surrounded by fjords: the Hjeltefjorden lies to the west and north, the Byfjorden to the east, and the Herdlefjorden to the northeast. The Bergen Peninsula (mainland) lies to the south and east of the island, the island of Holsnøy lies to the northeast, the small island of Herdla lies immediately to the north, the islands of Øygarden Municipality (Ona, Blomøyna, Rongøyna, Toftøyna) lie to the west, and the islands of Sotra and Litlesotra lie to the southwest. The areas around the bridge (where the villages of Kleppestø and Strusshamn are located) and along the east coast (around the village of Florvåg and Erdal) are densely populated due to their proximity to the city of Bergen across the fjord. Historically there were regular ferry connections, and now there is the Askøy Bridge. The northern and western parts of the island are very sparsely populated. The large lake Askevatnet lies along the eastern shore of the island.

== See also ==
- Thomas Erichsens Minde
- List of islands of Norway
