= Sotra Bridge =

Bridge in Vestland, Norway

Old Sotra Bridge Gamle Sotra Brua
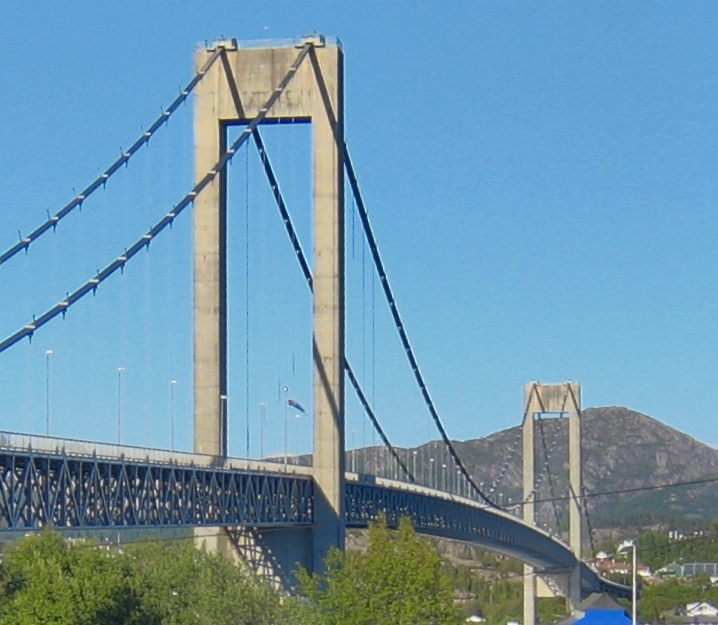
- Coordinates: 60°22′21″N 5°09′57″E
- Carries: Two lanes of National Road 555
- Crosses: Knarreviksundet
- Locale: Bergen and Øygarden, Norway
- Official name: Gamle Sotrabrua
- Maintained by: Norwegian Public Roads Administration

Characteristics
- Design: Suspension bridge
- Total length: 1,236 metres (4,055 ft)
- Longest span: 468 metres (1,535 ft)
- Clearance below: 50 metres (160 ft)

History
- Opened: 11 December 1971

Location
- Interactive map of Old Sotra Bridge

The Old Sotra Bridge (Norwegian: Gamle Sotrabrua) is a suspension bridge which crosses Knarreviksundet between Knarrevik in Øygarden Municipality and Drotningsvik on the mainland of Bergen Municipality in Vestland county, Norway. It carries two road lanes and two narrow pedestrian paths of National Road 555, providing a fixed link for the archipelago of Sotra. The bridge is 1,236 metres (4,055 ft) long, has a main span of 468 metres (1,535 ft) and a clearance of 50 metres (160 ft). In 2007, on average 25,494 vehicles used it per day.

The bridge became operational on 11 December 1971, although not officially opened until 1972. It cost 40 million Norwegian krone (NOK) to build, of which NOK 23.5 million was paid for with tolls, which were collected until 1983. When it opened, it was the longest suspension bridge in Norway, but is now the seventh longest. There exist plans to build a second bridge to either expand the road to four lanes, or carry a proposed extension of the Bergen Light Rail. Alternatively, a subsea tunnel could be built to carry a motorway.

A second Sotra Bridge is being built as part of the National Road 555 Sotra Connection project (Norwegian: Rv. 555 Sotrasambandet), with construction underway since 2023 and completion expected in 2027.

== Specifications ==
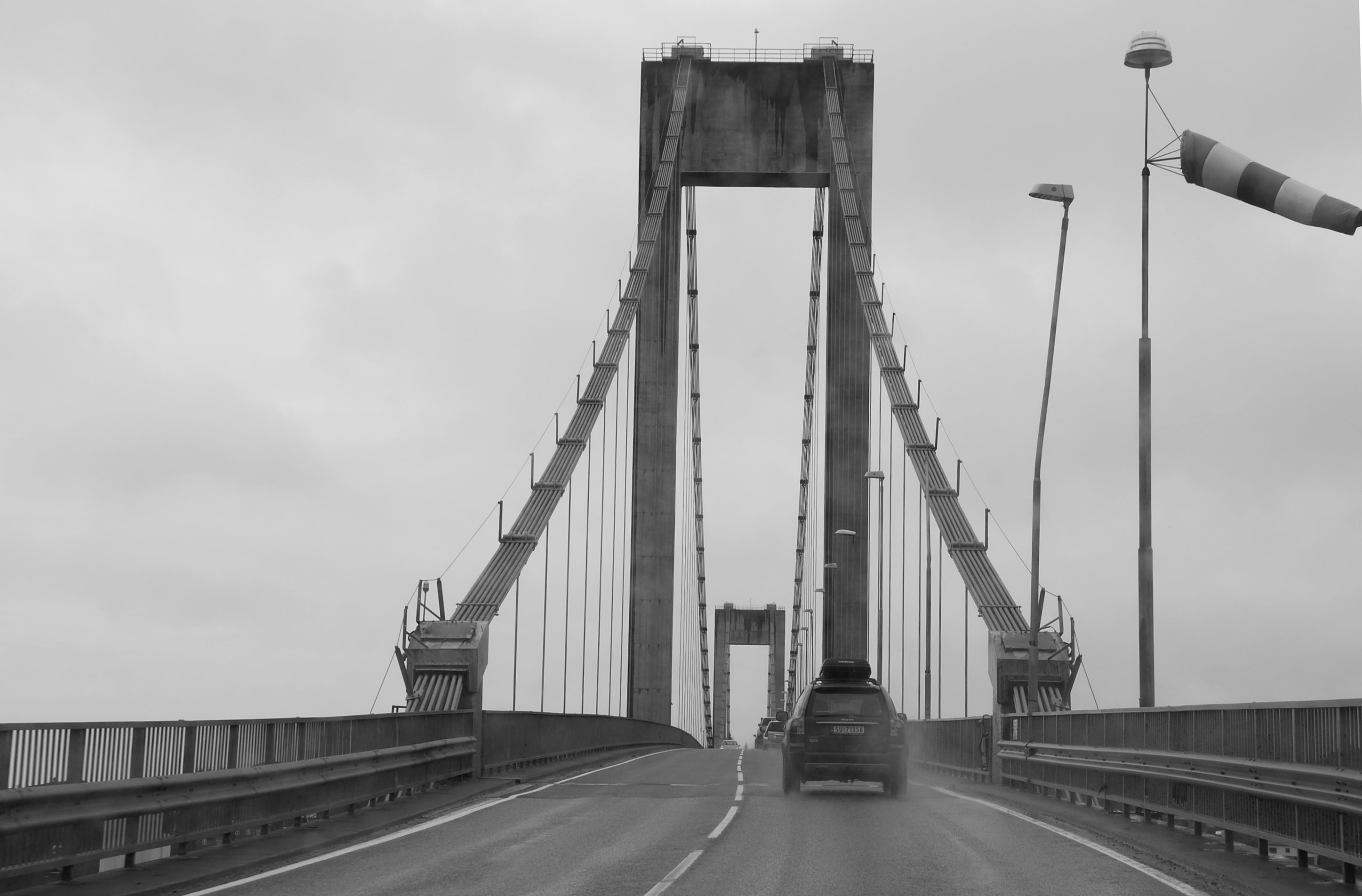
The bridge deck

The concrete bridge crosses Knarreviksundet, which separates the island of Litlesotra, part of the Sotra archipelago, from the mainland and Bergen. The western part of the bridge, on Sotra, lies in Knarrevik in Øygarden Municipality, while the eastern part lies in Drotningsvik in Bergen Municipality. The bridge is 1,236 metres (4,055 ft) long with a main span of 468 metres (1,535 ft). It carries two lanes of National Road 555, with a combined width of 7.5 metres (25 ft). In addition, it has a 0.8-meter (2 ft 7 in) wide sidewalk on each side. In 2009, it had an annual average daily traffic of 25,494 vehicles. Because it is located across the sound, the bridge is vulnerable to winds from the north and south. It is closed whenever the wind speed exceeds 30 metres per second (98 ft/s).

== History ==
=== Planning ===
The first discussion of a bridge in a public forum was in 1954, when Anton P. Torsvik proposed a bridge to the major and municipal engineer of Fjell Municipality (Fjell has been part of Øygarden Municipality since 2020). Torsvik lived in Oslo and had worked with public relations for various other bridge projects. The issue was discussed in the municipal councils of Fjell Municipality and Sund Municipality, but they both concluded that there were more pressing needs on the islands' road network, so they did not want to prioritize a bridge. National Road 555 was completed in 1957, and the following years various road projects were completed.

Another person who took up the initiative in the late 1950s was Rangvald Iversen, who was plant manager at Norwegian Talc at Knarrevik. The plant had large costs freighting their products across the sound on the Alvøy–Brattholmen Ferry. In 1958, he took the initiative to conduct a traffic count, which along with estimates of increased traffic from other places that had replaced a ferry with a bridge, would give estimates for the revenue from tolls. Norwegian Talc also paid for a draft plan for a bridge. In 1959, Iversen presented an estimate that a bridge would cost NOK 15.5 million, and on 19 December 1959, the council voted unanimously to recommend that a committee be established to continue work on the bridge plans. In 1960, the bridge was included in the road plan for Hordaland.

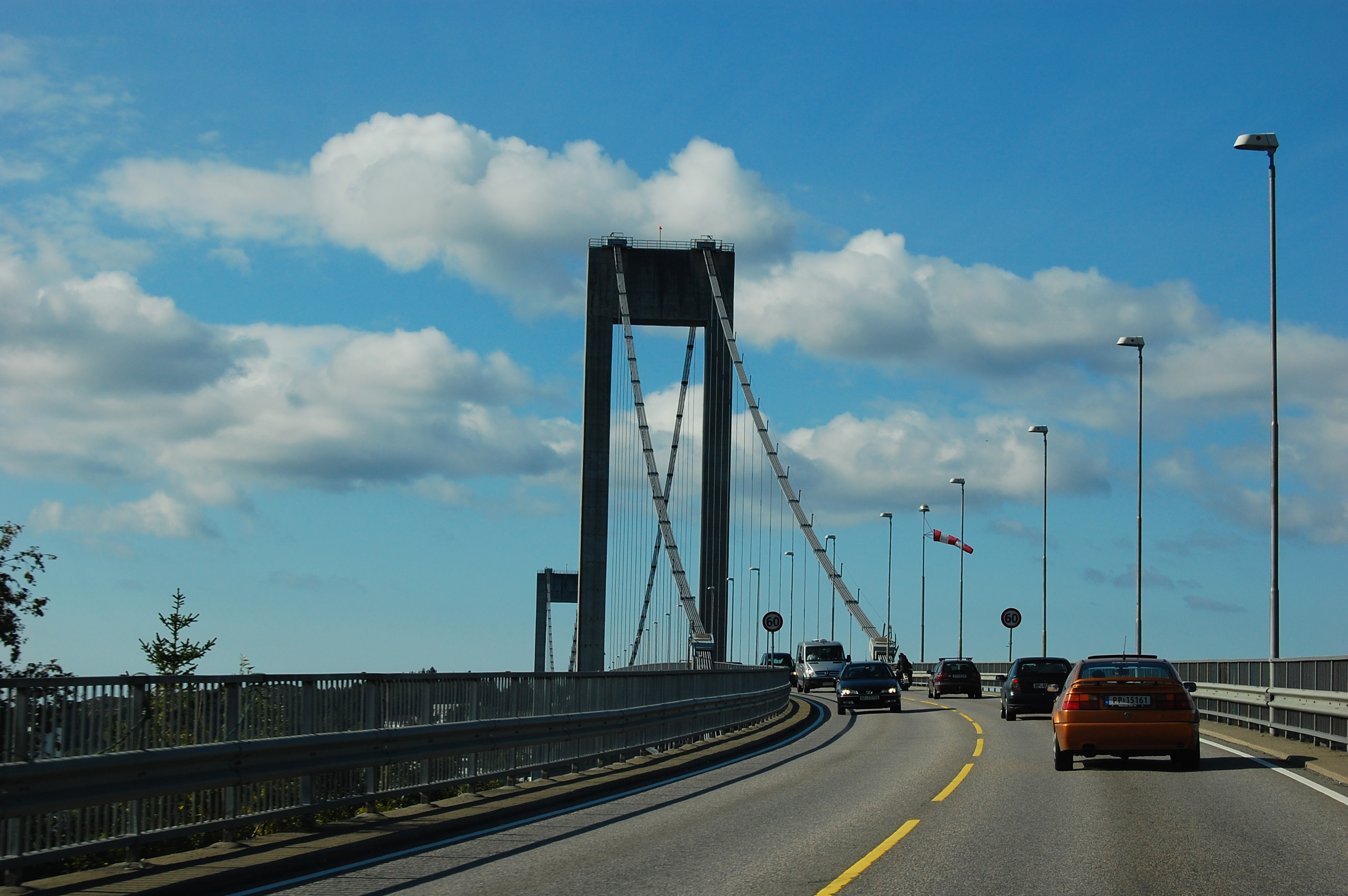
The bridge from the mainland

There were also some plans for the future which would remove the last ferries within the Sotra and Øygarden archipelagos, meaning that the entire twin archipelago would have ferry-free access to the mainland, should the Sotra Bridge be built. The plans had been spurred by a large decrease in fishing during the late 1950s, and the need for increased tax revenue from new industries. The framework for the plan started in 1961 with the creation of an inter-municipal cooperation, which in 1964 resulted in the merger of Hjelme Municipality and Herdla Municipality to create Øygarden Municipality. On 8 May 1962, an inter-municipal road committee was established, which recommended that a limited company be established to finance the bridge. In Bergen, Bro og Tunnelselskapet had similarly built the Puddefjord Bridge and Eidsvåg Tunnel, and the inter-municipal council recommended a similar model. However, they wanted a separate company for Sotra and Øygarden, so extra tolls could be used to help finance road projects on the archipelago.

On 29 June 1962, Fjell Municipality sent an official application to the County Governor to start planning, and this was sent onwards to the Directorate for Public Roads. They concluded that it would be possible to finance the bridge with tolls collected over 13 to 14 years, with the state paying for one-third of the bridge. The plans called for the bridge to run south of Norwegian Talc, but it was later routed slightly north, so that the span could be reduced from 520 to 500 meters (1,710 to 1,640 ft). The optimal location would be within the Norwegian Talc plant, and by placing the western pylon on a skerry, it was possible to reduce the span to 468 metres (1,535 ft).

The plans from 1959 called for a height of 60 meters (200 ft), but the Public Roads Administration stated that a height of 50 metres (160 ft) would be sufficient, and also help to reduce the construction costs. In 1962, the extra costs for the higher height were estimated at NOK 4 million. Bergen Port Authority stated in 1963 that they required a height of 66 metres (217 ft), while the local newspapers felt that 50 metres (160 ft) was sufficient. Bergen City Council voted in favor of the shortest proposal. The Royal Norwegian Navy supported a taller bridge, but were more willing to reduce the height than the port authority. The port authority reduced its preferred height to 62 metres (203 ft), with the road authority responding that such a clearance only existed in a very few places in the world, and that the extra costs could result in the whole project being abandoned.

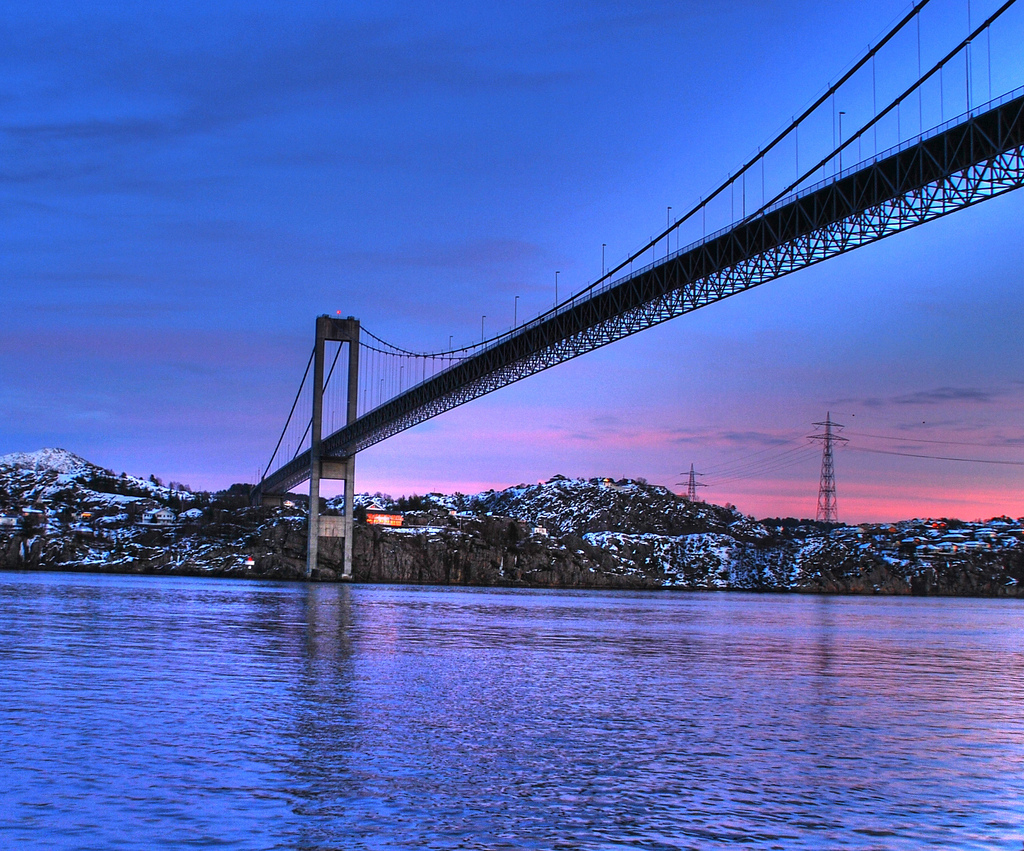
The bridge looking towards the mainland

It was the Ministry of Fisheries and Coastal Affairs who had the final word in the matter. A national committee was established in 1963 to make guidelines for clearances, and it recommended that 60 meters (200 ft) be used in fjords and sounds where very large ships, in particular cruise ships, would pass, while 50 meters (160 ft) would permissible for minor and inner parts of fjords, as well as passages where alternatives were available. The clearance of the Sotra Bridge would only be applicable for ships coming from the south, and even these had the option of sailing around Øygarden, an increased distance of 83 kilometres (52 mi). For ships from the east, the distance would be the same, while from the north they would not pass through the sound. The port authority stated on 11 November 1963 that they were willing to allow a smaller clearance, which was back up by Bergen City Council on 27 November. The ministry finalized the decision on 16 December, supporting a height of 50 metres (160 ft).

=== Financing and construction ===
On 2 January 1965, the bridge committee recommended that a limited company be established to finance the bridge. The three archipelago municipalities, Fjell, Sund, and Øygarden, would purchase shares for NOK 500,000, while another NOK 200,000 would be purchased from the mainland municipalities and Hordaland County Municipality. The company was established as A/S Sotrabrua on 16 October 1965, with the head office located in Fjell. The company was given authority by its owners to apply for a 20-year concession to collect tolls on a new bridge; if the tolls gave a profit beyond covering the debt of the bridge, it was to be used for further construction of roads on Sotra and Øygarden. The company was formally registered on 12 January 1966.

To get satisfactory conditions for the loan, the company was recommended by banks to increase the ownership equity to 10% of the loan. The share capital was insufficient, so the company started issuing preferred shares to individuals and the companies, and managed to secure NOK 1.7 million. An exception to the rules was made, and the company was allowed to start detailed planning before the loans had been finalized. An estimate from 1966 showed that the bridge itself would cost NOK 27 million, while the auxiliary roads would cost NOK 4 million, excluding inflation and interest during construction. On 23 November 1966, the county council supported a proposal that one third of the construction costs be covered by national road funds. On 10 August 1967, the Ministry of Finance and the Bank of Norway gave permission that the company could borrow up to NOK 25 million. The loan was a bond sold by Bergens Privatbank and Samvirke Forsikring, consisting of one series valued at NOK 15 million issued in 1968, and one valued at NOK 10 million issued in 1970, with an interest of 5.5% and 6.0%, respectively. There was a five years interest-only period, followed by ten years of repayment. The mortgage deed was secured in the right to collect tolls, supported by guarantees from the municipalities of Bergen, Fjell, Sund and Øygarden, and the county municipality. In addition, the company was granted loans from Bergens Privatbank, Bergens Sparebank and Vestlandsbanken for NOK 3 million, although these were never used. The state's part of the financing was through a loan from the Regional Development Fund.

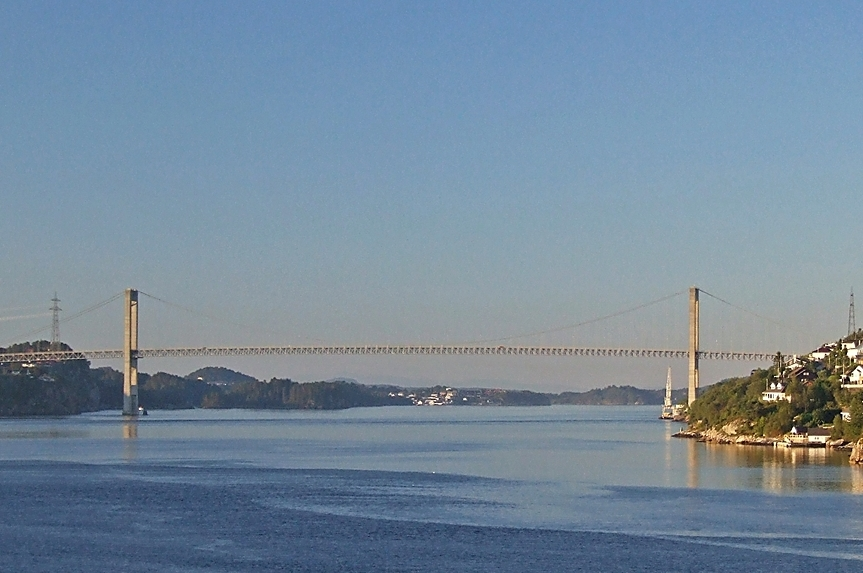
The bridge seen from the north, with Bergen to the left and Sotra to the right

The bridge was approved by the Parliament of Norway on 5 June 1968. An agreement regarding financing was made between A/S Sotrabrua and the Ministry of Transport and Communications on 1 July 1968. The construction of the road would be done by Hordaland Public Road Administration, who would receive two-thirds of the financing of costs up to NOK 34 million from the company. The company would also advance the state's part of the costs, which would be repaid to the company as NOK 1 million per year, for an estimated advance of NOK 8.3 million. The company would be responsible for any interest, including that which would be accumulated during construction, and would have the right to collect tolls on all traffic on the bridge.

The optimal crossing point ran over Norwegian Talc's plant, and would involve placing the western pylon in the middle of their area. The company offered the authorities free land on the condition that they received a satisfactory intersection with the bridge. A formal agreement was reached in mid-1970. On the eastern side, an area development plan had to be made, which was approved on 19 May 1967. The necessary land not already owned by the municipalities was expropriated.

Initial plans had called for the bridge to be completed by October 1972. On 28 December 1968, the company asked the road administration if construction could be quickened. They estimated that the bridge could be completed by December 1971 for a price increase of NOK 750,000. This gave the company NOK 2 million more in profits, as it could more quickly start collecting toll revenue. The company chose to accept this extra cost. The start of construction was delayed, first by the parliamentary decision coming right before the holidays, followed immediately by a national strike by engineers. The contract for the foundation and concrete work was won by Selmer, who started work in March 1969. The steel-work contracts were issued to Høsveis, Bofa and Alfred Andersen; despite them not having the lowest bid, the road administration chose to use the largest companies.

On 11 December 1971, the bridge opened for traffic, and on the same day, the Alvøy–Brattholmen Ferry was terminated. In February 1972, there were twice as many cars as there had been on the ferry in February 1971. The official opening by King Olav V took place on 25 May 1972. The bridge cost NOK 39.8 million to construct. This included NOK 650,000 for the county road between Knarrevik and Brattholmen, which had been paid for by the state. The cost the company had to pay was NOK 23.45 million. The final estimates for the project were for NOK 34 million, and the whole cost above this was covered by the state. When it opened, the bridge was the longest in Norway.

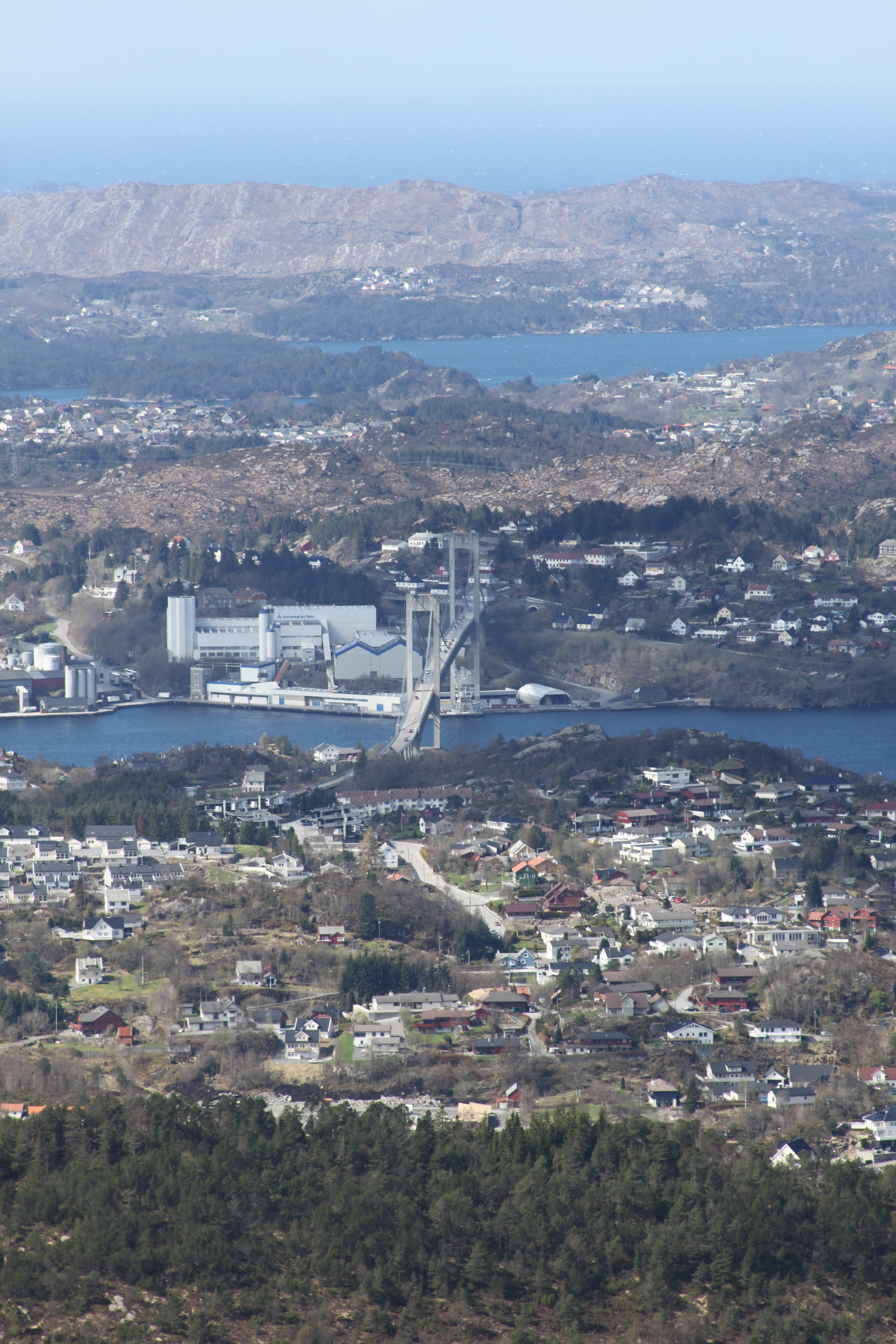
Bergen in the foreground, Sotra in the background

=== Tolls and auxiliary projects ===
Since the bridge would be the only road from the mainland to the archipelago, tolls could be collected in only one direction. The tolls were set to NOK 40 for semitrailers, NOK 30 for buses, NOK 20 for trucks, NOK 12 for cars, NOK 5 for motorcycles, NOK 4 for bicycles, NOK 2 for adults and 1 for children. Discounts were available at the same rates as for ferries. The four people who had worked the longest on the ferry were offered the job as toll plaza employees. From 1972, the bookkeeping of the company was transferred from the company's secretary to Bergens Privatbank's branch in Sotra, while the auditing was placed at Hordaland County Auditing.

In 1972, the company collected NOK 3.07 million in tolls, 21% more than estimated. By 1977, the annual income had reached NOK 5.03 million, which was up 28% from the estimates. From 1978, the tolls for people were removed, resulting in about NOK 1 million less revenue per year. One of the reasons for the removal of passenger tolls was the extra time used to count passengers, which increased the queues at the toll plaza, and that the company's debt would be covered anyway, even without the extra revenue. From 1 January 1981, scheduled buses were also exempt from tolls, under the condition that the funds saved were used by the bus companies to strengthen public transport on Sotra. From 1980, there was disagreement within the company as to whether the toll period should be extended to increase the subsidies to projects on Sotra and Øygarden, or if an as short as possible collection period was desirable. The board decided to terminate toll collections from 31 December 1983. A minority of the owners wanted to extend the period for another two years, which would have given an estimated additional NOK 20 million.

The company collected NOK 73.5 million in tolls, in addition to accumulating NOK 16.3 million in interest. Costs, mostly for running of the toll plaza, were NOK 7.6 million, in addition to financial costs of NOK 20.0 million. This gave a profit of NOK 62.4 million, including the necessary repayments of the initial loan. Because the debt had been financed with bonds, the company chose to place revenue in the bank with a higher interest instead of paying off the bonds faster. The preferred shares were repaid in 1980, while all bonds had been repaid by 1985. A/S Sotrabrua was formally liquidated on 9 February 1989.

Among the company's other goals was that of helping finance road projects on Øygarden. The most pressing issue was the section from Kolltveit on Store Sotra to the bridge, part of National Road 555. In 1976, the company issued NOK 5 million in an interest-free loan to the project, which was repaid in 1982 and 1983. Similar conditions were imposed for NOK 2 million for National Road 561 to Nordra Straumsundet and NOK 1.2 million for the establishment of the Solsvik–Rong Ferry in 1974. The rest of the subsidies were given as grants. The main project was National Road 561, which ran from Kollveit northwards through Øygarden, for which the company paid NOK 28.6 million. It paid a further NOK 9.3 million for other projects in Sotra and Øygarden, including connections to Turøyna and Misje.

== Future ==
=== Earlier proposals and planning ===
In the mid-2000s, congestion on National Road 555 between Straume and Bergen led to proposals for a four-lane motorway and a new crossing of Knarreviksundet. In 2005, daily traffic was estimated at 22,000 vehicles, and long queues during peak hours were common between Straume and Storavatnet.

The Norwegian Public Roads Administration considered four main alternatives for a new fixed link: a four-lane subsea tunnel, a second two-lane bridge immediately adjacent to the existing structure, a new four-lane bridge slightly to the south, and a new bridge considerably further south via Lerøyna and Bjelkarøyna. A light rail extension from Bergen to Sotra was also discussed as part of the long-term transport strategy.

=== Current development: Sotra Connection (Rv. 555 Sotrasambandet) ===
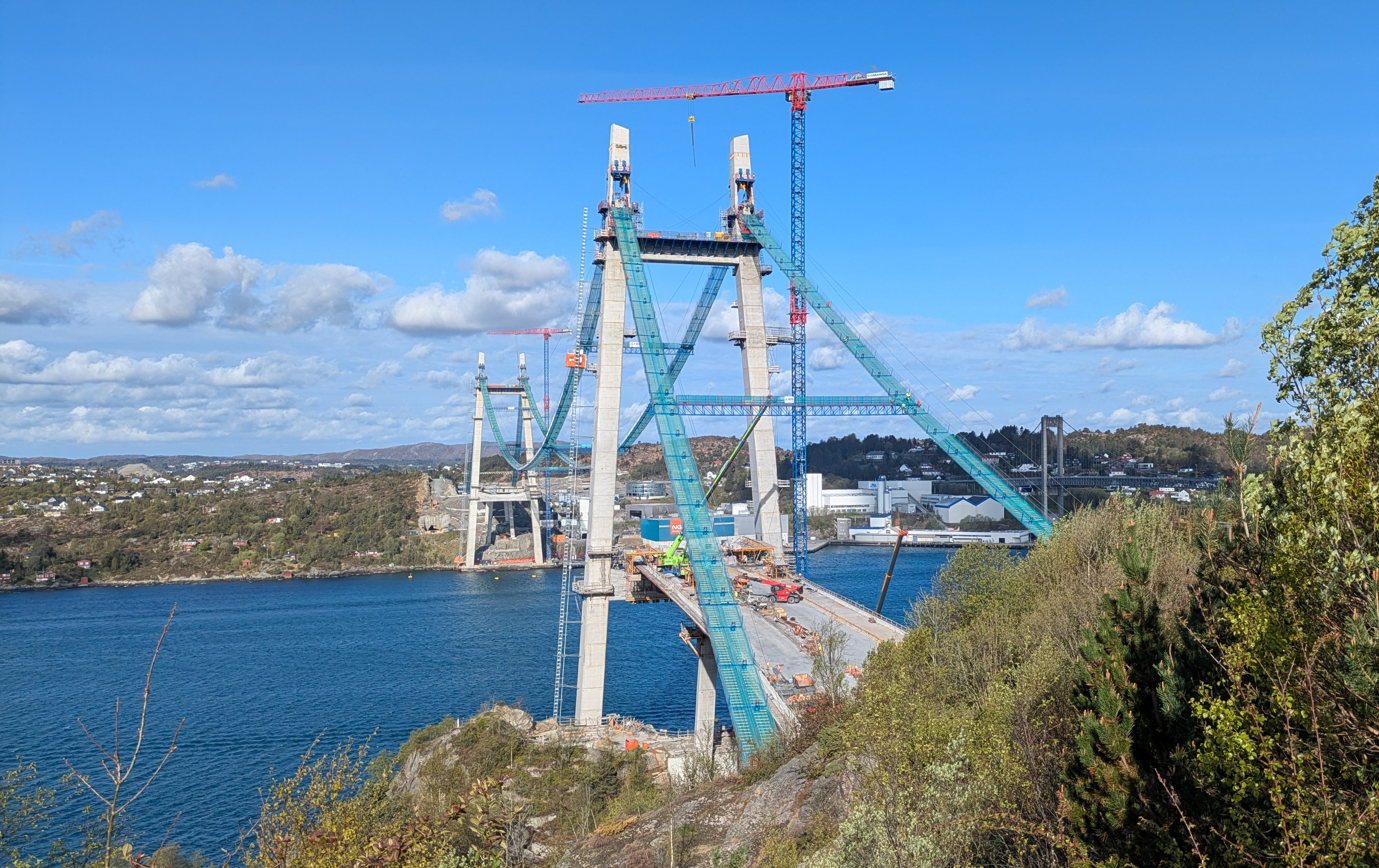
Construction of the new Bridge, 2026

Construction of a second Sotra Bridge commenced in spring 2023, with opening to traffic expected by June 2027. The new bridge will span approximately 900 m, carrying four motor vehicle lanes, separate pedestrian and cycle paths, and dedicated public transport lanes and ramps on parts of the structure. It forms part of the broader National Road 555 Sotra Connection (Norwegian: Rv. 555 Sotrasambandet), which will link Kolltveit in Øygarden Municipality to the Storavatnet junction in Bergen Municipality.

The full project comprises 9.4 km of new four-lane road, including several bridges and about 4.6 km of tunnels. Total estimated cost is NOK 23.1 billion (2022-kroner) (about €3 billion). In May 2022, the Norwegian Public Roads Administration awarded a NOK 19.8 billion (≈ €1.7 billion) public–private partnership (PPP) contract to the consortium *Sotra Link*, under which it will finance, design, build, operate, and maintain the road system for 25 years after opening.
