= Sirkka =

Finnish female given name

Sirkka is a Finnish female given name.

== Notable people ==
- Sirkka-Liisa Anttila, politician
- Sirkka Aro, writer
- Sirkka Garam, writer
- Sirkka-Liisa Hahmo, linguist
- Sirkka Hämäläinen, economist
- Sirkka Hirsjärvi, professor and writer
- Sirkka Karppanen, writer
- Sirkka Keiski, singer
- Sirkka-Liisa Kivelä, professor
- Sirkka-Liisa Kivine, Estonian athletics competitor
- Sirkka Klemetti, writer
- Sirkka-Liisa Konttinen, photographer
- Sirkka Kupila-Ahvenniemi, professor
- Sirkka Kuula, violin player
- Sirkka Laine, writer
- Sirkka Lamminen (Lampimäki), singer
- Sirkka-Liisa Landry, chess player
- Sirkka Lekman, teacher and politician
- Sirkka-Liisa Lonka, painter and graphic artist
- Sirkka Norrlund, hurdler
- Sirkka Polkunen, cross-country skier
- Sirkka Saari, Sirkka Suortti, writer
- Sirkka Saarinen, linguist and professori
- Sirkka Saarnio, actor
- Sirkka Salonen, Miss Finland 1938
- Sirkka Sari, actress
- Sirkka Selja, poet and writer
- Sirkka Sokka-Matikainen, archer
- Sirkka Soulanto, writer
- Sirkka Turkka, poet

== See also ==
- Sirkka Ausiku (born 1964), Namibian administrator and politician
- Karl-Wilhelm Sirkka (born 1939), Norwegian transport researcher, businessperson and politician
