= Olsvik Tunnel =

Road tunnel in Bergen, Norway

Olsvik Tunnel Olsviktunnelen
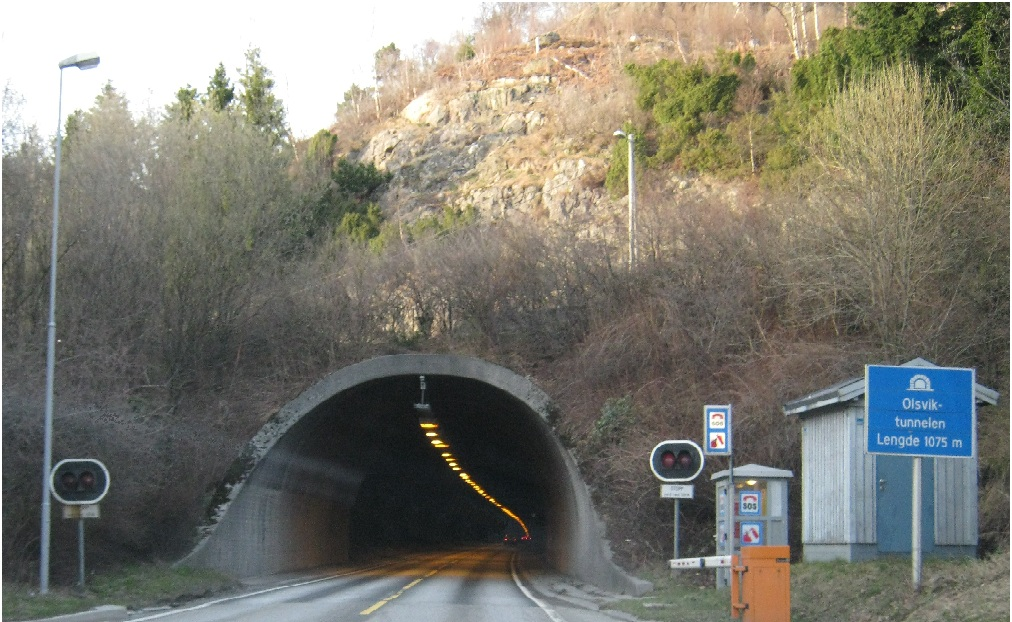
- Southern entrance
- Interactive map of Olsvik Tunnel; Olsviktunnelen

Overview
- Location: Olsvik, Bergen Municipality, Norway
- Coordinates: 60°23′05″N 005°12′58″E
- Status: In use
- Route: Norwegian County Road 562

Operation
- Opened: 12 December 1992
- Owner: Vestland County Municipality
- Operator: Statens vegvesen

Technical
- Length: 1,074 meters (3,524 ft)
- No. of lanes: 2

The Olsvik Tunnel (Norwegian: Olsviktunnelen) is a 1,074-meter (3,524 ft) long road tunnel in Bergen Municipality in Vestland county, Norway. It's located about 7 kilometres (4.3 mi) west of the centre of the city of Bergen. The tunnel opened on 12 December 1992 and is part of County Road 562. The tunnel connects the southern end of Askøy Bridge to National Road 555, one of the main highways in western Bergen.
