= Gravdal =

Gravdal may refer to several places in Norway:

- Gravdal, Bergen, a neighborhood in the city of Bergen in Vestland county
- Gravdal, Nordland, a village in Vestvågøy municipality in Nordland county
- Gravdal, Vestfold, a village in Sandefjord municipality in Vestfold county
