= Norwegian National Road 555 =

Road in Norway

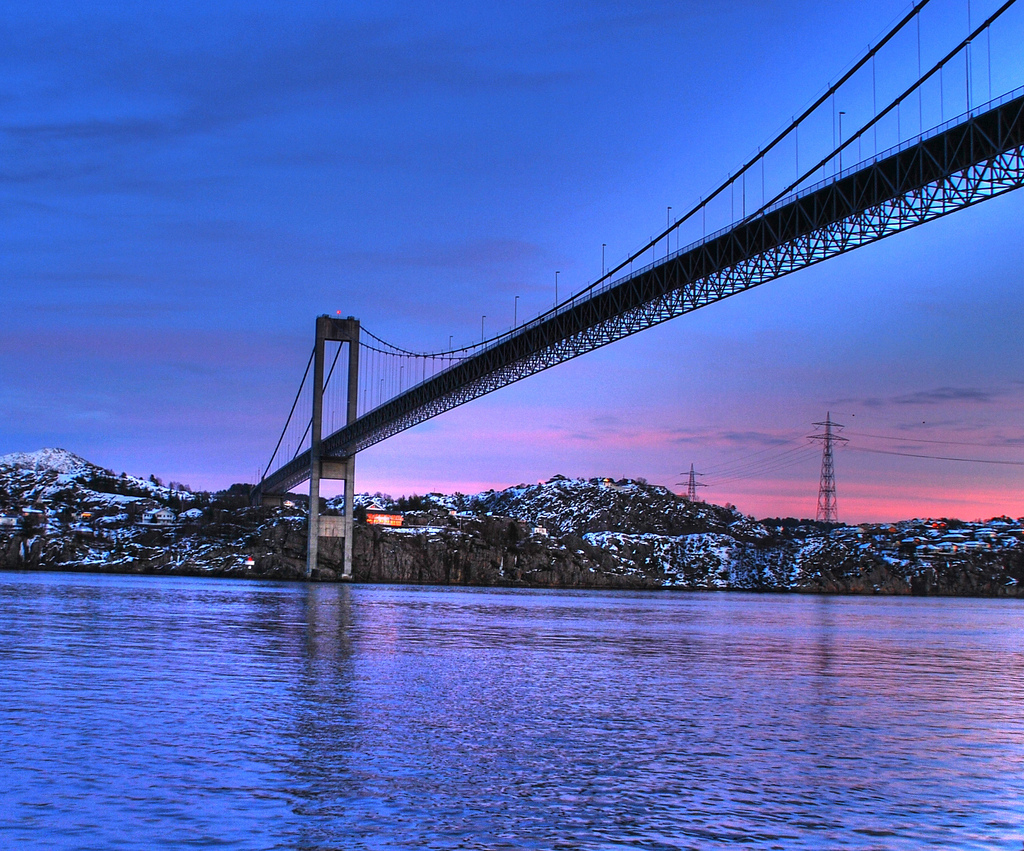
The Sotra Bridge carries National Road 555 over Knarreviksundet

National Road 555 (Norwegian: Riksvei 555) is a 27.8 kilometers (17.3 mi) long national road which runs from the city center of Bergen to Kolltveit in Øygarden Municipality in Vestland county, Norway. The road crosses the Sotra Bridge and passes through several tunnels, including the Nygård Tunnel, Damsgård Tunnel, and Lyderhorn Tunnel.

== Route ==
In Bergen, the road has two branches, one two-lane from Nøstet via O.J. Brochs gate and on four-lane from Nygårdstangen, and the interchange with E16 and E39. The latter runs through the Nygård Tunnel before merging with the other branch and running across the six-lane Puddefjord Bridge. There, County Road 540 branches off into the Løvstakken Tunnel and County Road 582 branches off towards Laksevåg. 555 continues through the Damsgård Tunnel as a four-lane motorway, and at Nygård traffic towards the city center passes a toll collection and County Road 582 again intersects with 555. The motorway passes through the Lianakk Tunnel before having an interchange with County Road 557. In the future, this will be the a four-lane motorway heading south through the Knappe Tunnel. 555 continues through the Lyderhorn Tunnel before passing through an interchange at Loddefjord and then one at Storavatnet. At the latter, County Road 562 branches off towards Askøy, and 555 is reduced to a two-lane limited-access road. It passes through two short tunnels before having two interchanges at the Drotningsvik area. It then crosses Knarreviksundet on the Sotra Bridge, a suspension bridge. The road then enters Fjell and the island of Litlesotra. It then has two intersections at Knarrevik, one at Straume and crosses over to the island of Bildøyna where it has two interchanges. It then crosses over to the island of Store Sotra and enters the Kolltveit Tunnel. National Road 555 terminates at a roundabout west of the tunnel, with Country Road 555 running south and Country Road 561 running north.

Plans are being made for replacing the Sotra Bridge to increase its capacity. In June 2010, Hordaland County Council decided that an extension of the Bergen Light Rail to Sotra was to be made part of the extension plans in the period until 2040, for which a bridge would have to be chosen for the light rail to make use of the existing infrastructure.
