= Storavatnet =

Body of water

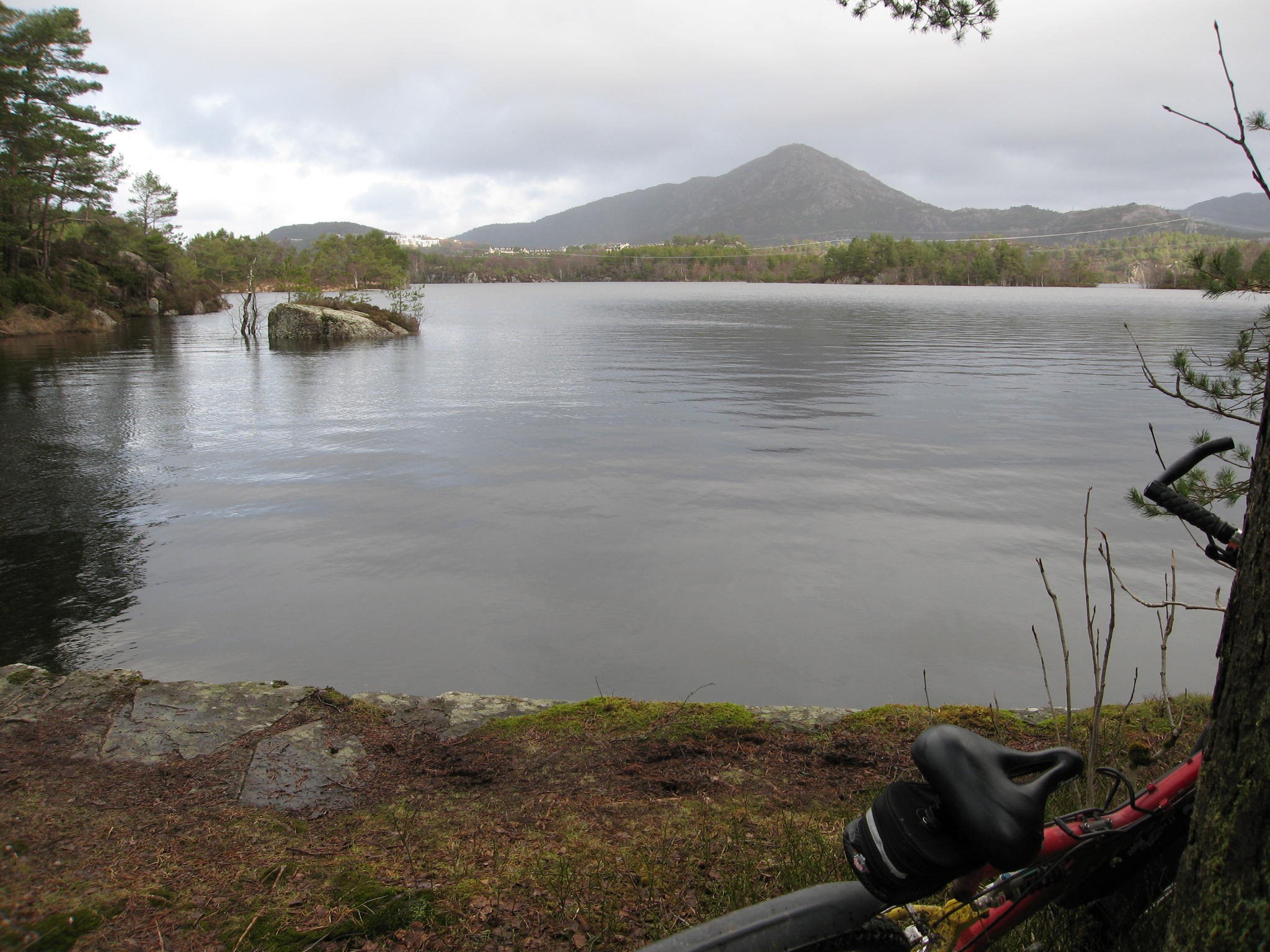
- Interactive map of Storavatnet
- Location: Bergen Municipality, Vestland
- Coordinates: 60.35561°N 5.21624°E
- Basin countries: Norway
- Max. length: 2.2 kilometres (1.4 mi)
- Max. width: 900 metres (3,000 ft)
- Surface area: 1 km^{2} (0.39 sq mi)
- Surface elevation: 40 metres (130 ft)
- References: NVE

Storavatnet is a lake in Bergen Municipality in Vestland county, Norway. The 2.2-kilometre (1.4 mi) lake is located just southwest of the village of Loddefjord in the borough of Laksevåg, about 10 kilometres (6.2 mi) southwest of the centre of the city of Bergen.

There is a small man-made dam on the southwest coast, regulating the one natural outlet for the 1-square-kilometre (250-acre) lake. The major highway junction of Norwegian County Road 562 and Norwegian National Road 555 lies on the northern shore of the lake. Route 562 heads north to the Askøy Bridge going to the island of Askøy. Route 555 heads west to the Sotra Bridge which goes to the island of Sotra. The terminal station in Loddefjord, near the lake is the proposed end of the new Loddefjord branch of the Bergen Light Rail system.

== See also ==
- List of lakes in Norway
