= Knarreviksundet =

Fjord in Vestland, Norway

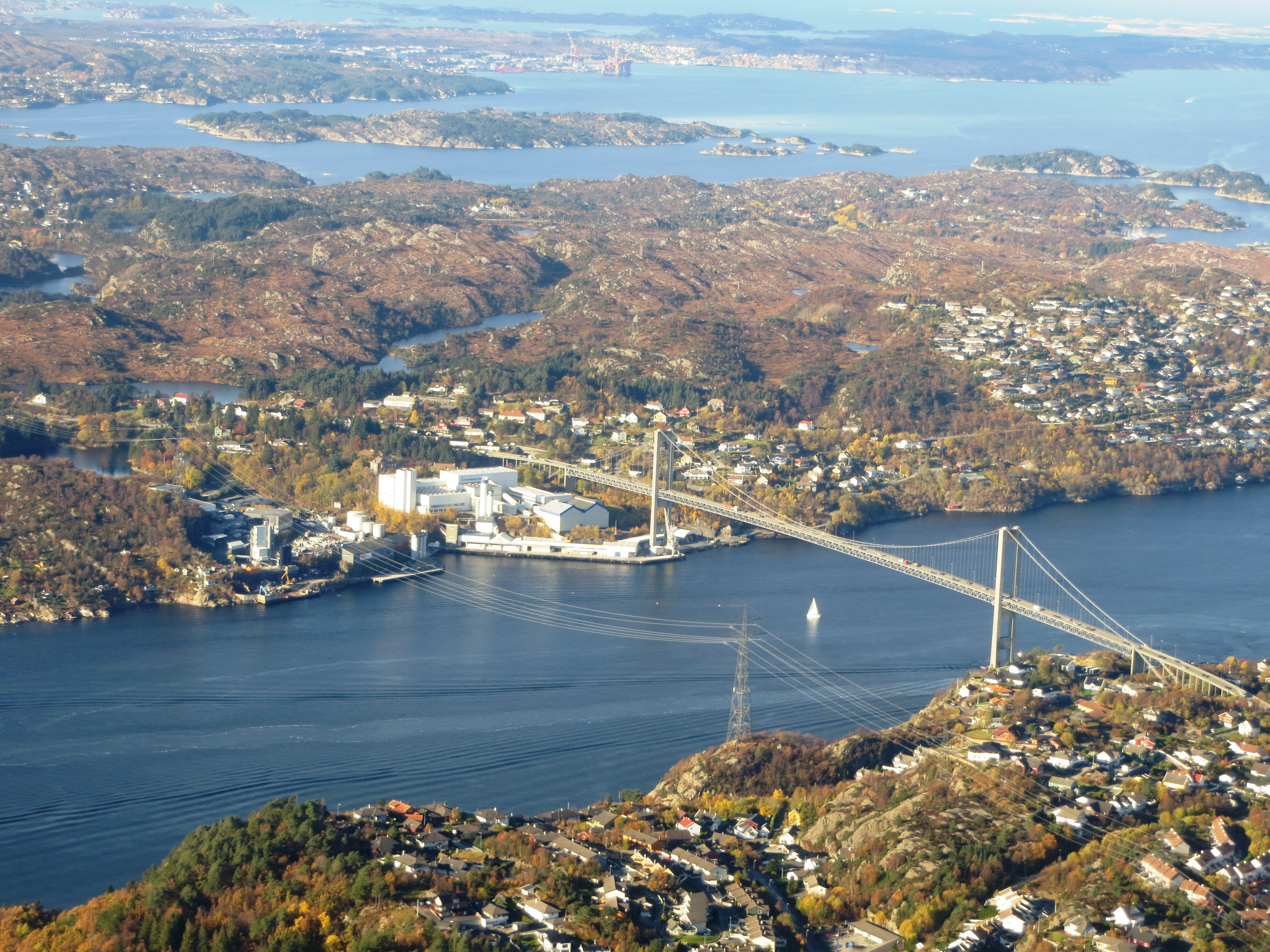
- View of the strait
- Interactive map of Knarreviksundet
- Location: Vestland county, Norway
- Coordinates: 60.3726°N 5.1654°E
- Type: Strait
- Basin countries: Norway

Knarreviksundet is a strait between the island of Litlesotra in Øygarden Municipality and Drotningsvik in Bergen Municipality in Vestland county, Norway. The Sotra Bridge crosses the Knarreviksundet.
