= Stongafjell Tunnel =

Road tunnel in Vestland, Norway

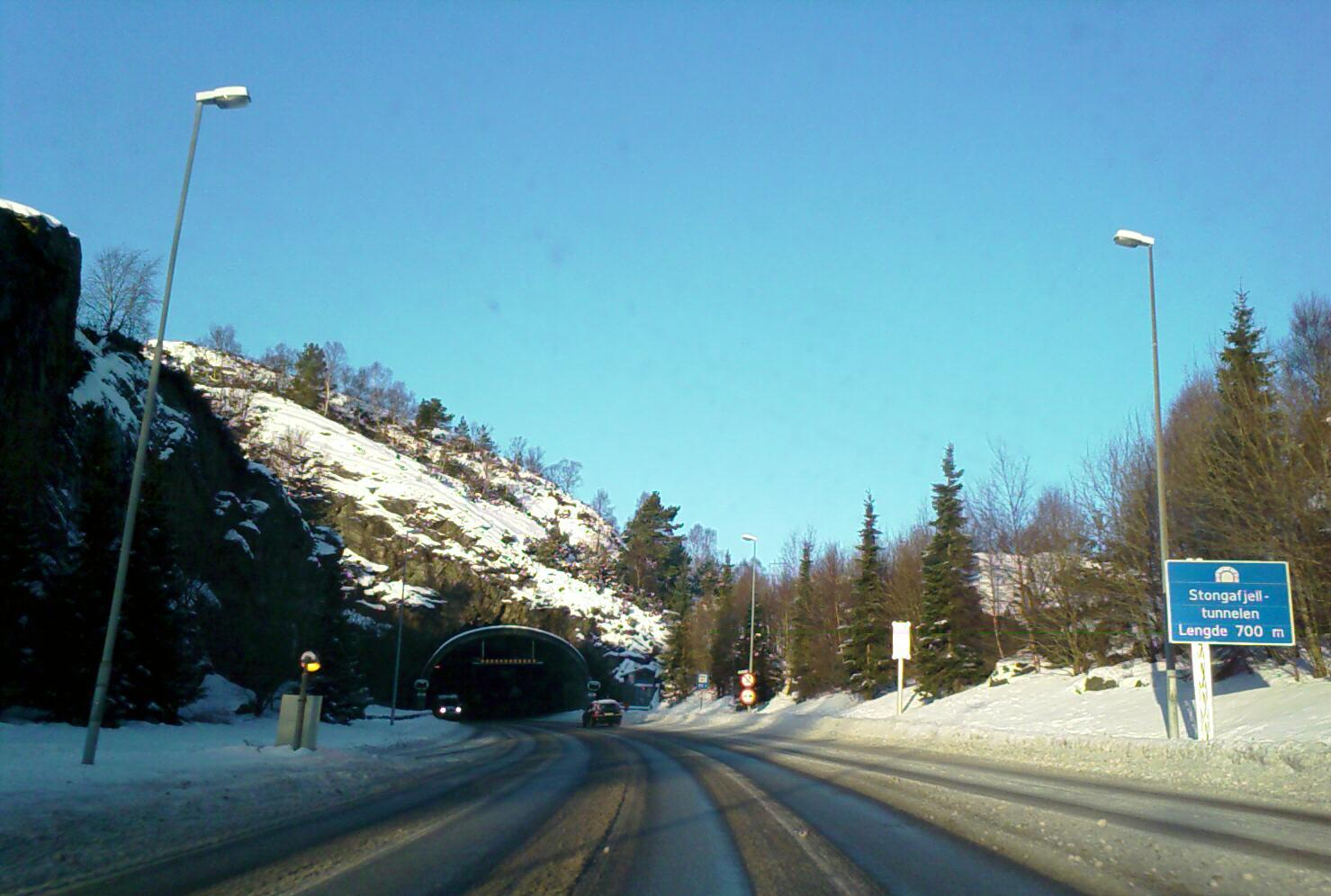
- Southern entrance
- Interactive map of Stongafjell Tunnel

Overview
- Location: Askøy Municipality, Norway
- Coordinates: 60.4057°N 5.2005°E
- Status: In use
- Route: Fv562

Operation
- Opened: December 1991
- Owner: Vestland County Municipality
- Operator: Statens vegvesen
- Vehicles per day: 11,050 (2004)

Technical
- Length: 694 meters (2,277 ft)
- No. of lanes: 2

The Stongafjell Tunnel (Norwegian: Stongafjelltunnelen) is a 694-meter (2,277 ft) long road tunnel along County Road 562 in Askøy Municipality in Vestland county, Norway. It is located on the southern part of the island of Askøy, going through the small mountain Stongafjell, about 1 kilometre (0.62 mi) west of the village of Kleppestø. It was opened in December 1991 to connect this road to the newly constructed Askøy Bridge.

In 2004, the tunnel had the average traffic of 11,050 vehicles per day, making it part of the section of road with the most traffic in all of Askøy municipality. In 2011, Hordaland County Municipality spent 3.7 million kr to upgrade the electrical systems in the tunnel.
