= Norwegian County Road 562 =

Road in Vestland county, Norway

County Road 562
- Bokmål: Fylkesvei 562; Nynorsk: Fylkesveg 562

Route information
- Length: 27.3 km (17.0 mi)

Major junctions
- South end: Bergen
- North end: Askøy

Location
- Country: Norway

Highway system
- Roads in Norway; National Roads; County Roads

County Road 562 (Norwegian: Fylkesvei 562) is a county road in Vestland county, Norway. The 23.7-kilometre (14.7 mi) long road runs from the northern shore of the lake Storavatnet in the city of Bergen on the Bergen Peninsula, over the Askøy Bridge, and across the western part of the island of Askøy, ending at the village of Skråmestø.

Prior to 1 January 2010, the road was a Norwegian national road and it was called National Road 562 (Norwegian: Riksvei 562). On 1 January 2010, it was transferred to the county.

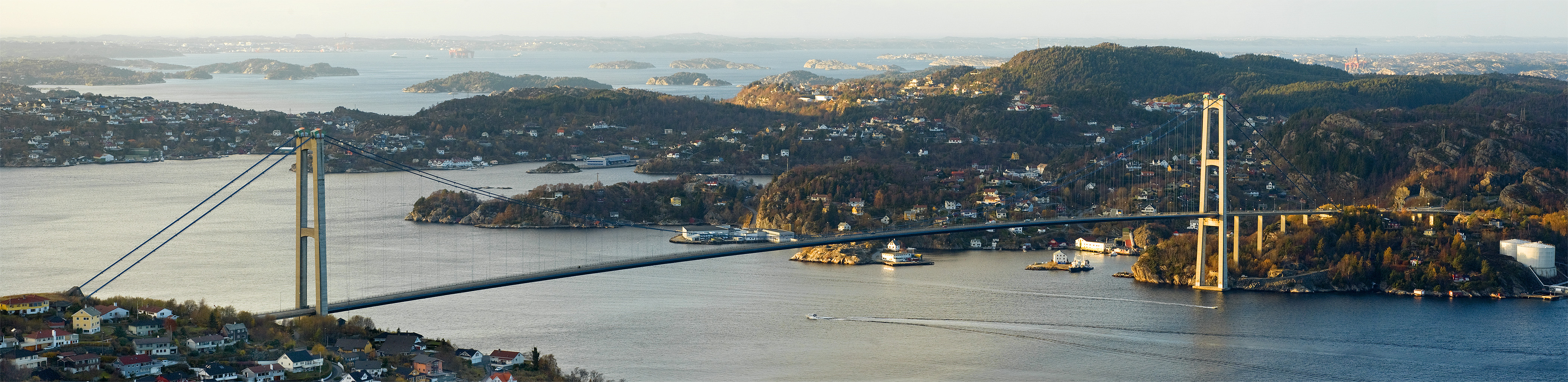
The Askøy Bridge, which carries Fv562

== Route ==
The road branches off from National Road 555 and runs through the Olsvik Tunnel, over Byfjorden on the Askøy Bridge, and then through the Stongafjell Tunnel. It continues across the western part of the island of Askøy in Askøy Municipality and terminates at the village Skråmestø on the northern part of the island.
