= Rutelaget Askøy–Bergen =

Defunct Norwegian ferry and bus company

Rutelaget Askøy–Bergen AS
- Type: Private
- Industry: Transport
- Founded: 1950
- Defunct: 1995
- Fate: Merger
- Successor: Fjord Line
- Headquarters: Askøy Municipality, Norway,

Rutelaget Askøy–Bergen AS or A–B was a ferry and bus operating company that provided services between Askøy Municipality and Bergen Municipality in Norway. Founded in 1950, it operated a car ferry across the sound, and bus traffic in both Askøy Municipality and Bergen Municipality. The ferry route was discontinued in 1992 when the Askøy Bridge opened. It also operated ferries between Bergen and Stavanger and in the Boknafjord. In 1992 the subsidiary Fjord Line was established, providing cruiseferry services from Bergen and Egersund to Hanstholm in Denmark. The two companies merged in 1995, and were subsequently bought by Bergen Nordhordland Rutelag, after a bid from Color Line was found to be too low.
