= Oslo Nye Sparebank =

Former bank in Oslo, Norway

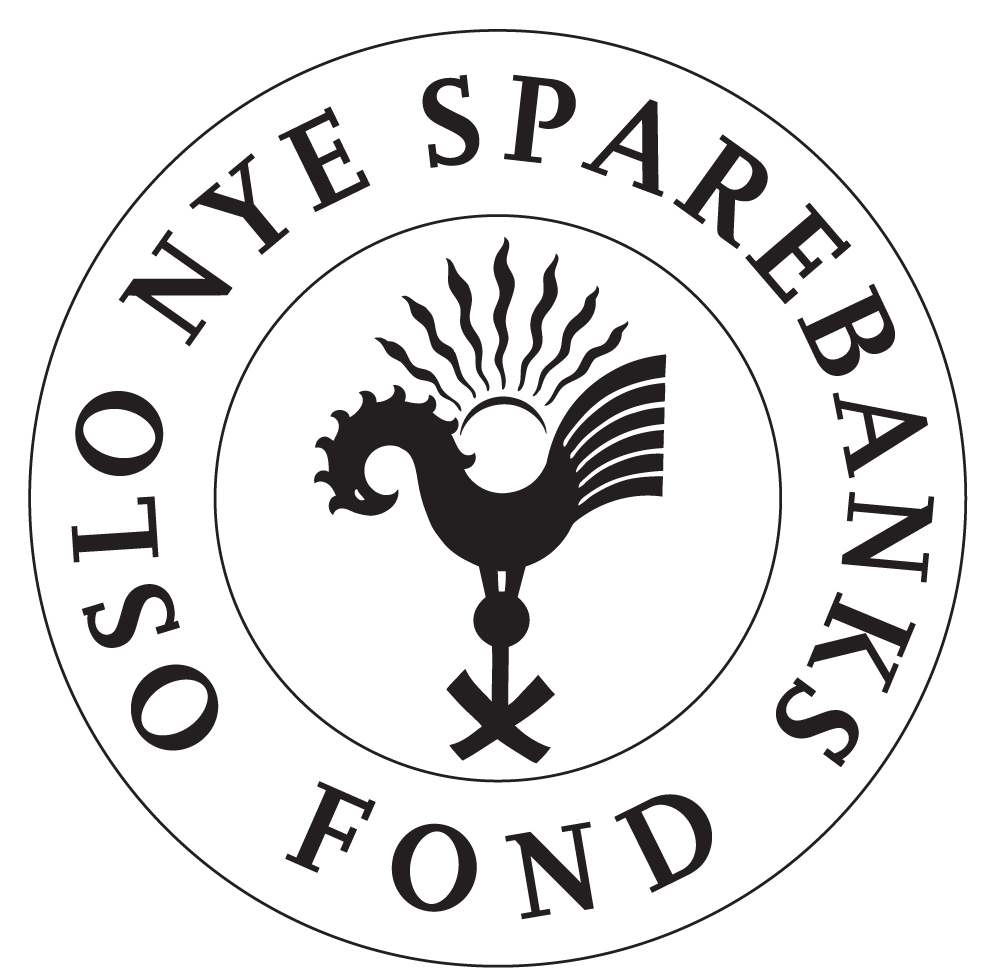
The logo of Oslo Nye Sparebank

Oslo Nye Sparebank was a savings bank based in Oslo, Norway. It was established by Bondeungdomslaget i Oslo in 1921, which bought half the primary capital certificates. The bank had Nynorsk as it language of business. It was bought by Vestlandsbanken, a Bergen-based Nynorsk-bank, in 1975, for 1.1 million Norwegian krone. The sales price was transferred to Oslo Nye Sparebanks Fond, a charitable foundation which grants money to Nynorsk-based activities in the Oslo area.
