= Johan Sørensen (politician) =

Norwegian politician

Johan Sørensen is a Norwegian former politician for the Liberal Party. He was mayor of Askøy Municipality from 1968 to 1975, and deputy chair of the planning committee for and later the toll company for the Askøy Bridge from 1960 to 1974, and 1974 to 1993, respectively. He worked as an engineer for the Norwegian Public Roads Administration.
