= Norwegian Talc =

Norwegian Talc AS is a manufacturer of talc located in Knarrevik in Øygarden Municipality, Norway. It is owned by Omya.

== History ==
In 1989, the company, which at the time had plants in Knarrevik, Altermark in Mo i Rana, and Framfjord in Vik, was sold to the Engstrøm Group of Sweden. Previously, the company had been owned by the Horn family of Bergen.
