= Olav Bjørkaas =

Norwegian politician (1914–2003)

Olav Bjørkaas (7 October 1914 – 3 January 2003) was a Norwegian politician for the Labour Party. He was mayor of Askøy Municipality from 1960 to 1967, and chair of the planning committee for and later the toll company for the Askøy Bridge from 1960 to 1974, and 1974 to 1993, respectively.
