= Straume, Øygarden =

Village in Øygarden Municipality, Norway

Straume
- Village
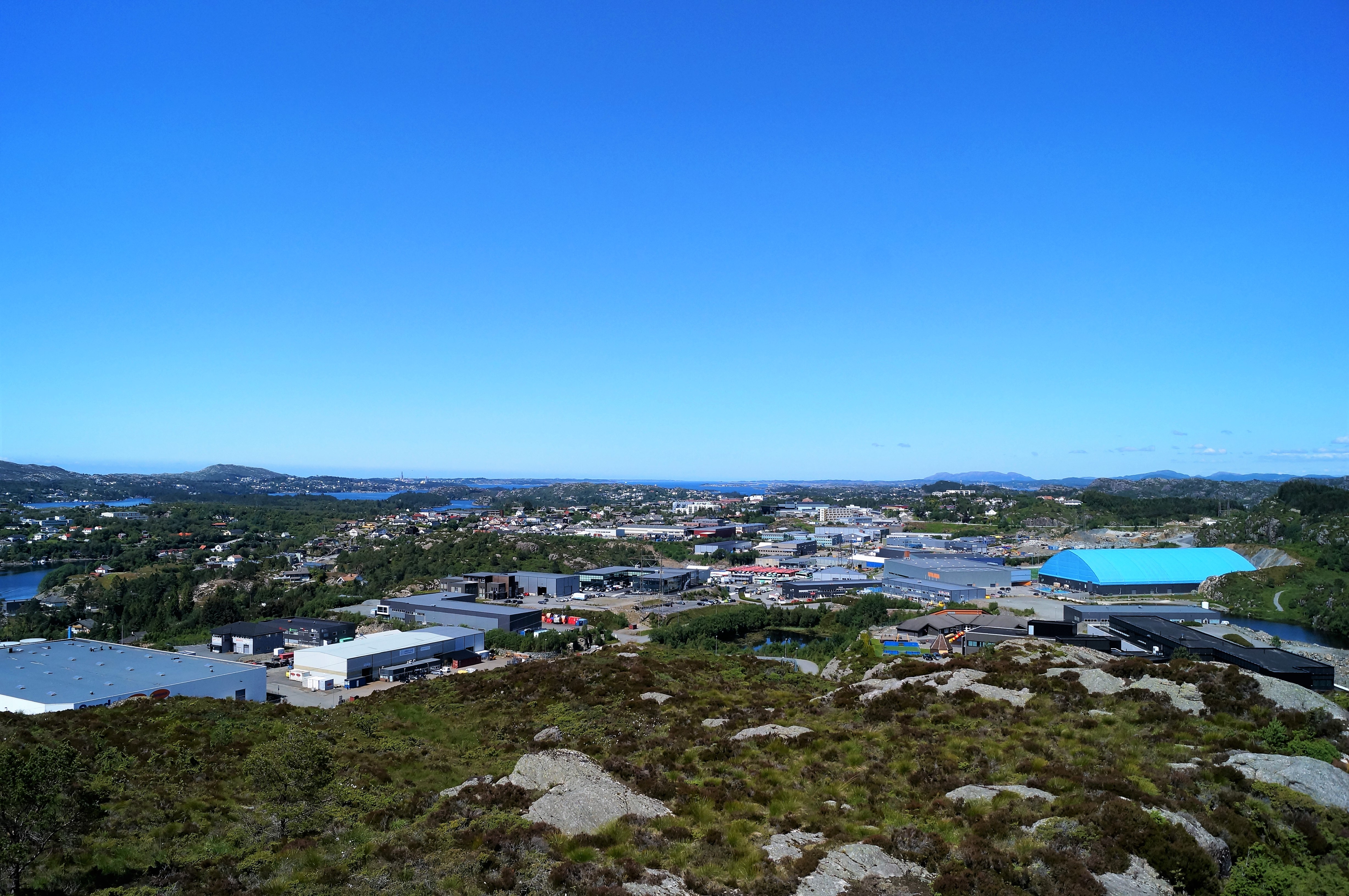
- View of the village
- Interactive map of Straume
- Coordinates: 60.36131°N 5.12199°E
- Country: Norway
- Region: Western Norway
- County: Vestland
- District: Midhordland
- Municipality: Øygarden Municipality

Area
  - Total: 7.86 km^{2} (3.03 sq mi)
- Elevation: 33 m (108 ft)

Population (2025)
  - Total: 12,971
  - Density: 1,650/km^{2} (4,300/sq mi)
- Time zone: UTC+01:00 (CET)
  - Summer (DST): UTC+02:00 (CEST)
- Post Code: 5353 Straume

Straume is the administrative center of Øygarden Municipality in Vestland county, Norway. The village is located on the western part of the island of Litlesotra, just south of the village of Foldnes and southwest of the village of Knarrvika. Straume is the centre of government for the municipality as well as the centre of commerce for the municipality. The large Sartor Senter, a regional shopping center is located in Straume.

A bridge on Norwegian National Road 555 connects Straume to the island of Bildøyna, immediately to the west. This bridge is the only road connection from the mainland to Øygarden Municipality.

Statistics Norway groups Straume and the neighboring Knarrevik together as one large urban area for statistical purposes. The 7.86-square-kilometre (1,940-acre) urban area of Knarrevik/Straume has a population (2025) of 12,971 and a population density of 1,650 inhabitants per square kilometre (4,300/sq mi).
