= Danske Bank (Norway) =

- Company type: Private
- Industry: Financial services
- Founded: 1859
- Headquarters: Trondheim, Norway
- Area served: Norway
- Key people: Trond F. Mellingsæter (CEO)
- Revenue: NOK 1,970 million (2005)
- Net income: ▲NOK 622 million (2005)
- Number of employees: Approximately 1,000 (2011)
- Parent: Danske Bank
- Website: danskebank.no

Danske Bank, formerly named Fokus Bank, is the Norwegian operations of the Danish Danske Bank. It has long been one of the largest banks in Scandinavia.

Danske Bank has 41 local branches spread around all of Norway. The main office is in Trondheim and the bank employs approximately 1,000 workers. The bank has 210,000 private customers and 15,000 business customers.

The bank has two subsidiaries:

- Danske Capital AS manages money market, obligation and mutual funds with the brand name Danske Invest.
- The real estate agent Fokus Krogsveen AS, branded as Krogsveen.

== History ==
The banks that made up Danske Bank were all incorporated between 1868 and 1932.

Danske Bank is the result of merge between of all together seven regional banks in Norway and was noted on Oslo Stock Exchange. The merger was between Buskerudbanken, Bøndernes Bank, Forretningsbanken, Vestlandsbanken in 1987 and with Tromsbanken (1990), Rogalandsbanken (1991) and Samvirkebanken (1993). In 1999 it was acquired by Danske Bank, and became part of the Danske Bank Corporation on May 7, 1999.
