= Nygårdstangen =

Peninsula in Bergen, Norway

Coordinates: 60.3836°N 5.3358°E

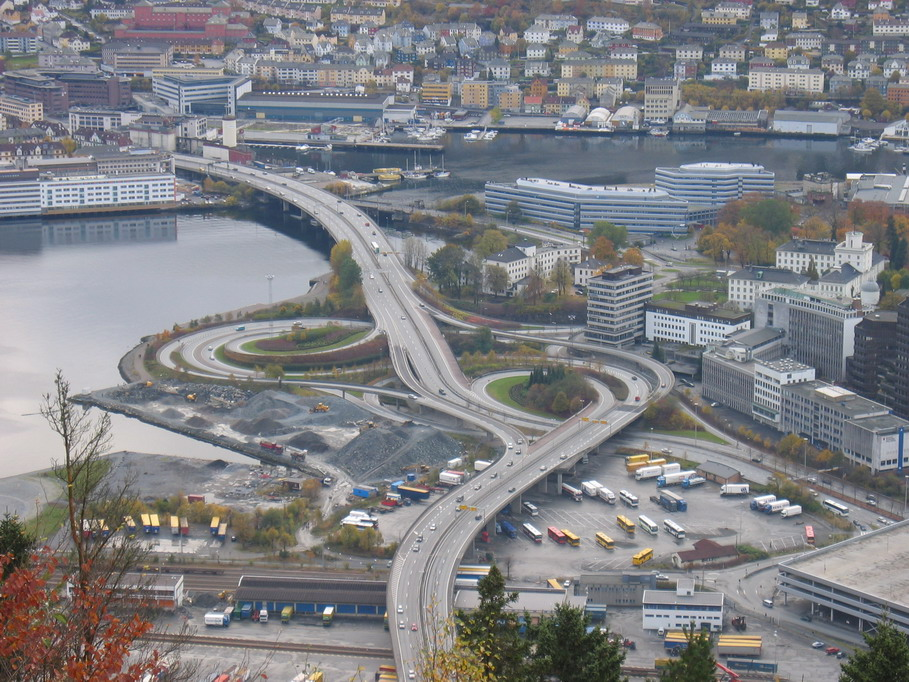
Nygårdstangen in 2004, before the fire station was built

Nygårdstangen is a small peninsula on the southeastern end of the city center of Bergen in Vestland county, Norway. The neighborhood borders the Store Lungegårdsvann bay. Most of the peninsula is occupied by an interchange. It is the meeting place of E16, E39, and National Road 555. To the northeast, the Fløyfjell Tunnel, where E16 and E39 run commonly, mouthes out into interchange, as does E39 from the south via the Nygård Bridge. To the west, 555 terminates at the intersection, arriving via the Nygård Tunnel. The interchange also allows access to the city center via Fjøsangerveien. Also located at Nygårdstangen is Bergen Fire Station and one campus of the Bergen University College.
