= Gravdalsvatnet =

Lake in Vestland, Norway

- Interactive map of Gravdalsvatnet
- Location: Bergen Municipality, Vestland
- Coordinates: 60.38258°N 5.26227°E
- Basin countries: Norway
- Max. length: 825 metres (2,707 ft)
- Max. width: 375 metres (1,230 ft)
- Surface area: 0.21 km^{2} (52 acres)
- Shore length^{1}: 2.3 kilometres (1.4 mi)
- Surface elevation: 12 metres (39 ft)
- References: NVE
- ^{1} Shore length is not a well-defined measure.

Gravdalsvatnet is a lake in the western part of Bergen Municipality in Vestland county, Norway. The 0.21-square-kilometre (52-acre) lake is located immediately south of the village of Gravdal in the borough of Laksevåg, west of the center of the city of Bergen. National Road 555 runs along the south shore, just east of the mountain Lyderhorn.
