= Bergen Port =

Norwegian seaport

Coordinates: 60°23′31″N 5°18′43″E

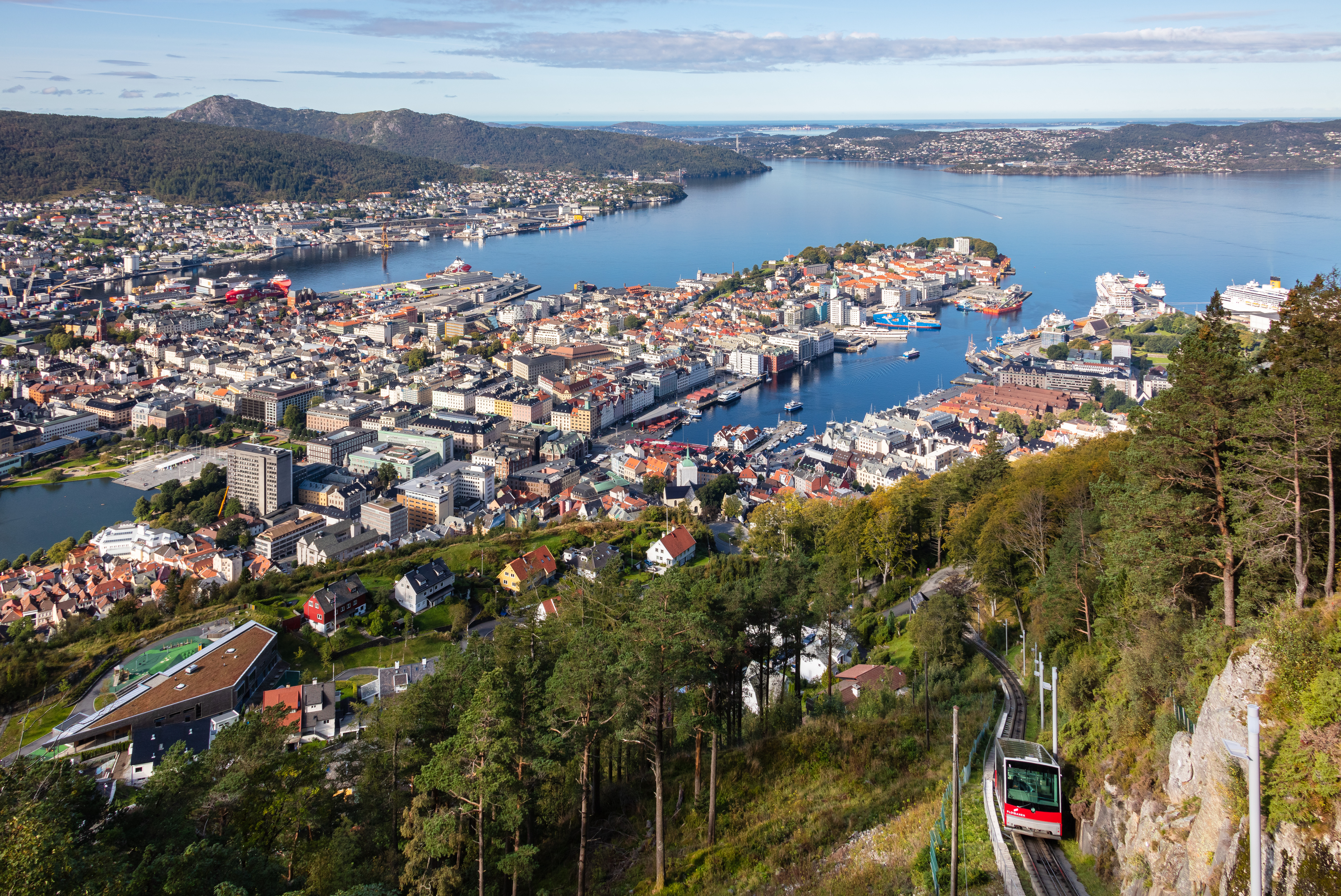
Picture of Bergen Port

Bergen Port is an international seaport located in the centre of the city of Bergen, in Bergen Municipality, Norway, operated by Bergen Port Authority. Port locations are featured along most of the two bays in Bergen, Vågen and Puddefjorden. In 2006 it served 27,342 calls with 68 million tonnes of cargo and 109,000 containers as well as 600,000 cruise ship passengers. The port has 5,500 meters of quays with draft at 11 meters. Warehouses with capacity of 50,000 square meters are co-located with the port

On June 17, 2015 they added a "shorepower" connection that allows ships with the facility to plugin and turn off their engines whilst in port.

== Passenger routes ==
=== Cruiseferries ===
- Fjord Line to (Stavanger, Hirtshals)
- Hurtigruten (Coastal Express calls daily at ports north to Kirkenes)

=== Fast ferries ===
- Fjord1 Fylkesbaatane to (Flåm, Sogndalsfjøra, and Selje)
- Tide (Haugesund, Stavanger, Sunnhordaland, Austevoll)
