= Vestlandsbanken =

Norwegian bank

Vestlandsbanken was a bank based in Bergen, Norway. It was established in 1926 and explicitly did all its business in Nynorsk. In 1975, it merged with the Oslo-based Oslo Nye Sparebank, also it a Nynorsk-bank. In 1987, Vestlandsbanken merged with Bøndernes Bank, Forretningsbanken and Buskerudbanken to create Fokus Bank.
