= Cross Link =

Road construction project in Norway

Coordinates: 60°35′27″N 5°02′50″E

Cross Link (Norwegian: Tverrsambandet) is a proposed fixed link in Nordhordland in Vestland county, Norway. The proposed road would connect the islands of Øygarden Municipality and Askøy Municipality with Alver Municipality on the mainland, thus improving the transportation in the area.

== Proposed route ==
Specifically, the proposal includes the following segments:

- a ferry from the Kollsnes area of Øygarden Municipality in the west to somewhere south of the island of Herdla in Askøy Municipality
- a subsea road tunnel from the same area to the island of Holsnøy in Alver Municipality
- a road from the tunnel across the island of Holsnøy
- a new subsea road tunnel connecting the new road on Holsnøy to the island of Radøy.

Although not in any public proposals, there have been private proposals to develop Mjølkevikvarden in Askøy as a site for a new port for Bergen. This would only be possible if the Cross Link was built. Mongstad is one of several proposed locations for the new port, and the Cross Link would make it a more central location. The Cross Link would allow a small amount of traffic to bypass the main road system in central Bergen and would allow much faster transport between two large industrial sites, Kollsnes and Mongstad. A toll company has been established by the involved municipalities, although politicians from Nordhordland have stated that their top priority is to build the Nyborg Tunnel, which will reduce travel time towards Bergen, and a road package which involves upgrading part of the county road network in the area.
