= Gravdal, Bergen =

Neighborhood of Bergen, Norway

Coordinates: 60°23′20″N 5°15′39″E

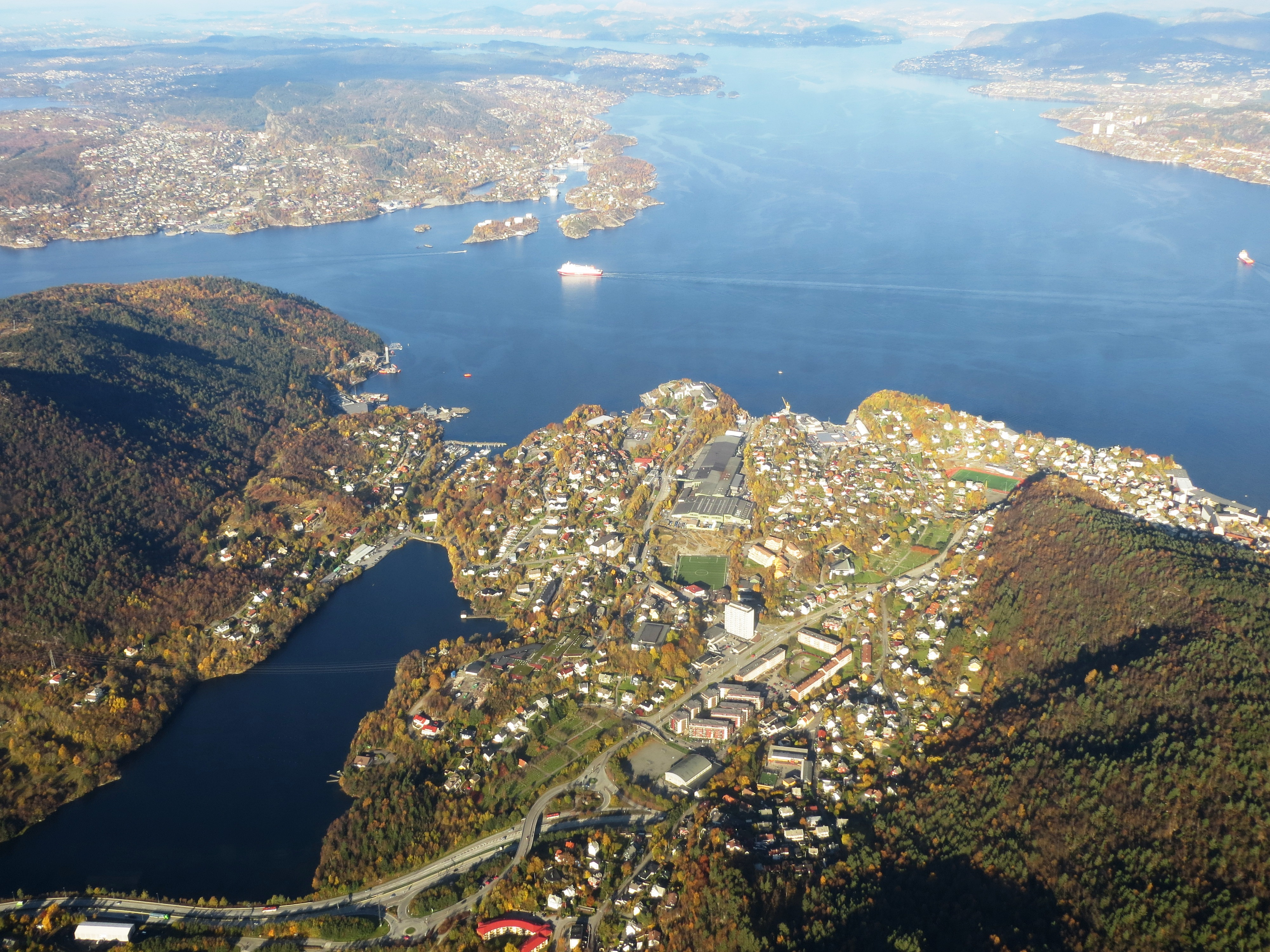
Aerial view of the Gravdal area in western Bergen

Gravdal is a neighborhood in the city of Bergen in Vestland county, Norway. It is located in the borough of Laksevåg in the valley between the mountains Damsgårdsfjellet and Lyderhorn. The Byfjorden flows past to the north and the lake Gravdalsvatnet to the south. The western end of the Damsgård Tunnel is located in Gravdal. Nygård Church is also located in Gravdal.
