= Bergen Port Authority =

Port in Norway

Bergen og Omegn havnevesen IKS
- Type: Municipal owned
- Industry: Port authority
- Headquarters: Bergen, Norway
- Area served: Hordaland
- Revenue: ▲NOK 99 million (2006)
- Operating income: NOK 32 million (2006)
- Net income: NOK 6 million (2006)
- Website: www.bergenhavn.no

Bergen Port Authority (Norwegian: Bergen og Omegn havnevesen) is an intermunicipal enterprise owned by the municipalities of Alver, Askøy, Austrheim, Bergen, Bjørnafjorden, Fedje, and Øygarden as well as Vestland county municipality. The port authority operates all seaports in the designated area, including Bergen Port and the oil refinery Mongstad. There are also bunkering terminals, a dry dock and floating docks within the jurisdiction of the authority.
