= Knarrevik =

Village in Øygarden Municipality, Norway

Knarrevik Knarrvika
- Village
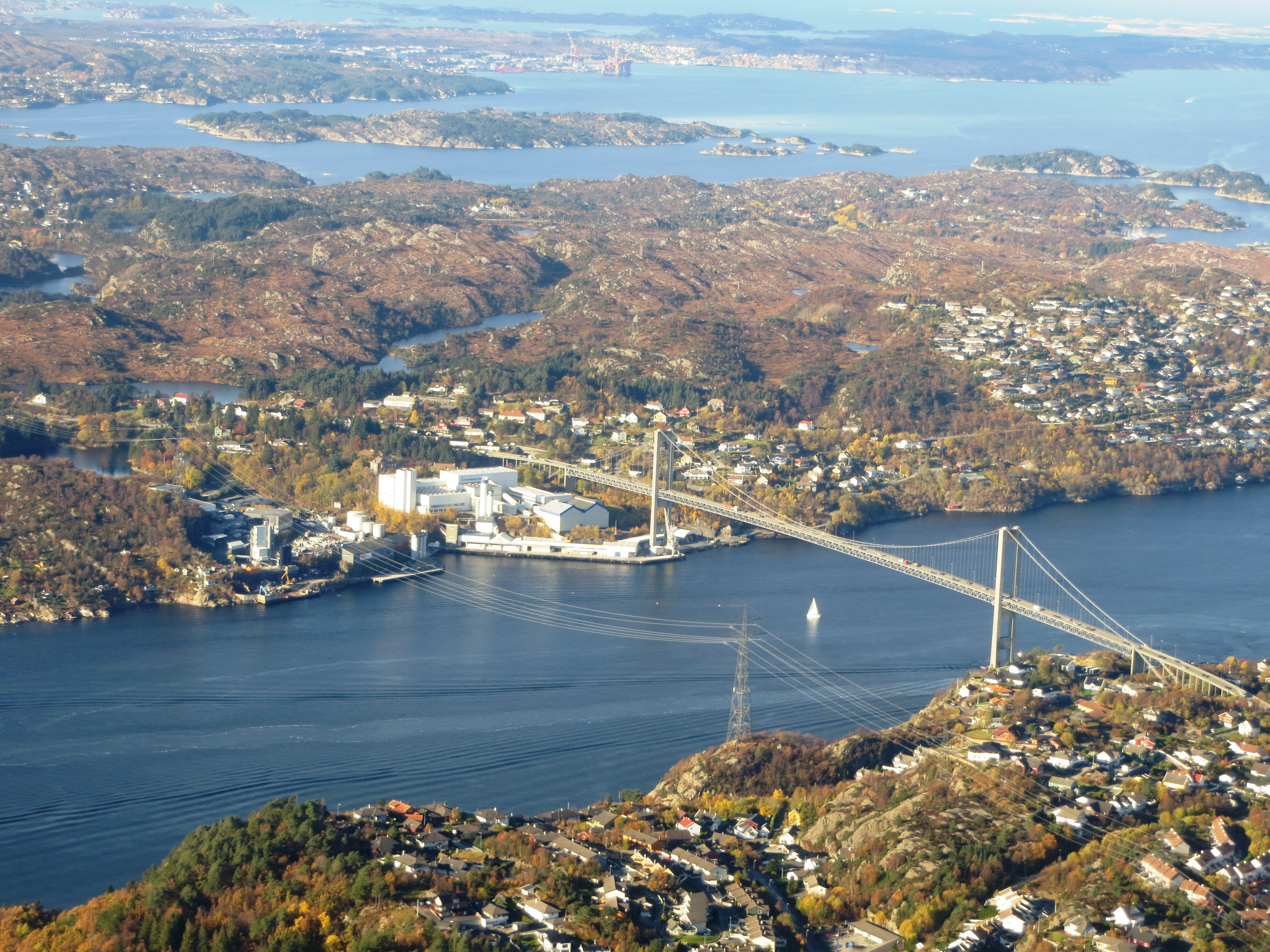
- Interactive map of the village
- Coordinates: 60.37074°N 5.1532°E
- Country: Norway
- Region: Western Norway
- County: Vestland
- District: Midhordland
- Municipality: Øygarden Municipality
- Elevation: 43 m (141 ft)
- Time zone: UTC+01:00 (CET)
  - Summer (DST): UTC+02:00 (CEST)
- Post Code: 5355 Knarrevik

Knarrevik or Knarrvika is a village in Øygarden Municipality in Vestland county, Norway. It is located along the Byfjorden on the eastern coast of the island of Litlesotra, just north of the village of Straume. The western end of the Sotra Bridge lies at Knarrvika.

Statistics Norway groups Straume and the neighboring Knarrevik together as one large urban area for statistical purposes. The 7.86-square-kilometre (1,940-acre) urban area of Knarrevik/Straume has a population (2025) of 12,971 and a population density of 1,650 inhabitants per square kilometre (4,300/sq mi).
