= Karl-Wilhelm Sirkka =

Norwegian politician

Karl-Wilhelm Sirkka (born 4 October 1939) is a Norwegian transport researcher, businessperson and politician for the Conservative Party.

He was born in Vadsø Municipality. He has his education from the Norwegian School of Management, the Institute of Transport Economics and the University of Tromsø and has worked as a researcher at Molde University College. He has also edited the newspaper Finnmark Tidende and been chief executive of Fiskeindustriens Landsforening.

In politics, he was a central committee member of the Norwegian Young Conservatives and secretary for the Conservative Party in Finnmark. From 1981 to 1983 he was a State Secretary in the Ministry of Transport and Communications, as a part of Willoch's First Cabinet.

He resides in Tromsø. He contributed to the failed 2018 Winter Olympic bid for Tromsø.
