= Litlesotra =

Island in Vestland, Norway

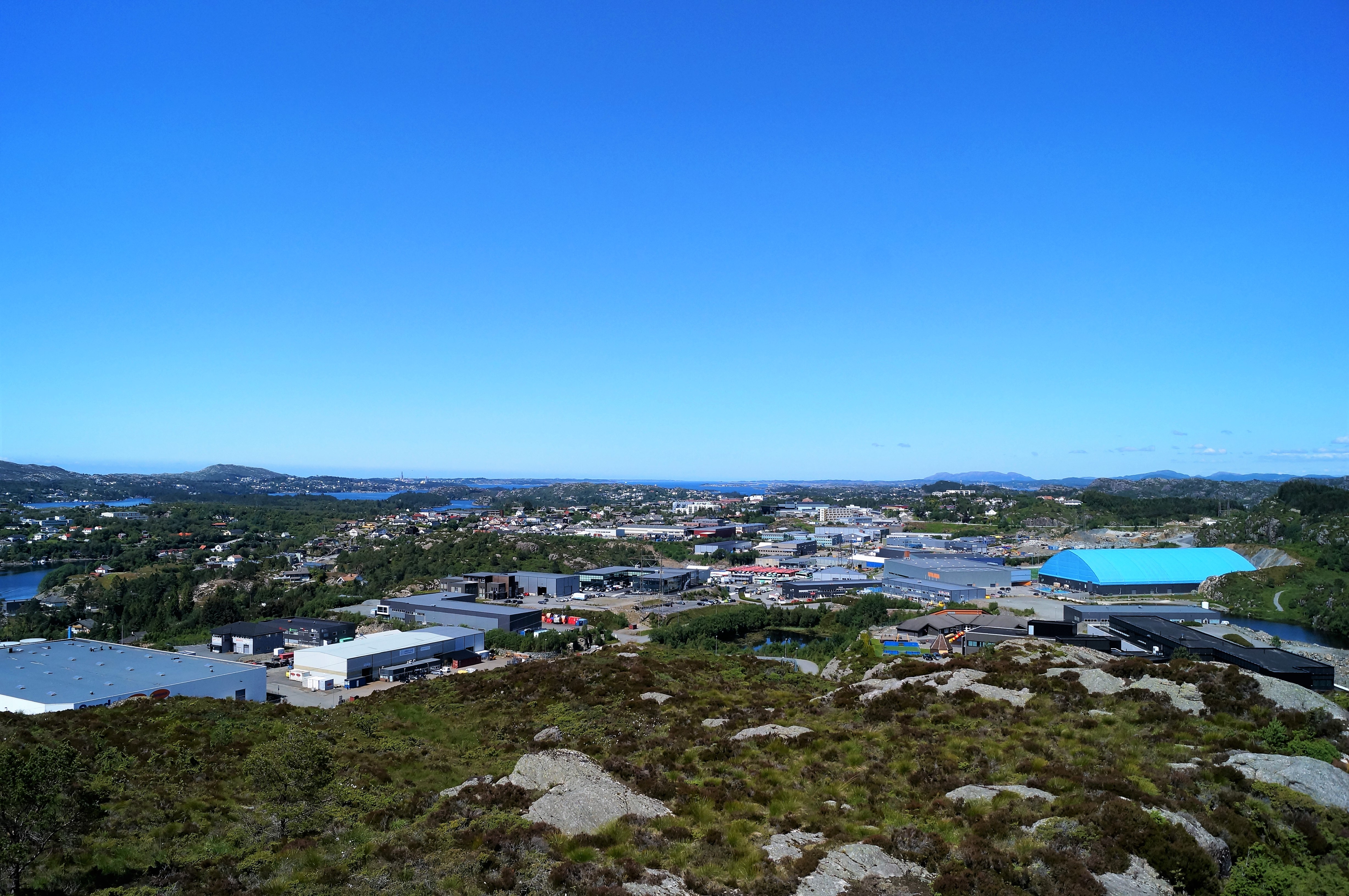
- View of Straume
- Interactive map of Litlesotra

Geography
- Location: Vestland, Norway
- Coordinates: 60.3586°N 5.1368°E
- Area: 16.7 km^{2} (6.4 sq mi)
- Highest elevation: 122 m (400 ft)
- Highest point: Grasmenipa

Administration
- Norway
- County: Vestland
- Municipality: Øygarden Municipality

Demographics
- Population: 9,500 (2017)

Litlesotra (sometimes Lille Sotra) is an island in Øygarden Municipality in Vestland county, Norway. It is part of the Sotra island group which makes up the southern part of a larger archipelago of islands from Fedje south through the Øygarden archipelago. The 16.7-square-kilometre (6.4 sq mi) island has about 9,500 residents. The main settlement on the island is Straume. Other settlements include Knarrevik, Foldnes, and Brattholmen. The island is connected to the mainland via the Sotra Bridge. It is also connected to the large island of Sotra, via a series of bridges over the island of Bildøyna.

The island lies where the Hjeltefjorden meets the Byfjorden. The island of Bjorøyna lies to the south, the island of Askøy to the northeast, the island of Geitanger to the northwest, and Bildøyna and Sotra islands to the west. The Bergen Peninsula on the mainland lies to the east.

== See also ==
- List of islands of Norway
