= Drotningsvik =

Neighbourhood in Bergen, Norway

Coordinates: 60°22′15″N 5°10′26″E

Drotningsvik is a neighbourhood in the city of Bergen, Norway. It is located west of the village of Loddefjord in the borough of Laksevåg in Bergen Municipality. It also borders the neighbouring Øygarden Municipality, and is connected by a brige to the neighboring municipality.
