= Laksevåg Municipality =

Former municipality in Hordaland, Norway

Laksevåg Municipality Laksevåg kommune
- Former municipality
- Laksevaag herred (historic name)
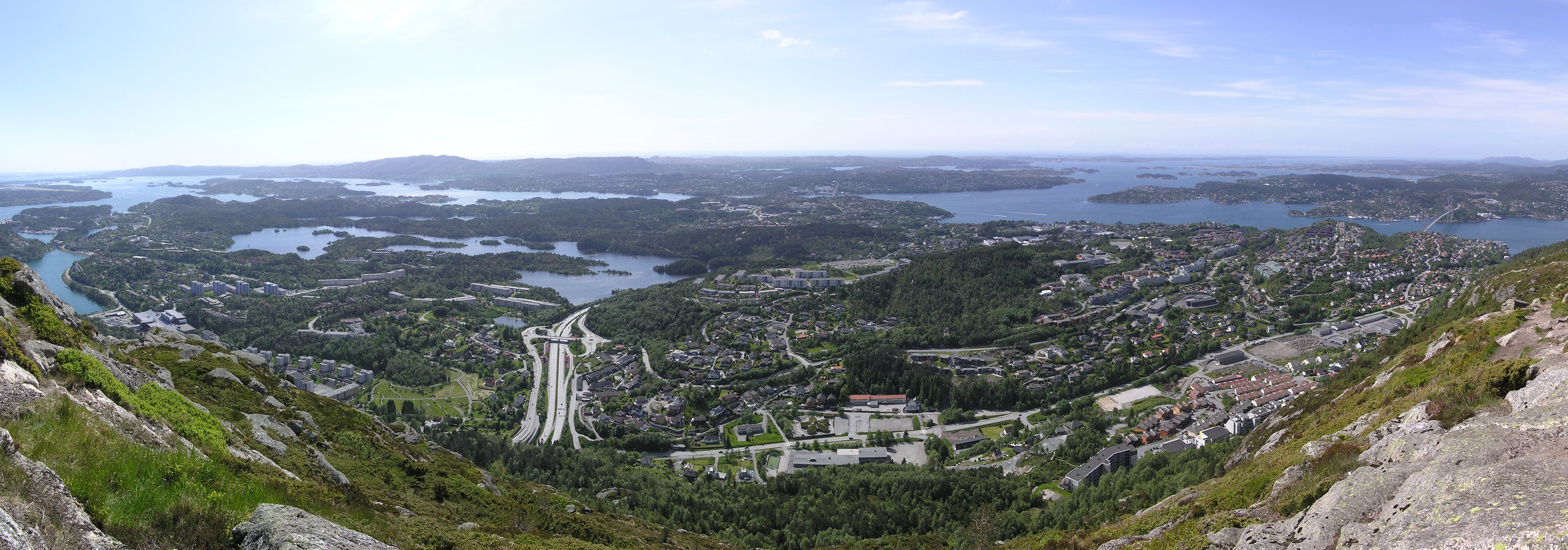
- View from Lyderhorn

- Hordaland within Norway

- Laksevåg within Hordaland
- Coordinates: 60°22′07″N 05°13′33″E
- Country: Norway
- County: Hordaland
- District: Midhordland
- Established: 1 July 1918
  - Preceded by: Askøy Municipality
- Disestablished: 1 Jan 1972
  - Succeeded by: Bergen Municipality
- Administrative centre: Loddefjord

Government
  - Mayor (1964–1971): Ingvald Iversen

Area (upon dissolution)
  - Total: 31.8 km^{2} (12.3 sq mi)
  - Rank: #427 in Norway
- Highest elevation: 396 m (1,299 ft)

Population (1971)
  - Total: 23,350
  - Rank: #27 in Norway
  - Density: 734.3/km^{2} (1,902/sq mi)
  - Change (10 years): ▲ +28.7%

Official language
  - Norwegian form: Bokmål
- Time zone: UTC+01:00 (CET)
  - Summer (DST): UTC+02:00 (CEST)
- ISO 3166 code: NO-1248

Laksevåg is a former municipality in the old Hordaland county, Norway. The 31.8-square-kilometre (12.3 sq mi) municipality existed from 1918 until its dissolution in 1972. The area is now part of Bergen Municipality in the traditional district of Midhordland in Vestland county. The administrative centre was the village of Loddefjord. The municipality was a located a short distance west of the city of Bergen, and today it makes up the borough of Laksevåg.

Prior to its dissolution in 1972, the 31.8-square-kilometre (12.3 sq mi) municipality was the 427th largest by area out of the 449 municipalities in Norway. Laksevåg Municipality was the 27th most populous municipality in Norway with a population of about 23,350. The municipality's population density was 734.3 inhabitants per square kilometre (1,902/sq mi) and its population had increased by 28.7% over the previous 10-year period.

== General information ==
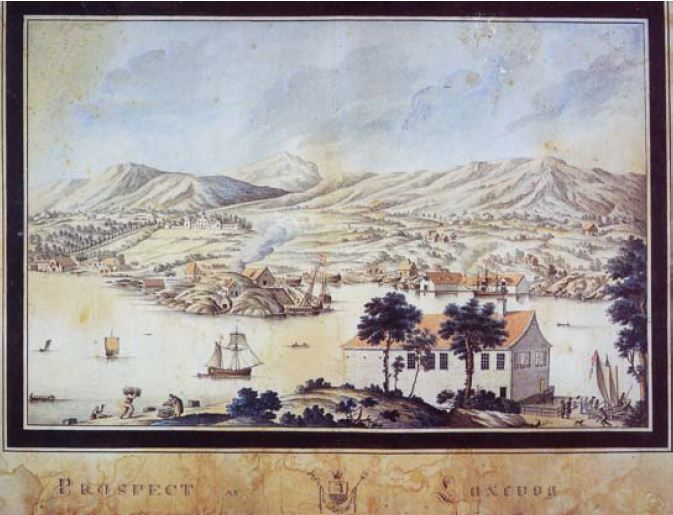
View of the Laksevåg area in 1809

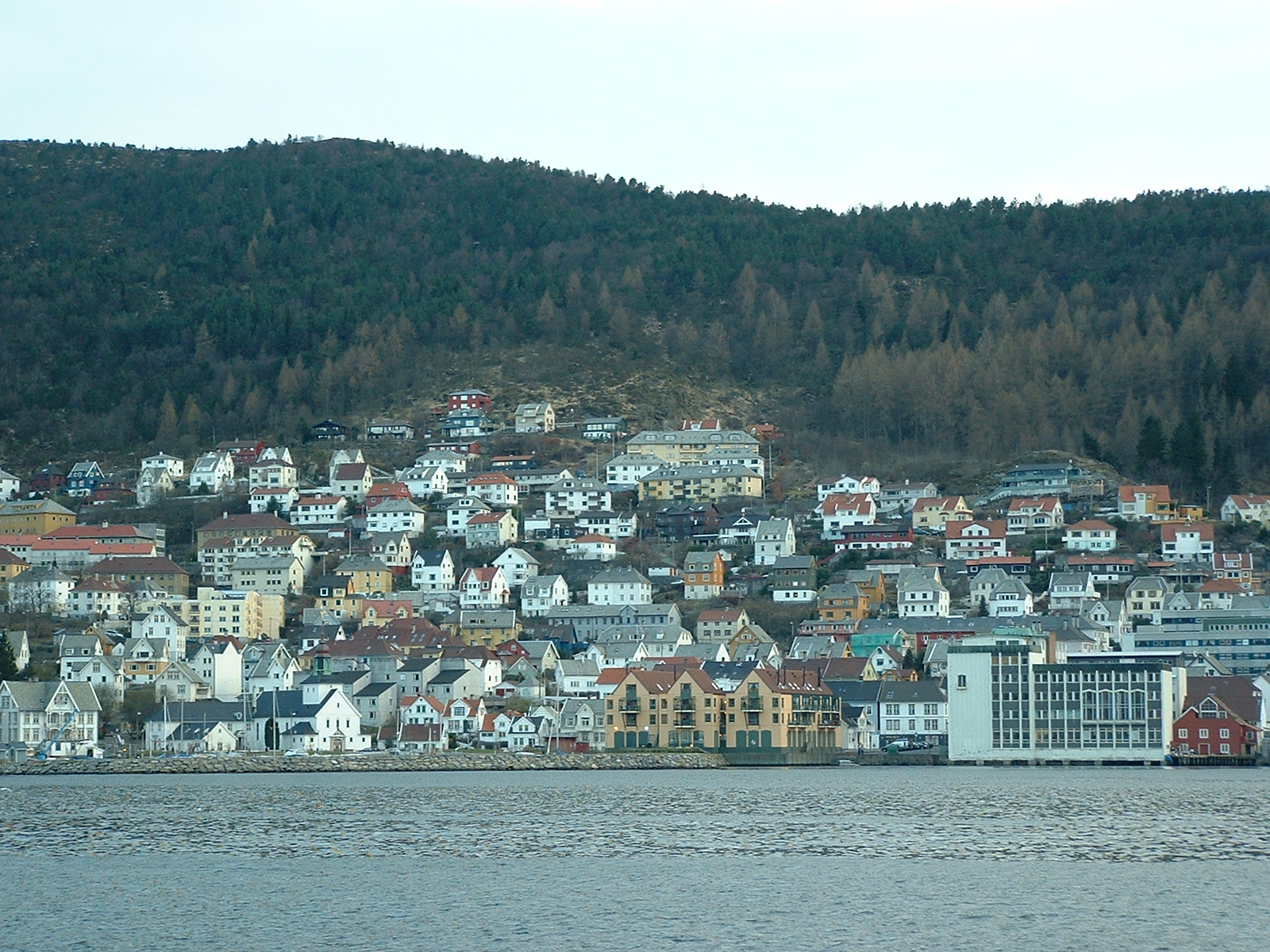
Laksevåg neighborhood

The municipality of Laksevåg was established on 1 July 1918 when the large Askøy Municipality was divided: the northern island portion of the municipality (population: 4,822) remained as a smaller Askøy Municipality and the southern mainland areas (population: 6,957) became the new Laksevåg Municipality.

On 1 July 1921, the village area of Gyldenpris (population: 1,734) was transferred from Laksevåg Municipality to the growing city of Bergen, located to the east.

On 1 January 1972, the city of Bergen was greatly expanded and the following areas were merged to for a new, much larger Bergen Municipality with over 200,000 residents:

- the city of Bergen (population: 111,925)
- all of Fana Municipality (population: 44,402)
- all of Laksevåg Municipality (population: 24,672)
- all of Åsane Municipality (population: 19,205)
- all of Arna Municipality (population: 11,766)

=== Name ===
The municipality (originally the parish) is named after the old Laksevåg farm (Old Norse: Laxavágr) since the first Laksevåg Church was built there. The first element is the plural genitive case of the word lax which means "salmon". The last element is vágr which means "inlet" or "bay". Thus, the name means "salmon bay".

On 21 December 1917, a royal resolution enacted the 1917 Norwegian language reforms. Prior to this change, the name was spelled Laksevaag with the digraph "aa", and after this reform, the name was spelled Laksevåg, using the letter å instead.

=== Churches ===
The Church of Norway had two parishes (sokn) within Laksevåg Municipality. At the time of the municipal dissolution, it was part of the Laksevåg prestegjeld and the Bergen domprosti (arch-deanery) in the Diocese of Bjørgvin.

Churches in Laksevåg Municipality
Parish (sokn)	Church name	Location of the church	Year built
Laksevåg	Laksevåg Church	Laksevåg	1875
Loddefjord	Loddefjord Church	Loddefjord	1926

== Geography ==
The municipality was located on the western part of the Bergen Peninsula along the Byfjorden, north of the Grimstadfjorden, and west of the Fyllingsdalen valley. The highest point in the municipality was the 396-metre (1,299 ft) tall mountain Lyderhorn. Askøy Municipality was located to the north, Bergen Municipality was located to the east, Fana Municipality was located to the south, and Fjell Municipality was located to the west.

== Government ==
While it existed, Laksevåg Municipality was responsible for primary education (through 10th grade), outpatient health services, senior citizen services, welfare and other social services, zoning, economic development, and municipal roads and utilities. The municipality was governed by a municipal council of directly elected representatives. The mayor was indirectly elected by a vote of the municipal council. The municipality was under the jurisdiction of the Gulating Court of Appeal.

=== Municipal council ===
The municipal council (Kommunestyre) of Laksevåg Municipality was made up of 41 representatives that were elected to four-year terms. The tables below show the historical composition of the council by political party.

Laksevåg kommunestyre 1967–1971
Party name (in Norwegian)	Number of representatives
Labour Party (Arbeiderpartiet)	20
Conservative Party (Høyre)	7
Communist Party (Kommunistiske Parti)	1
Christian Democratic Party (Kristelig Folkeparti)	2
Socialist People's Party (Sosialistisk Folkeparti)	3
Liberal Party (Venstre)	8
Total number of members:	41
Note: On 1 January 1972, Laksevåg Municipality became part of Bergen Municipality.

Laksevåg kommunestyre 1963–1967
Party name (in Norwegian)	Number of representatives
Labour Party (Arbeiderpartiet)	22
Conservative Party (Høyre)	8
Communist Party (Kommunistiske Parti)	1
Christian Democratic Party (Kristelig Folkeparti)	2
Socialist People's Party (Sosialistisk Folkeparti)	1
Liberal Party (Venstre)	7
Total number of members:	41

Laksevåg herredsstyre 1959–1963
Party name (in Norwegian)	Number of representatives
Labour Party (Arbeiderpartiet)	19
Conservative Party (Høyre)	5
Communist Party (Kommunistiske Parti)	5
Christian Democratic Party (Kristelig Folkeparti)	4
Liberal Party (Venstre)	8
Total number of members:	41

Laksevåg herredsstyre 1955–1959
Party name (in Norwegian)	Number of representatives
Labour Party (Arbeiderpartiet)	19
Conservative Party (Høyre)	4
Communist Party (Kommunistiske Parti)	6
Christian Democratic Party (Kristelig Folkeparti)	4
Liberal Party (Venstre)	8
Total number of members:	41

Laksevåg herredsstyre 1951–1955
Party name (in Norwegian)	Number of representatives
Labour Party (Arbeiderpartiet)	15
Conservative Party (Høyre)	2
Communist Party (Kommunistiske Parti)	5
Christian Democratic Party (Kristelig Folkeparti)	3
Liberal Party (Venstre)	7
Total number of members:	32

Laksevåg herredsstyre 1947–1951
Party name (in Norwegian)	Number of representatives
Labour Party (Arbeiderpartiet)	12
Conservative Party (Høyre)	1
Communist Party (Kommunistiske Parti)	8
Christian Democratic Party (Kristelig Folkeparti)	2
Liberal Party (Venstre)	5
Joint List(s) of Non-Socialist Parties (Borgerlige Felleslister)	4
Total number of members:	32

Laksevåg herredsstyre 1945–1947
Party name (in Norwegian)	Number of representatives
Labour Party (Arbeiderpartiet)	13
Conservative Party (Høyre)	1
Liberal Party (Venstre)	3
List of workers, fishermen, and small farmholders (Arbeidere, fiskere, småbrukere liste)	4
Joint List(s) of Non-Socialist Parties (Borgerlige Felleslister)	3
Total number of members:	24

Laksevåg herredsstyre 1937–1941*
Party name (in Norwegian)	Number of representatives
Labour Party (Arbeiderpartiet)	8
Conservative Party (Høyre)	2
Communist Party (Kommunistiske Parti)	5
Liberal Party (Venstre)	4
Joint List(s) of Non-Socialist Parties (Borgerlige Felleslister)	4
Local List(s) (Lokale lister)	1
Total number of members:	24
Note: Due to the German occupation of Norway during World War II, no elections were held for new municipal councils until after the war ended in 1945.

=== Mayors ===
The mayor (Norwegian: ordfører) of Laksevåg Municipality was the political leader of the municipality and the chairperson of the municipal council. The following people have held this position:

- 1918–1920: A. Andersen
- 1920–1922: Ludvig Sæhoug
- 1923–1925: D.M. Davidsen
- 1926–1928: Bernhard Christensen
- 1929–1931: Hermann Havre
- 1932–1934: Bernhard Christensen
- 1935–1936: B. Groufh-Jacobsen
- 1936–1940: Alf Pettersen
- 1945–1945: Alf Pettersen
- 1946–1954: Andreas Nygaardsvik
- 1954–1964: Olav Hereid
- 1964–1971: Ingvald Iversen

== See also ==
- List of former municipalities of Norway
