= Kjøkkelvik IL =

Norwegian multi-sports club based in Bergen

- Full name: Kjøkkelvik Idrettslag
- Founded: 7 October 1934
- Ground: Kjøkkelvikbanen, Bergen, Norway
- League: 6. divisjon (seventh tier)
- 2024: Promoted
Home colours

Kjøkkelvik Idrettslag is a Norwegian multi-sports club based in the Kjøkkelvik and Olsvik areas of Laksevåg borough in Bergen. Founded on 7 October 1934, the club operates departments for association football, handball, and gymnastics.

== History and facilities ==
Established in 1934, the club historically served as a central sports organization for the western suburbs of Bergen. The football section utilizes Kjøkkelvikbanen for training and home matches. The handball department primarily uses Olsvikhallen, as well as Mathopenhallen through a cooperative arrangement. The gymnastics department operates out of local school facilities, Olsvikhallen, Sotra Turnhall, and the club's own clubhouse, Fæsterhuset.

== Sports ==
=== Football ===
Football has been part of the club's activity since its early years, with official competitive matches recorded from 1939.

The men's senior team experienced its most successful modern period during the late 1990s and early 2000s, competing in the 3. divisjon (the fourth tier of Norwegian football) until relegation following the 2001 season. After several seasons in lower regional divisions, the team secured promotion back to the 6. divisjon in 2024.

=== Handball ===
The handball department was established in 1973 and developed into one of the club's primary competitive branches, fielding teams at national levels in both men's and women's categories.

==== Men's team ====
The men's senior team reached the 1. divisjon (the second tier of Norwegian handball) in the late 1990s and maintained a continuous presence in the division from 2001 to 2005. During the 2003–04 season, Kjøkkelvik qualified for the mid-season promotion stage known as the Gildeserien. During this era, the club functioned as a regional developmental partner for Fyllingen Håndball, Bergen's top-flight elite team.

After dropping to lower divisions post-2005, the team returned to the 2. divisjon between 2013 and 2018. Since the 2017–18 season, the senior team has periodically entered joint cooperative sides under the name Kjøkkelvik/Mathopen in collaboration with neighboring club Mathopen IL.

==== Women's team ====
The women's senior team spent twelve consecutive seasons in the 2. divisjon from 2004–05 through 2015–16. The team regularly participated in the national Norwegian Handball Cup during this period, and has primarily competed in the 3. divisjon in subsequent years.

==== Notable players ====
- Jarle Rykkje – Former Norwegian national handball team player (79 caps) who played youth football and handball for Kjøkkelvik before joining Fyllingen Håndball.

=== Gymnastics ===
The gymnastics department was established in 1950 and offers recreational and youth gymnastics activities across multiple facilities in the Laksevåg borough.
