= Loddefjord =

Neighborhood in Bergen, Norway

- Neighborhood in Bergen
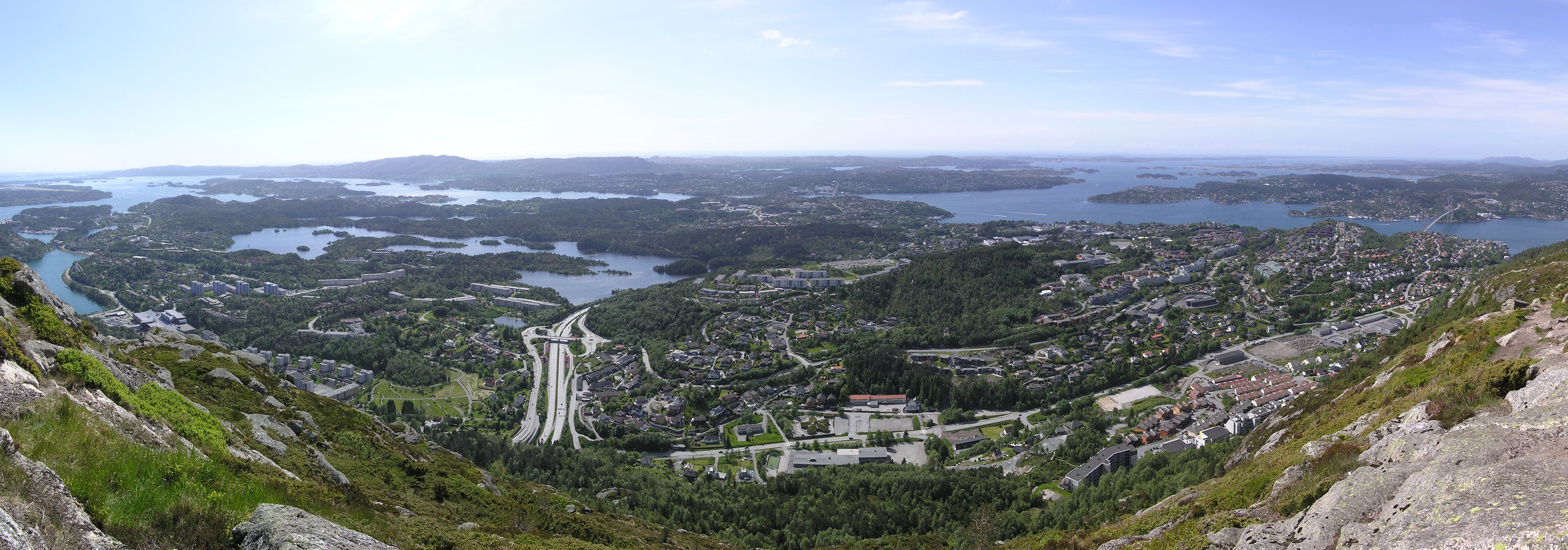
- View from Lyderhorn towards west
- Nickname: Loddikken
- Interactive map of Loddefjord
- Coordinates: 60.36879°N 5.22607°E
- Country: Norway
- Region: Western Norway
- County: Vestland
- Municipality: Bergen
- Borough: Laksevåg
- Elevation: 54 m (177 ft)
- Time zone: UTC+01:00 (CET)
  - Summer (DST): UTC+02:00 (CEST)

Loddefjord is an urban settlement in the borough of Laksevåg in Bergen Municipality in Vestland county, Norway. It is located about 6 kilometres (3.7 mi) southwest of the centre of the city of Bergen. Loddefjord consists mainly of high- and low-rise flats revolving around the local shopping mall.

Informally, the area is sometimes referred to as "Loddikken".

== Gallery ==
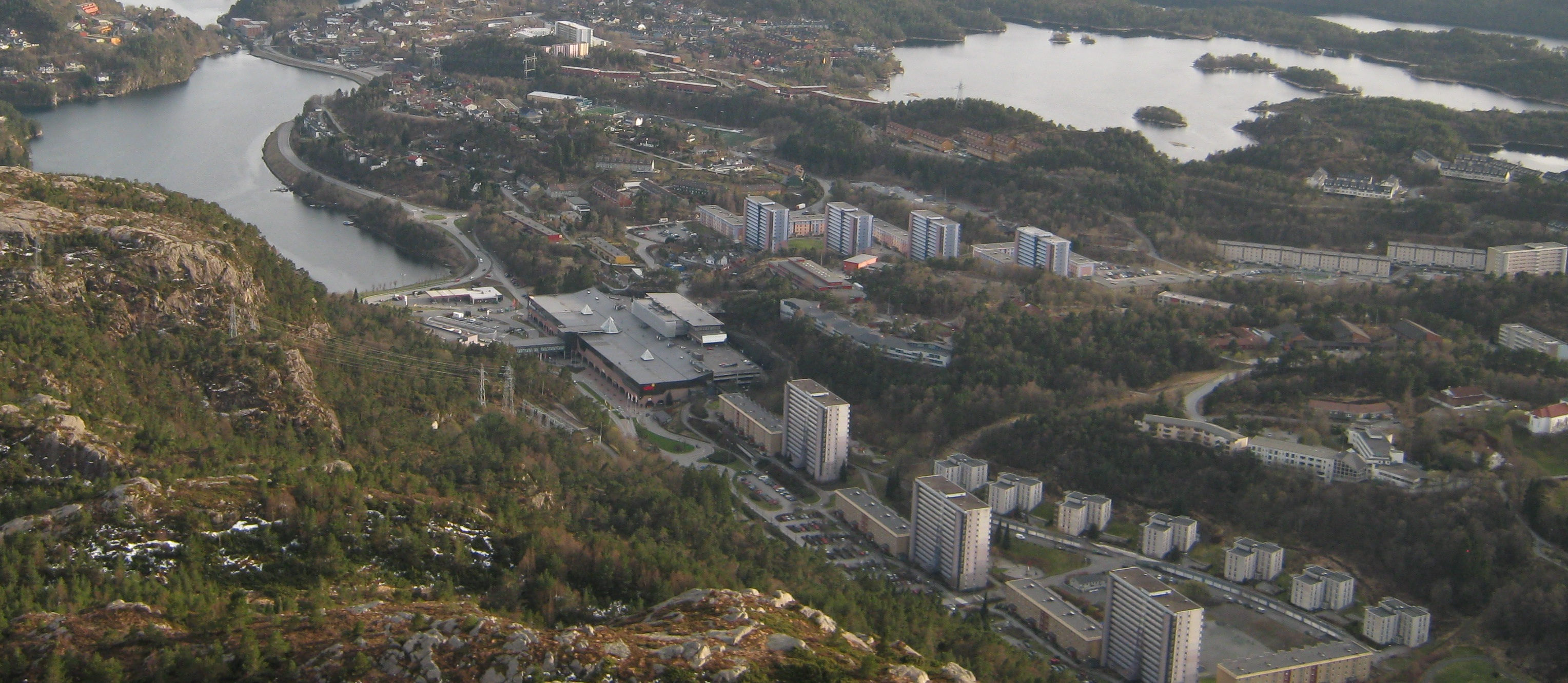
Central parts of Loddefjord

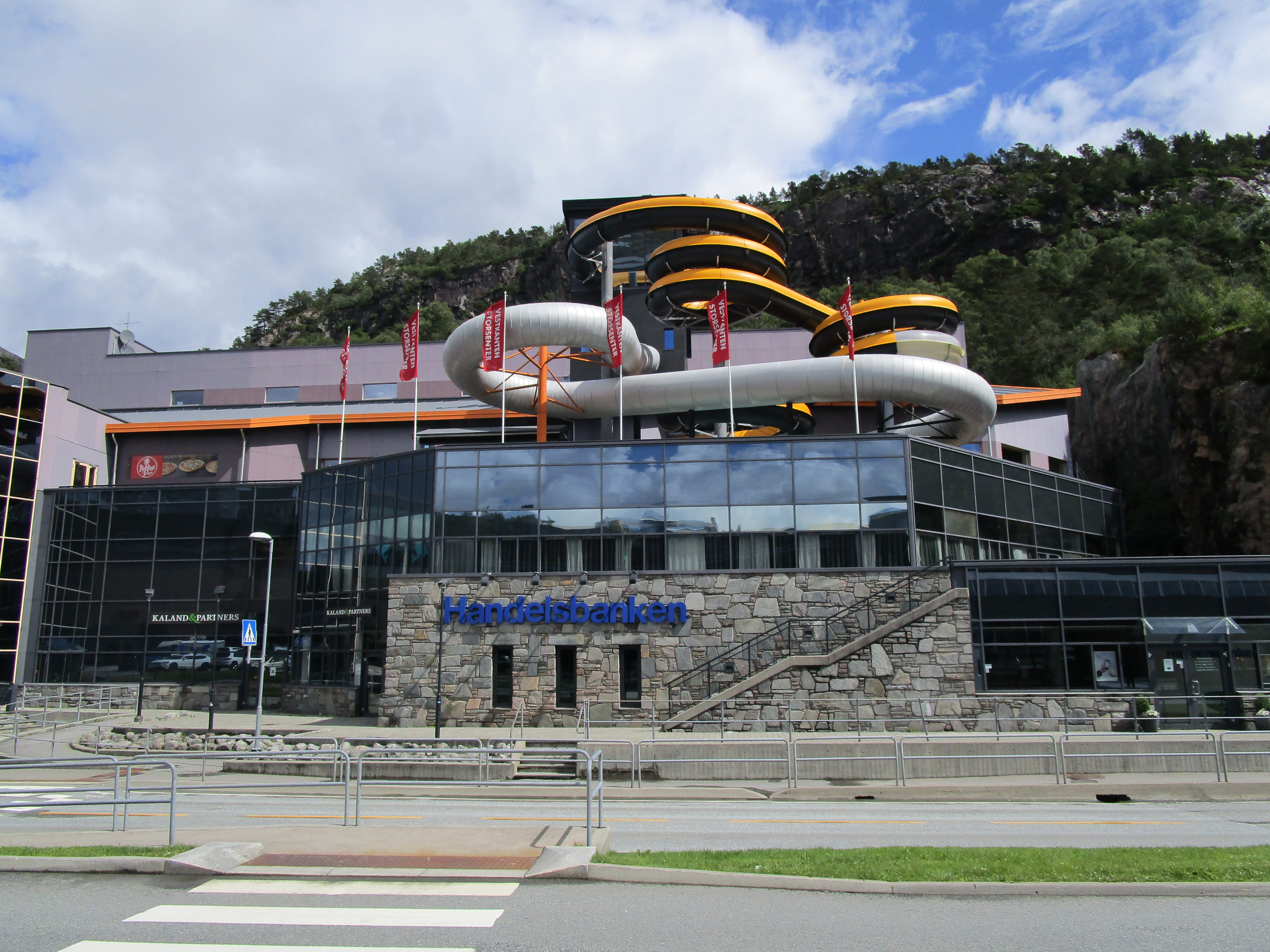
Vannkanten badeland, aqua park

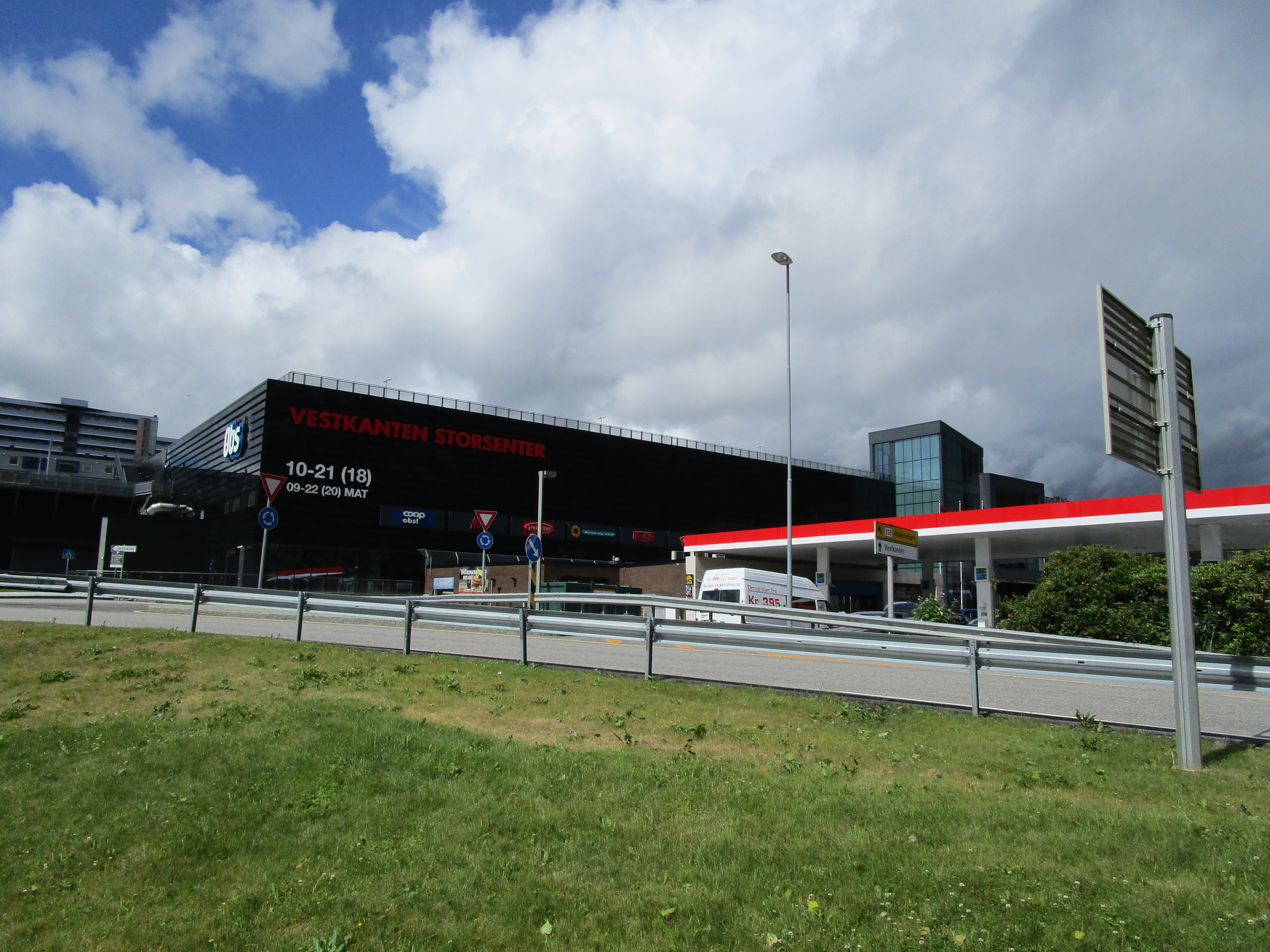
Vestkanten Storsenter, a shopping mall

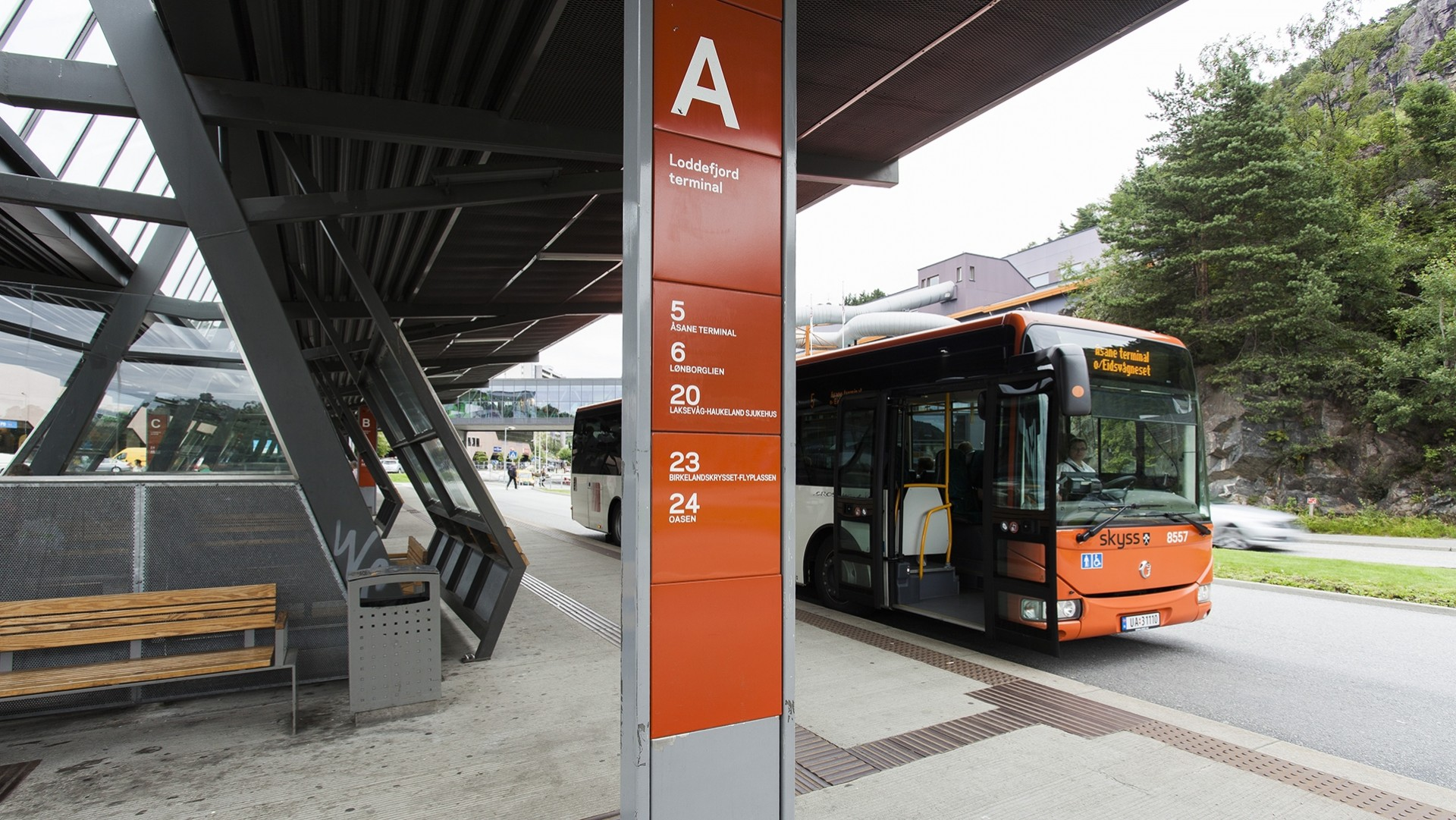
Loddefjord bus station

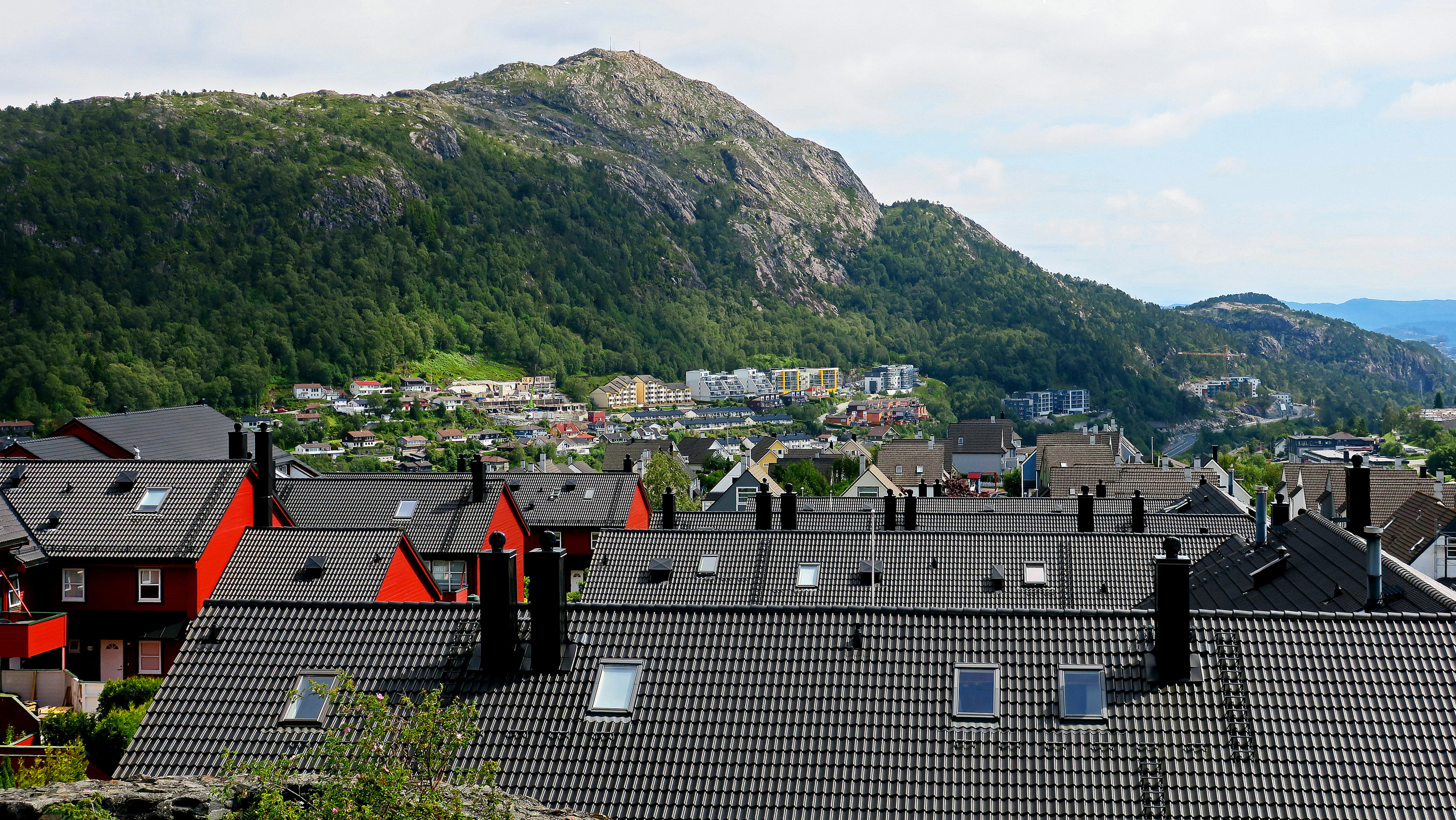
View from Olsvik towards Lyderhorn
