= Laksevåg =

Borough of Bergen, Norway

Laksevåg bydel
- Borough
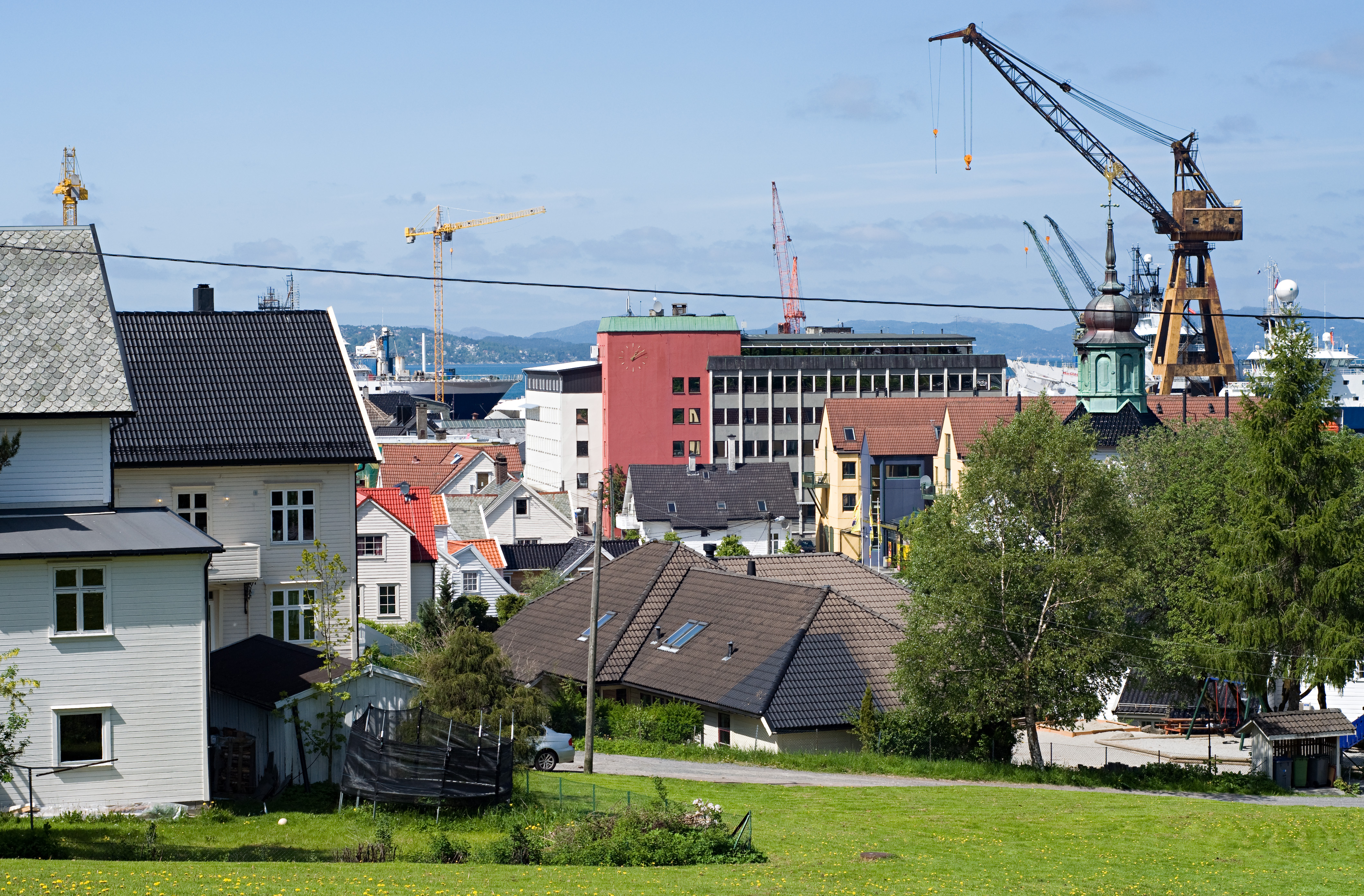

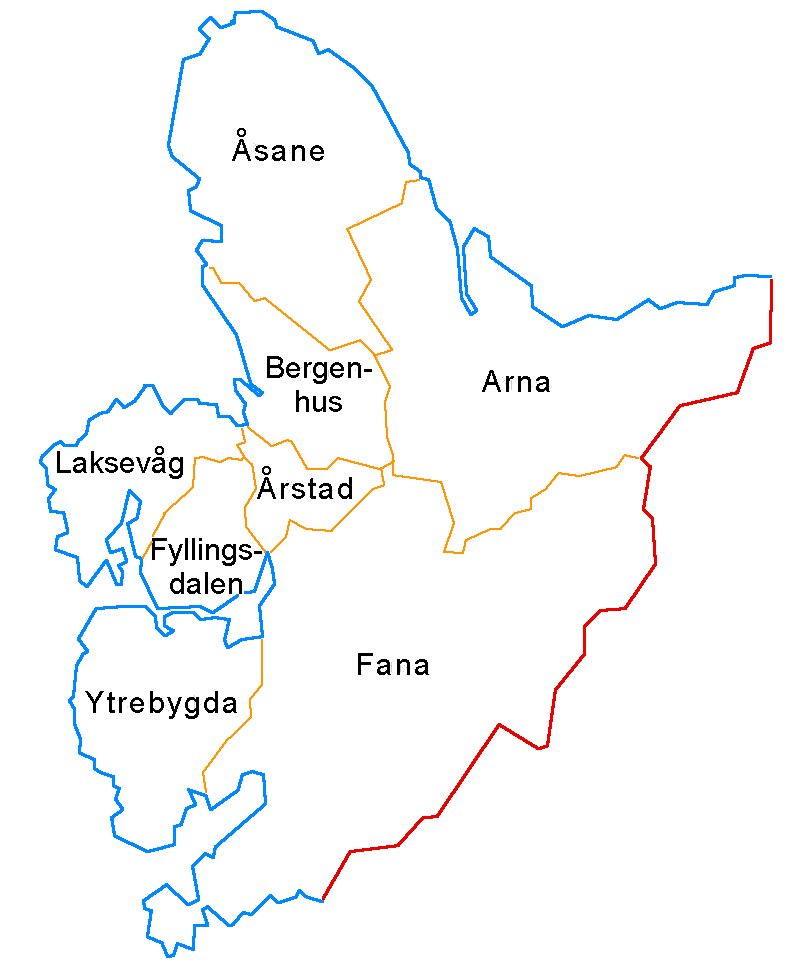
- Map of the 8 boroughs of Bergen
- Coordinates: 60°22′23″N 05°14′24″E
- Country: Norway
- Region: Western Norway
- County: Vestland
- District: Midhordland
- City: Bergen

Area
  - Total: 29.96 km^{2} (11.57 sq mi)
  - Rank: 5th
- 6.7% of total

Population (2014)
  - Total: 39,584
  - Rank: 5th
  - Density: 1,321/km^{2} (3,422/sq mi)
- 14.6% of total
- Time zone: UTC+01:00 (CET)
  - Summer (DST): UTC+02:00 (CEST)
- ISO 3166 code: NO-120105

Laksevåg is a borough of the city of Bergen in Vestland county, Norway. The borough is located in the western part of the municipality. Historically, the area was called Laxevaag, and it was a separate municipality until 1972 when it was merged into Bergen.

The borough of Laksevåg has residential areas on the hillside of the mountain Damsgårdsfjellet facing the Puddefjorden. By the fjord itself are several industrial buildings, many of them connected with the maritime industry. The rococo-style Damsgård Manor is located in the borough.

Like the neighboring borough of Fyllingsdalen, many of the neighborhoods of Laksevåg consist of apartment buildings, especially in the area around the main service centre, the Vestkanten shopping centre. The main road to Sotra passes through the Loddefjord area in western Laksevåg.

== History ==
The old Laksevåg Municipality was established on 1 July 1918 when it was separated from the large Askøy Municipality. On 1 January 1972, the municipalities surrounding the city of Bergen were merged with the city to form a large new Bergen Municipality. The municipalities involved in the merger were Arna Municipality, Fana Municipality, Laksevåg Municipality, and Åsane Municipality.

Since the merger, the area is now a borough within Bergen, with very similar borders to those of the old Laksevåg Municipality. After it was merged with Bergen, the former municipality was split into two boroughs: Laksevåg (which consisted of neighborhoods south of Puddefjorden separating it from the city centre) and Loddefjord (consisting of neighborhoods further west, closer to the islands of Sotra). In 2000, the boroughs were merged back together, once again forming the borough of Laksevåg.

== Geography ==
The mountain Gravdalsfjellet peaks at 351 metres (1,152 ft) in elevation.

=== Villages and neighborhoods ===
The borough of Laksevåg includes the villages and neighborhoods: Alvøen, Bjørndal, Drotningsvik, Godvik, Gravdal, Hetlevik, Håkonshella, Kjøkkelvik, Loddefjord, Loddefjorddalen, Mathopen, Olsvik, and Vadmyra.

== Local attractions ==
- Alvøen Mansion (Alvøen Hovedbygning) – Historic building constructed in the 1790s, reconstruction in 1830. opened as a museum in 1983
- Damsgård Manor – Historic manor house and estate
- Gravdal Manor (Gravdal hovedgård) – Historic Gravdal manor house, later military command headquarters
- Kvarven Fort – Coastal defense built to protect the local port and naval installations
- Lyderhorn – One of the seven mountains surrounding Bergen
- Damsgård Mountain (Damsgårdsfjellet) – One of the seven mountains surrounding Bergen

== Gallery ==
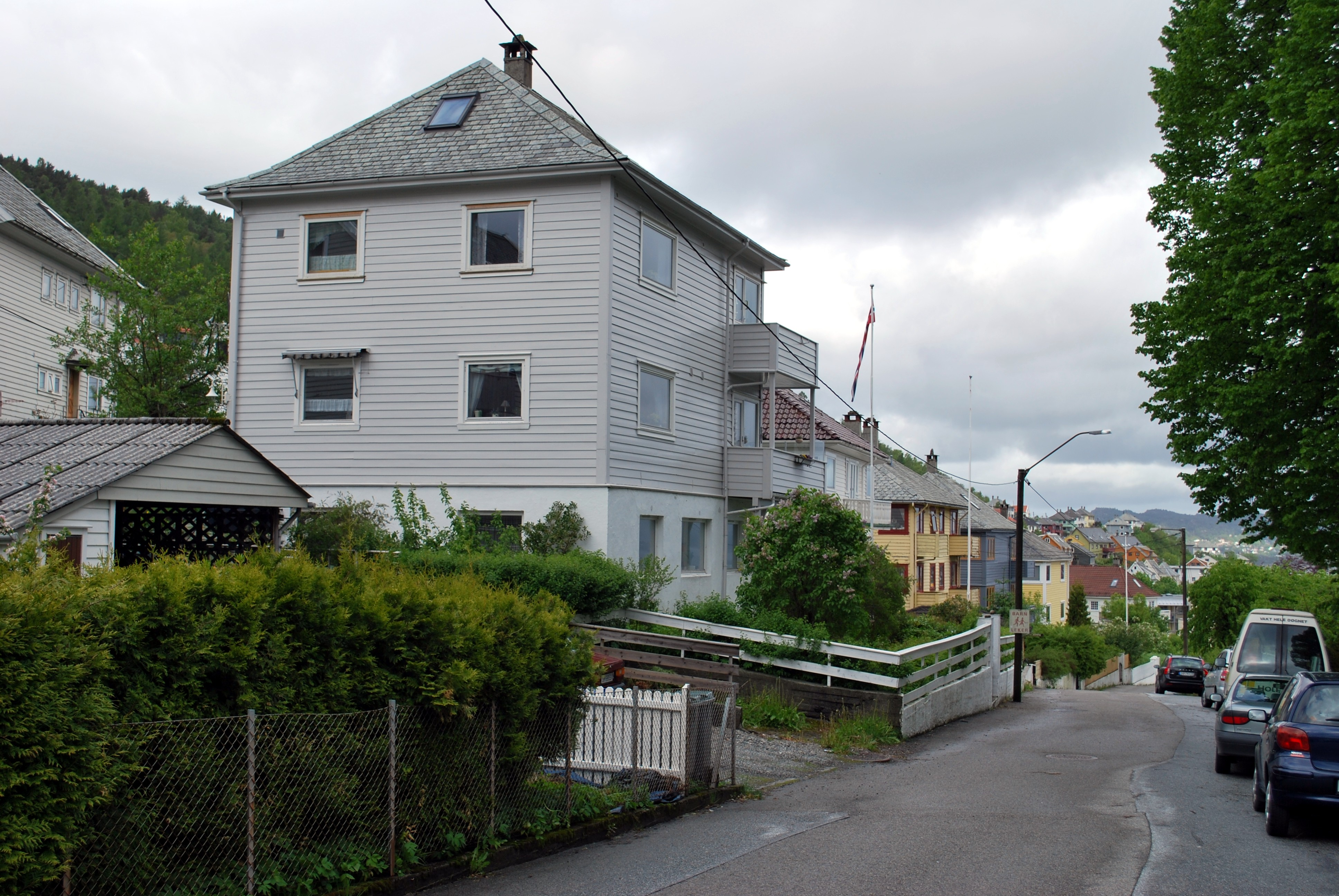
Damsgård

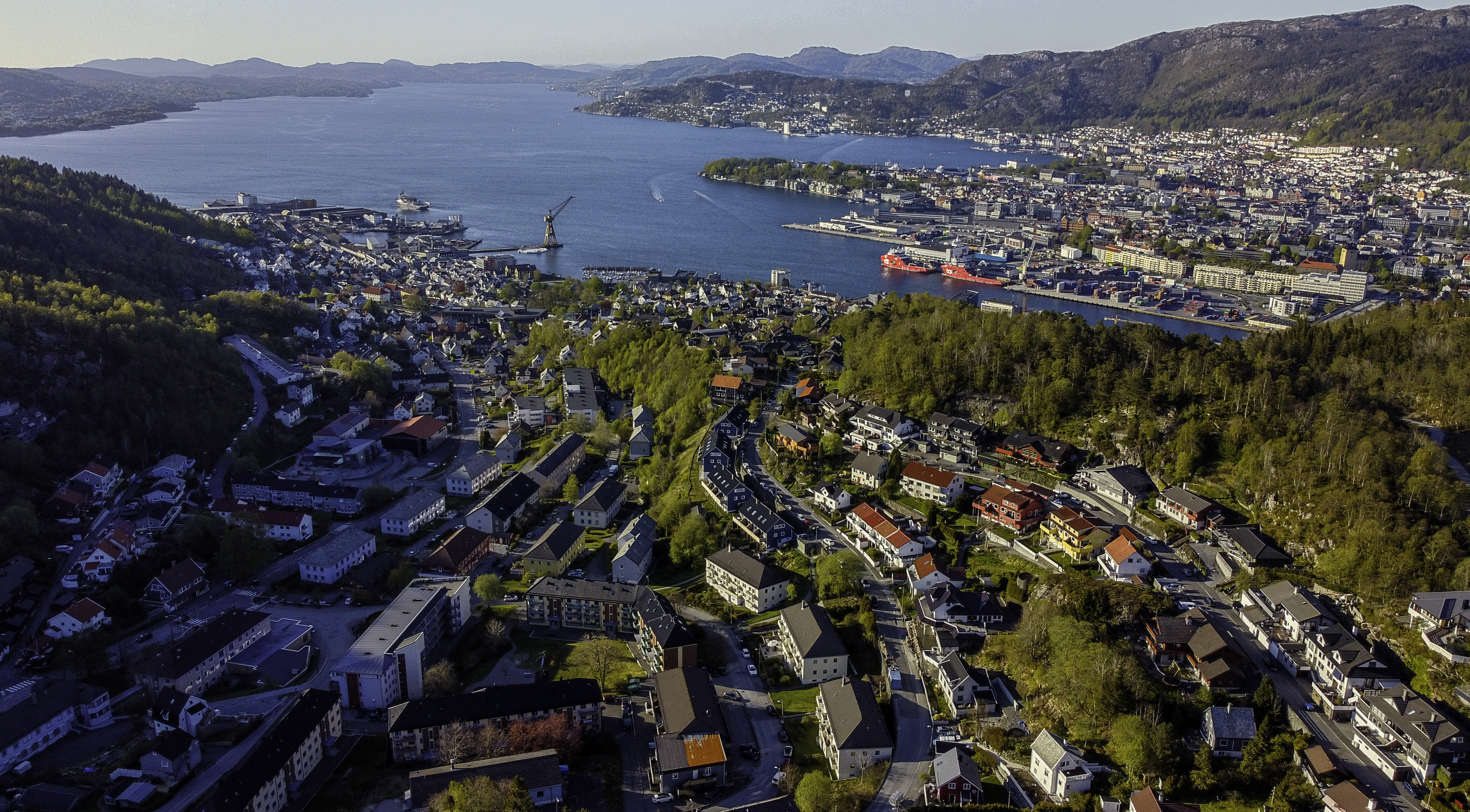
Melkeplassen

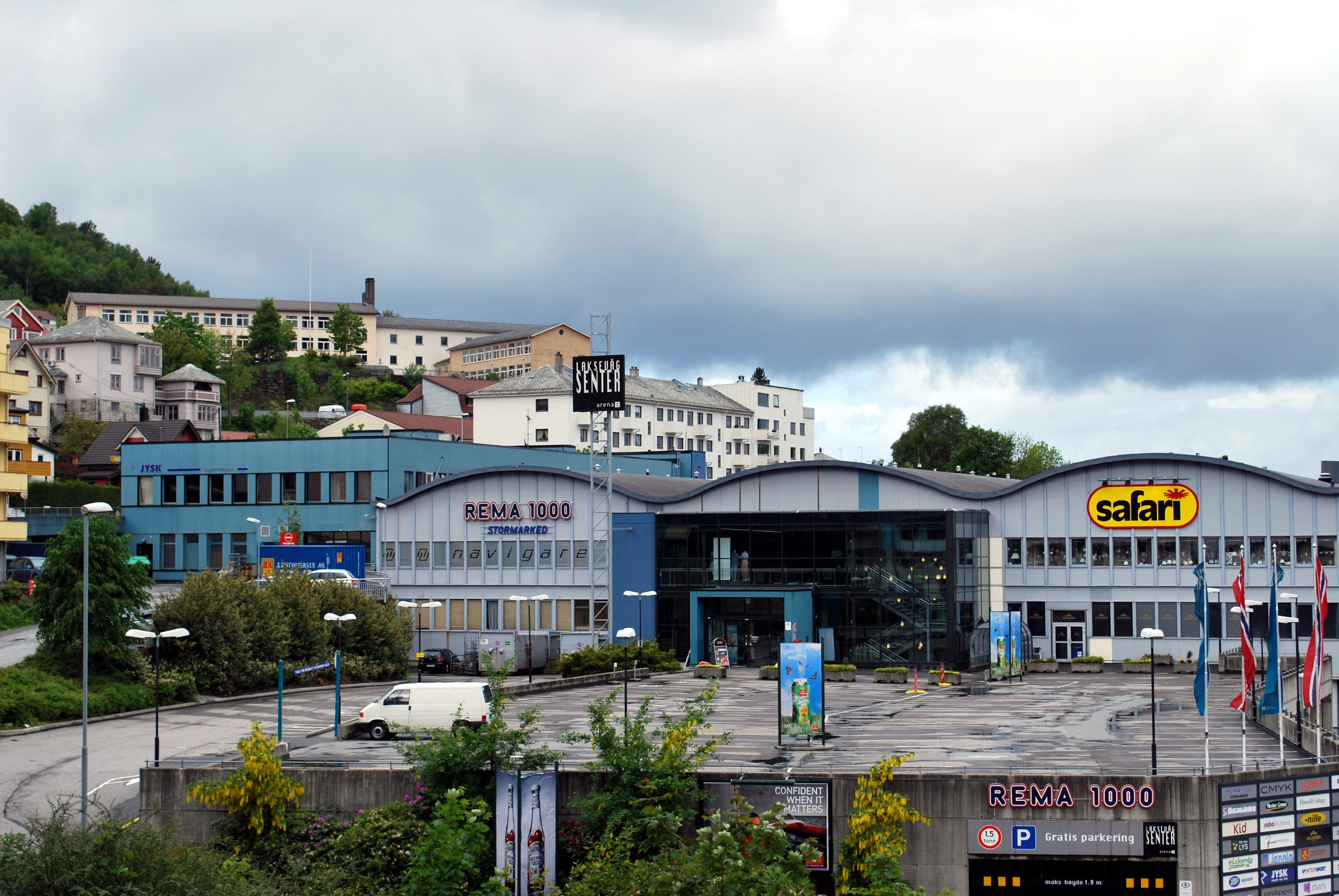
Laksevåg senter, a shopping mall

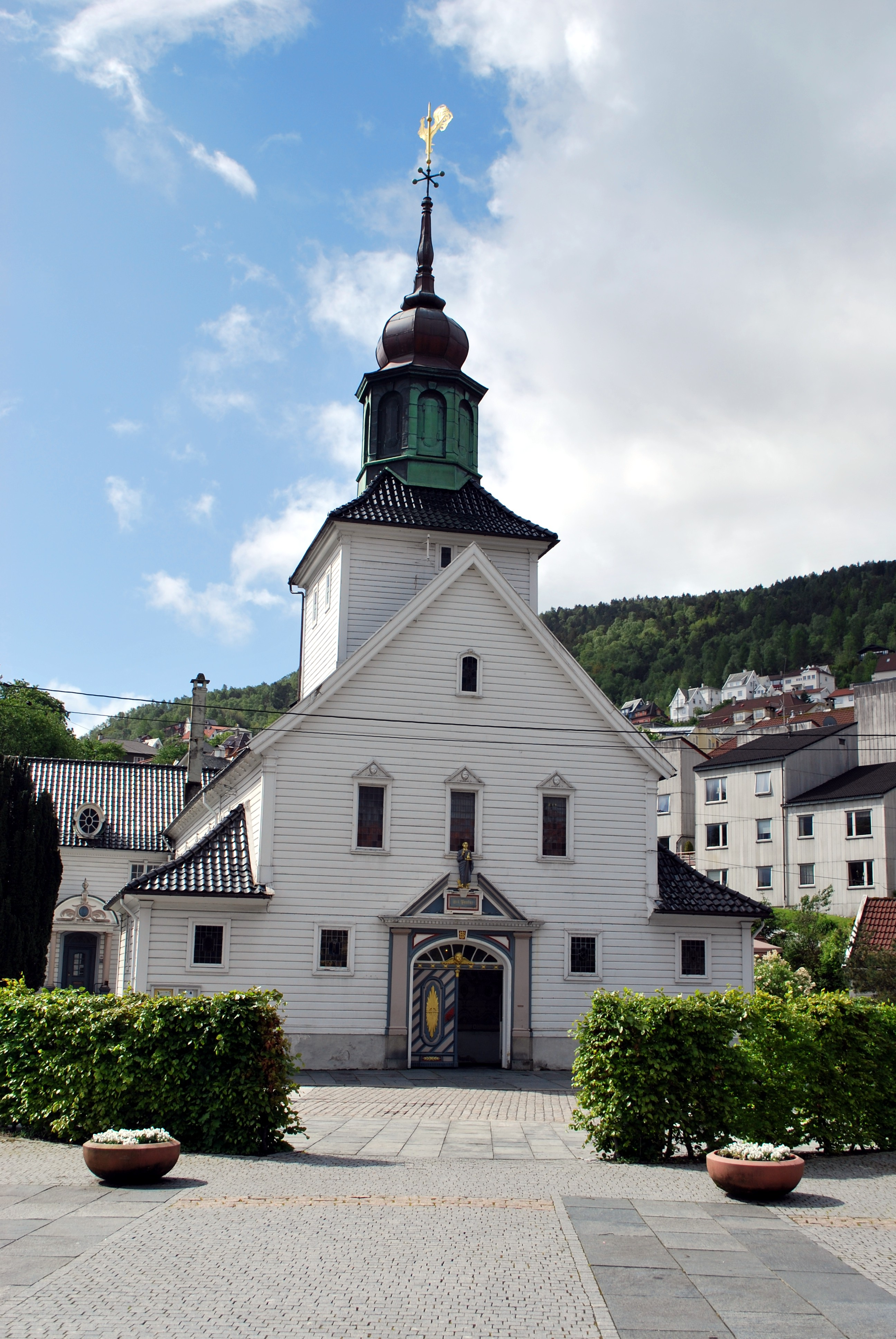
Laksevåg Church

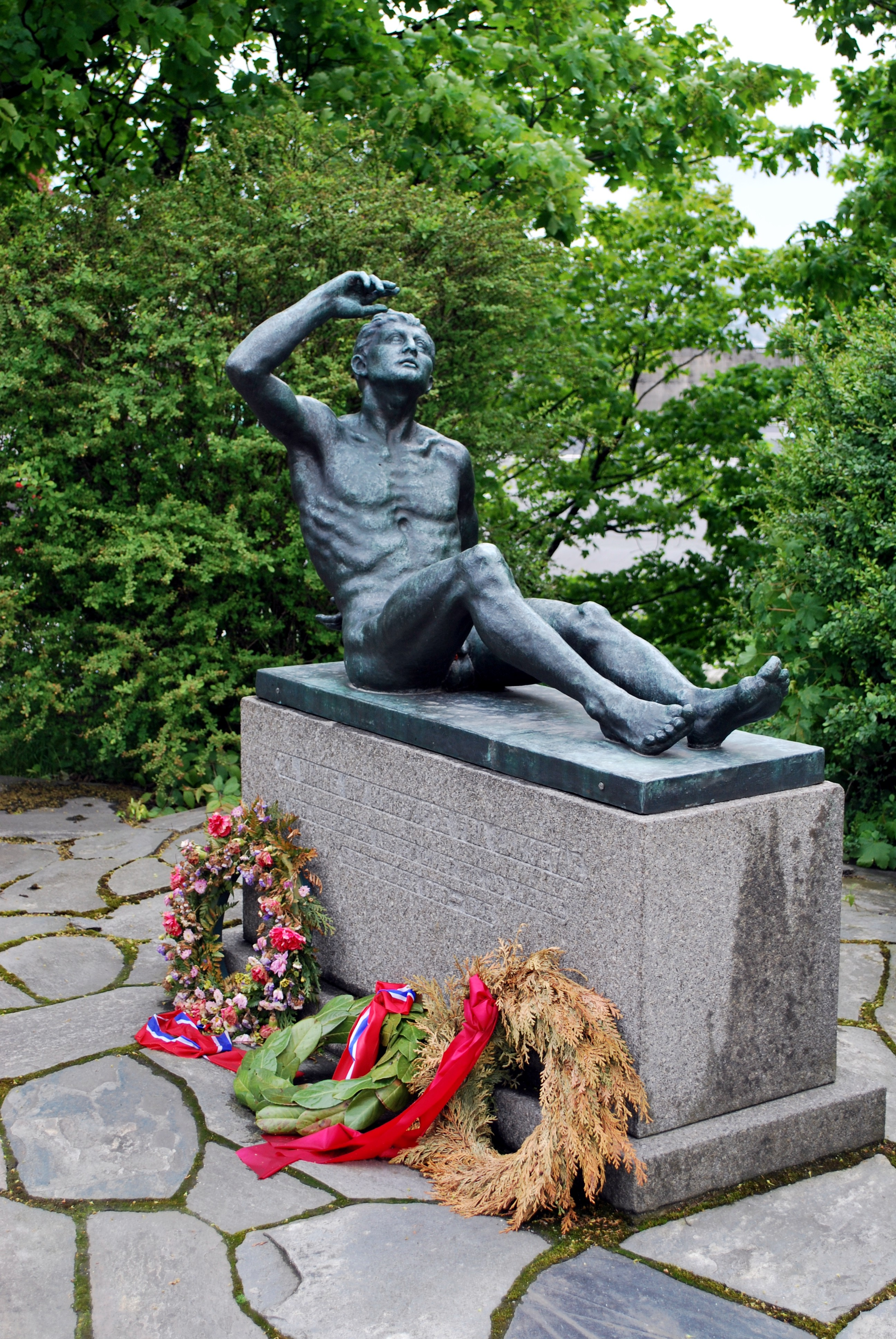
War memorial at Laksevåg in Bergen

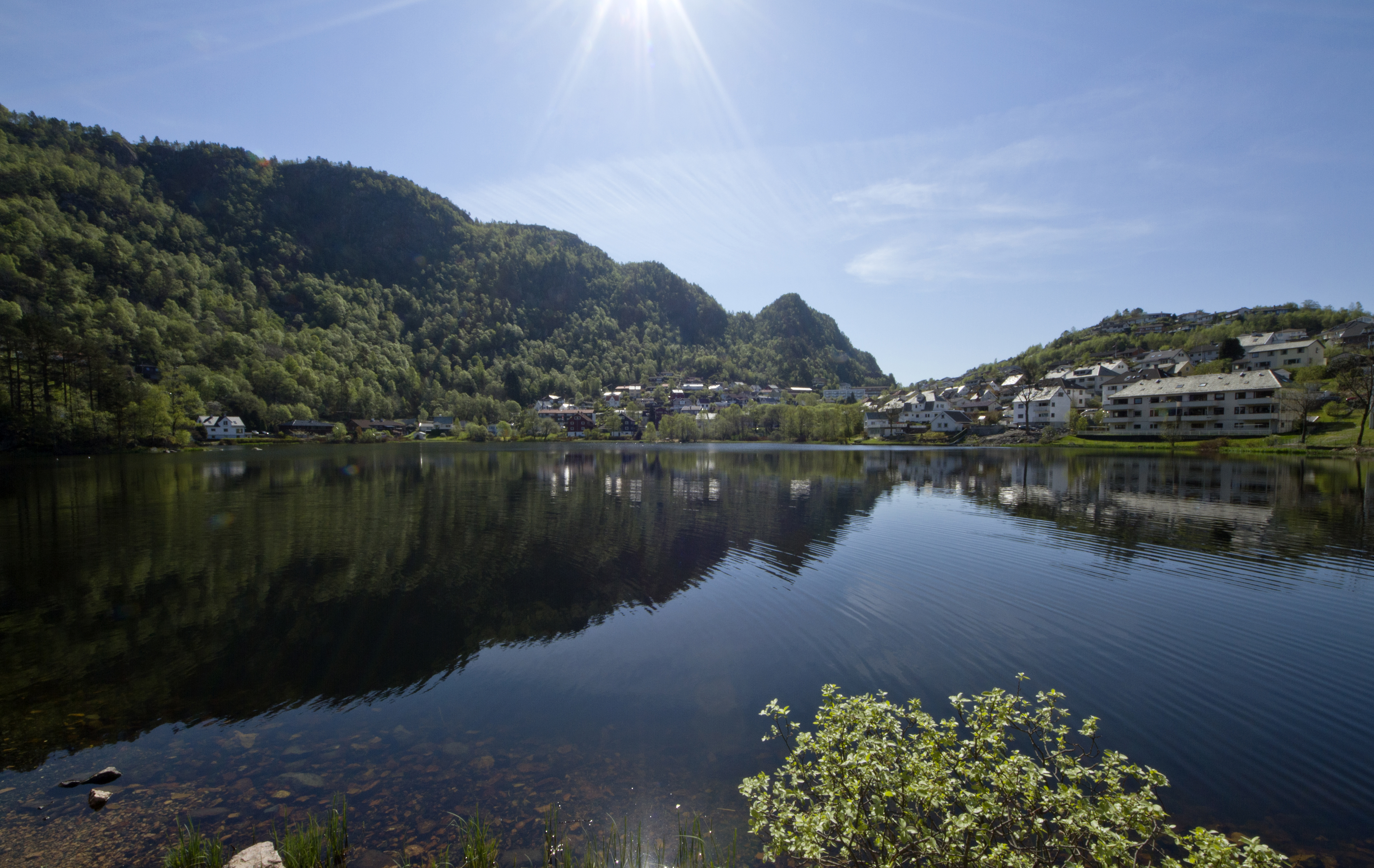
Lyngbøvatnet

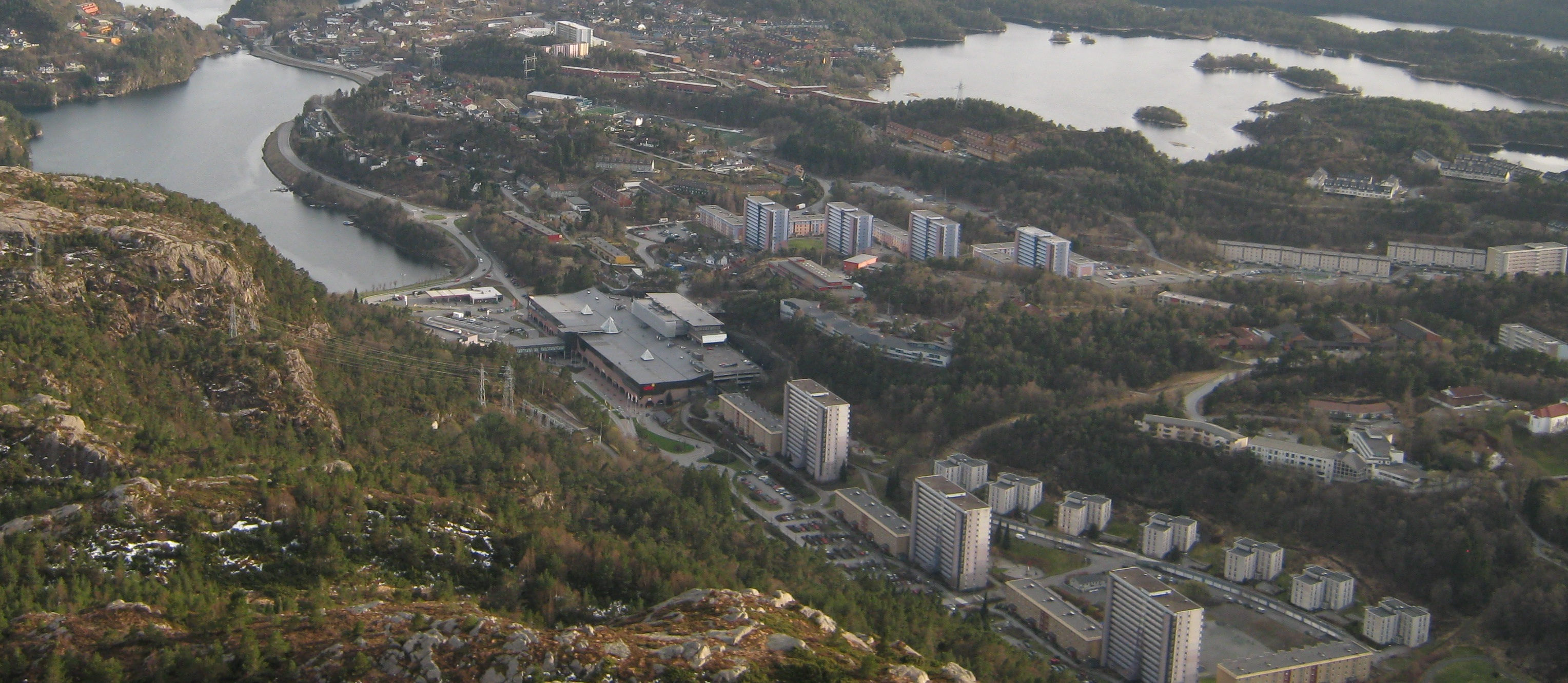
Central parts of Loddefjord

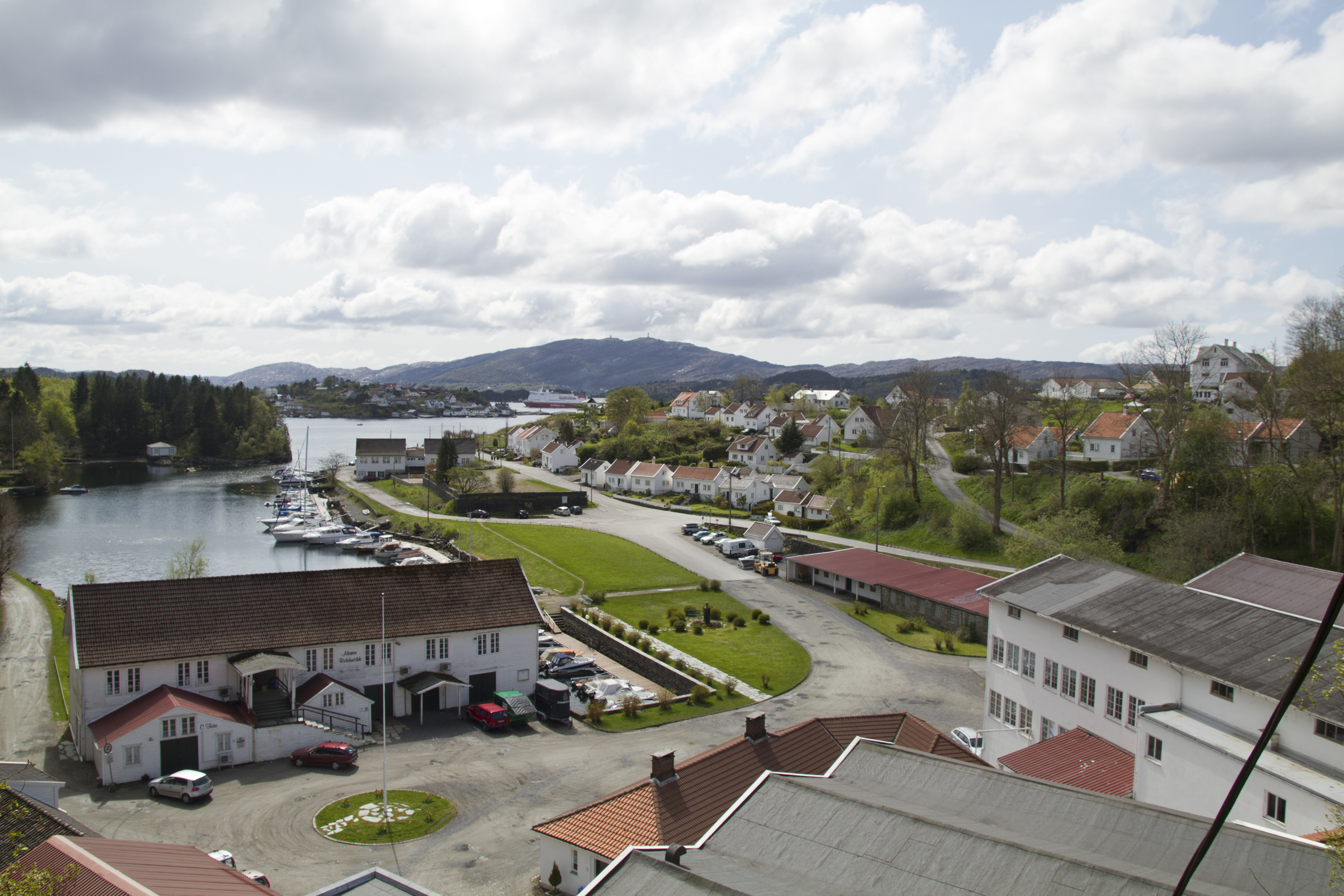
Alvøen

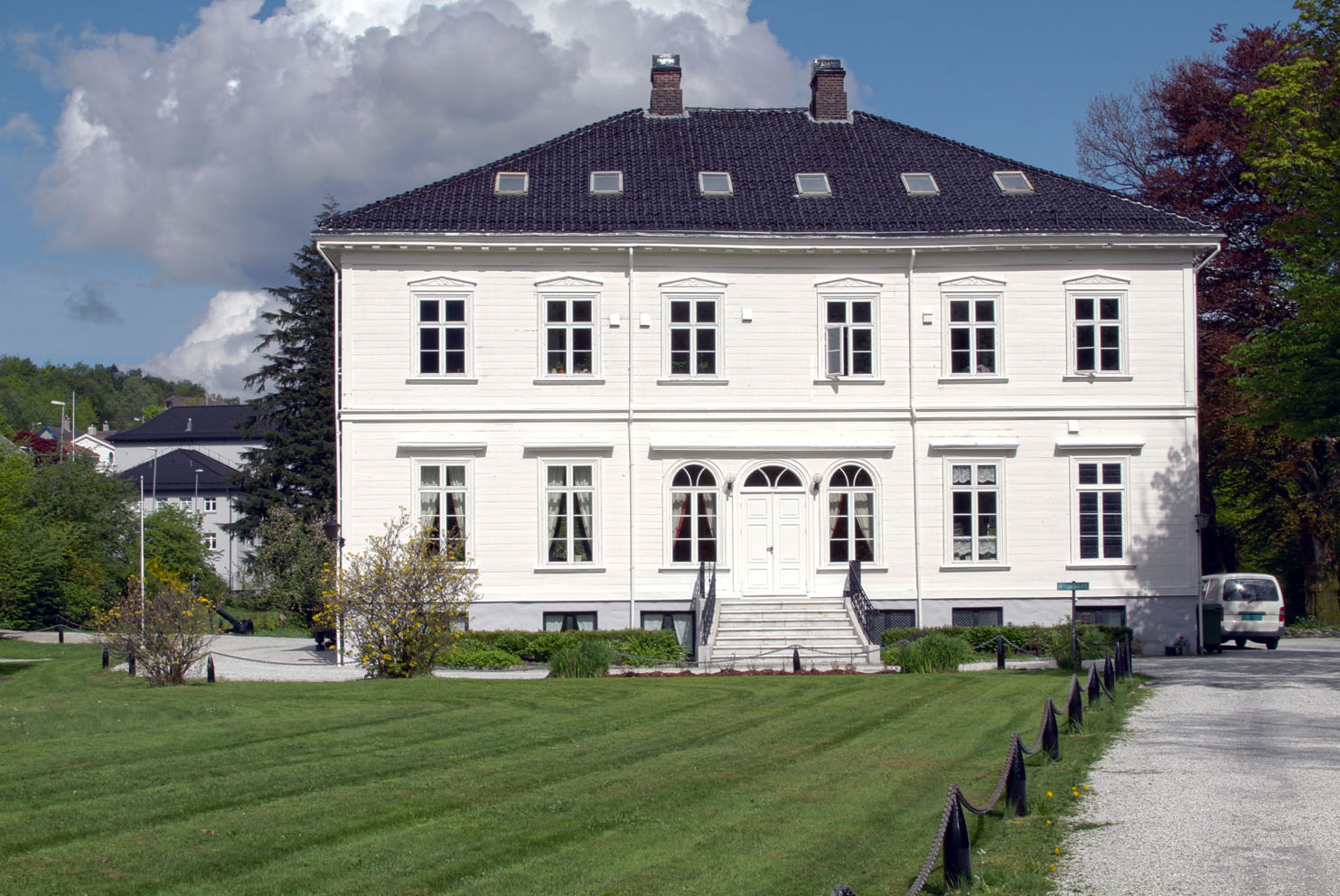
Gravdal Manor

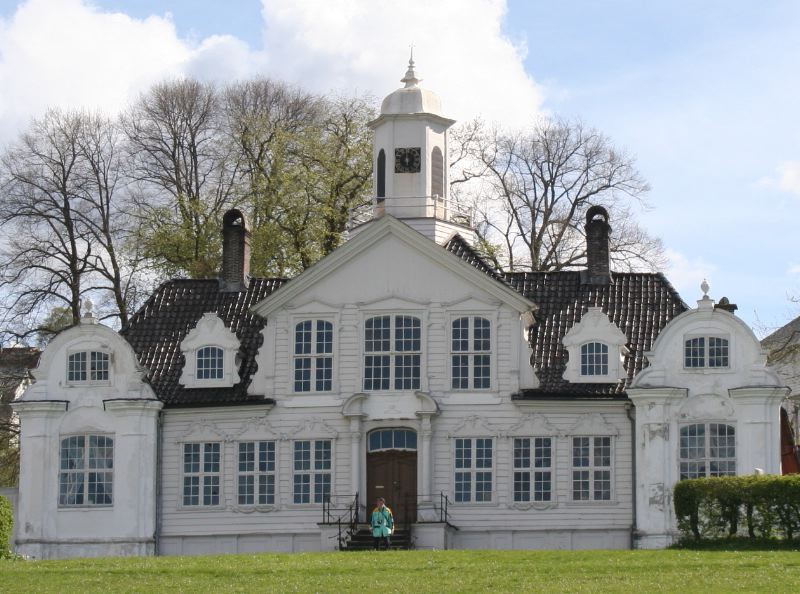
Damsgård Manor
