= Jarle Rykkje =

Norwegian handball player and coach

Personal information
- Full name: Jarle Haraldsen Rykkje
- Nationality: Norwegian
- Born: March 16, 1975 (age 51) Lørenskog, Norway
- Height: 174 cm (69 in)

Sport
- Sport: Handball
- Position: Wing
- Current club: Retired

Youth career
- Years: Team
- –: Kjøkkelvik

Senior clubs
- Years: Team
- 1995–2001: Fyllingen
- 2001–2004: Stavanger Håndball
- 2004–2006: Bjerringbro-Silkeborg
- 2006–2010: Fyllingen
National team
Years	Team	Apps	(Gls)
2001-2008	Norway	79	(122)

Jarle Haraldsen Rykkje (born 16 March 1975) is a Norwegian former handball player. Playing as a wing, he represented Norway 79 times between 2001 and 2008, scoring 122 goals, and competed at the 2005 World Men's Handball Championship. In club handball he played for Fyllingen and Stavanger Håndball in Norway and Bjerringbro-Silkeborg in Denmark, winning the Norwegian league title with Fyllingen in 2008–09. Following his retirement in 2010, he became a youth coach.

== Early life ==
Rykkje was born in Lørenskog, where he spent the first seven years of his life, before his family moved to the Kjøkkelvik/Olsvik area of Bergen. He is the eldest of three siblings. As a youth he played football as a goalkeeper for Kjøkkelvik and later Lyngbø, and was district champion in the long jump at age 13. He was recruited to handball through a programme aimed at local schools, and joined Fyllingen from Kjøkkelvik in 1995.

== Club career ==
=== Fyllingen (1995–2001) ===
Rykkje played for Fyllingen for six seasons before leaving in 2001. He made his national team debut against Germany in March 2001 while still with the club.

=== Stavanger Håndball (2001–2004) ===
Rykkje joined Stavanger Håndball in 2001. In an early meeting with his former club, which Stavanger won 23–19, he was the match's top scorer with seven goals. A year later he scored eight goals as Stavanger beat Fyllingen 37–24. He remained with Stavanger through the 2003–04 season, when the club took part in the EHF Cup Winners' Cup.

=== Bjerringbro-Silkeborg (2004–2006) ===
In early 2004 Rykkje left Stavanger for Bjerringbro in Denmark. He spent two seasons in Denmark, which he later described as a more prestigious league than the Norwegian top flight. He is listed in Bjerringbro-Silkeborg Håndbold's official hall of fame. In March 2006 he turned down an offer from Drammen HK and agreed to rejoin Fyllingen the following season, citing a wish to combine handball with work in Bergen.

=== Return to Fyllingen (2006–2010) ===
His comeback began with a setback: four or five matches in, he suffered a groin injury that kept him out for eight months. He went on to win the Norwegian league title with Fyllingen in 2008–09, and reached the Norwegian Cup final in December 2007, which Fyllingen lost to Drammen HK at Oslo Spektrum; Rykkje scored three of Fyllingen's goals. In his final season, 2009–10, he played in the EHF Champions League and helped Fyllingen win the Norwegian play-off title before retiring at the end of the season, aged 35.

== International career ==
Rykkje made his debut on the Norwegian national team in 2001, and played 79 matches for the national team between 2001 and 2008. He scored 122 goals, and his final cap came against Ukraine in 2008. He competed at the 2005 World Men's Handball Championship.

== Coaching career ==
After retiring, Rykkje returned to his boyhood club Kjøkkelvik as a youth coach, taking charge of boys' teams born in 1995, 1996 and 1997. The teams won all their pools at a handball festival in Stord shortly after he took over.
