= Mathopen =

- Neighborhood in Bergen
- Interactive map of Mathopen
- Coordinates: 60.3339°N 5.2128°E
- Country: Norway
- Region: Western Norway
- County: Vestland
- Municipality: Bergen
- Borough: Laksevåg
- Elevation: 41 m (135 ft)
- Time zone: UTC+01:00 (CET)
  - Summer (DST): UTC+02:00 (CEST)

Mathopen is a suburban village in the borough of Laksevåg in Bergen Municipality in Vestland county, Norway. It lies along the Grimstadfjorden, about 10 kilometres (6.2 mi) southwest of the city centre of Bergen and it is home to the large Haakonsvern military base.
