= Kjøkkelvik =

Neighborhood in Bergen, Norway

Coordinates: 60°23′16″N 5°13′40″E

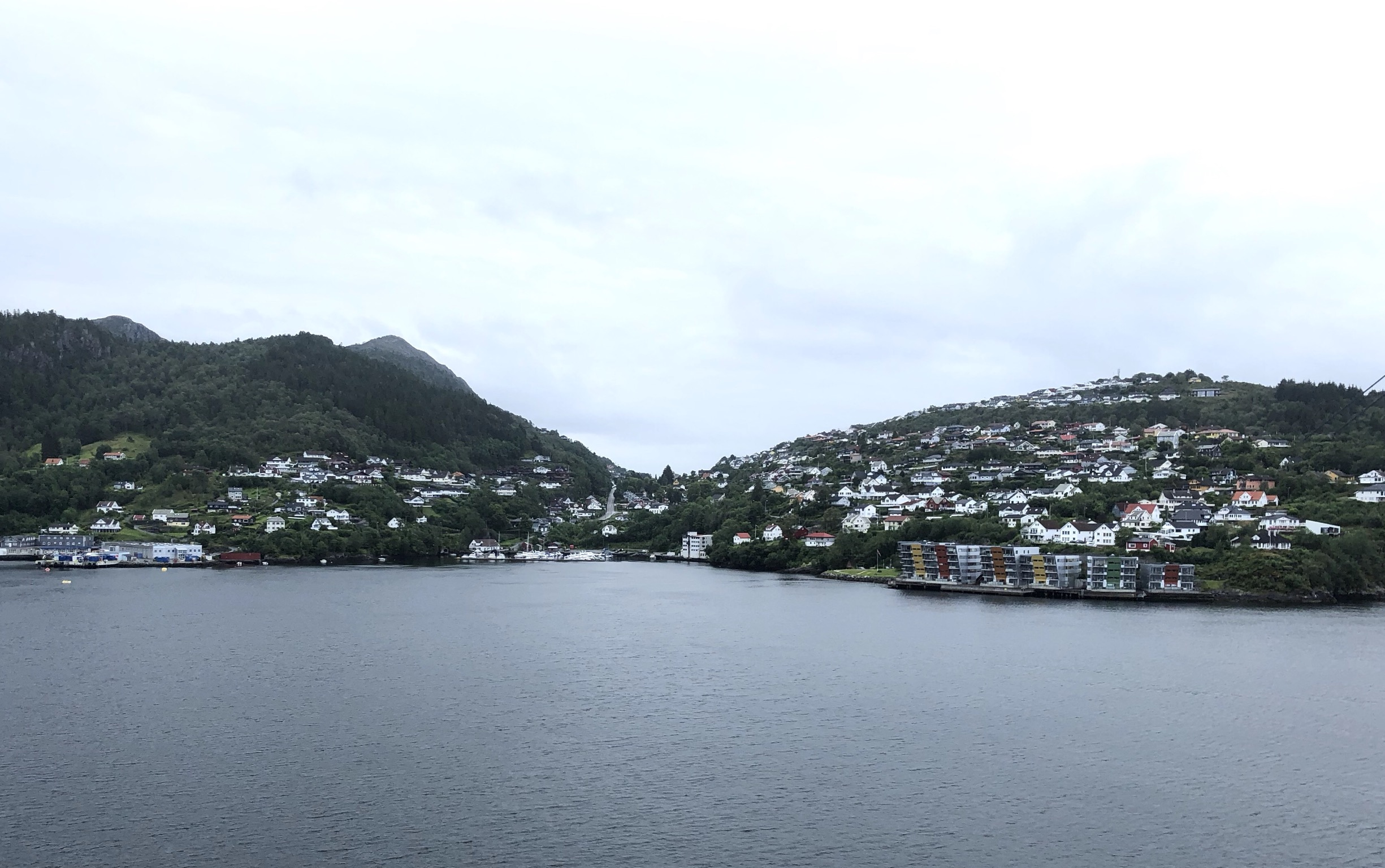
View of Kjøkkelvik

Kjøkkelvik is a mostly residential neighborhood of the city of Bergen in Vestland county, Norway. The neighborhood is located on the west side of the large mountain Lyderhorn in the borough of Laksevåg, along the coast of the Byfjorden. The Norwegian Diver School is located at Kjøkkelvik. The local multi-sports team is Kjøkkelvik IL. The southern base of the Askøy Bridge is located at Kjøkkelvik.
