= Haakonsvern Naval Base =

Royal Norwegian Navy's main base

- Haakonsvern orlogsstasjon
- Mathopen, Bergen, Vestland, Norway
- Coat of arms of the Royal Norwegian Navy Haakonsvern Naval Base

Site information
- Owner: Kingdom of Norway
- Operator: Royal Norwegian Navy

Location
- Location in Vestland Location in Norway
- Coordinates: 60°20′17″N 5°13′22″E

Site history
- In use: 7 June 1963-Present

Haakonsvern (lit. 'Haakon's fortress') is the main base of the Royal Norwegian Navy and the largest naval base in the Nordic area. The base is located at Mathopen within Bergen municipality, about 15 km south-west of the city centre. Around 5,400 people work at the base as conscripts, officers or civilian staff.

The base was established in 1963 when the main naval activities were moved from Horten in the Oslofjord to Bergen. It is the main base for most vessels within the Royal Norwegian Navy and frequently visited by allied vessels. Haakonsvern contains the Royal Norwegian Naval Training Establishment (KNM Tordenskjold) as well as repair and maintenance facilities, including an underground dock facility with the capacity to take frigates.
