= Olsvik =

Neighborhood in Bergen, Norway

Coordinates: 60.375596°N 5.226544°E

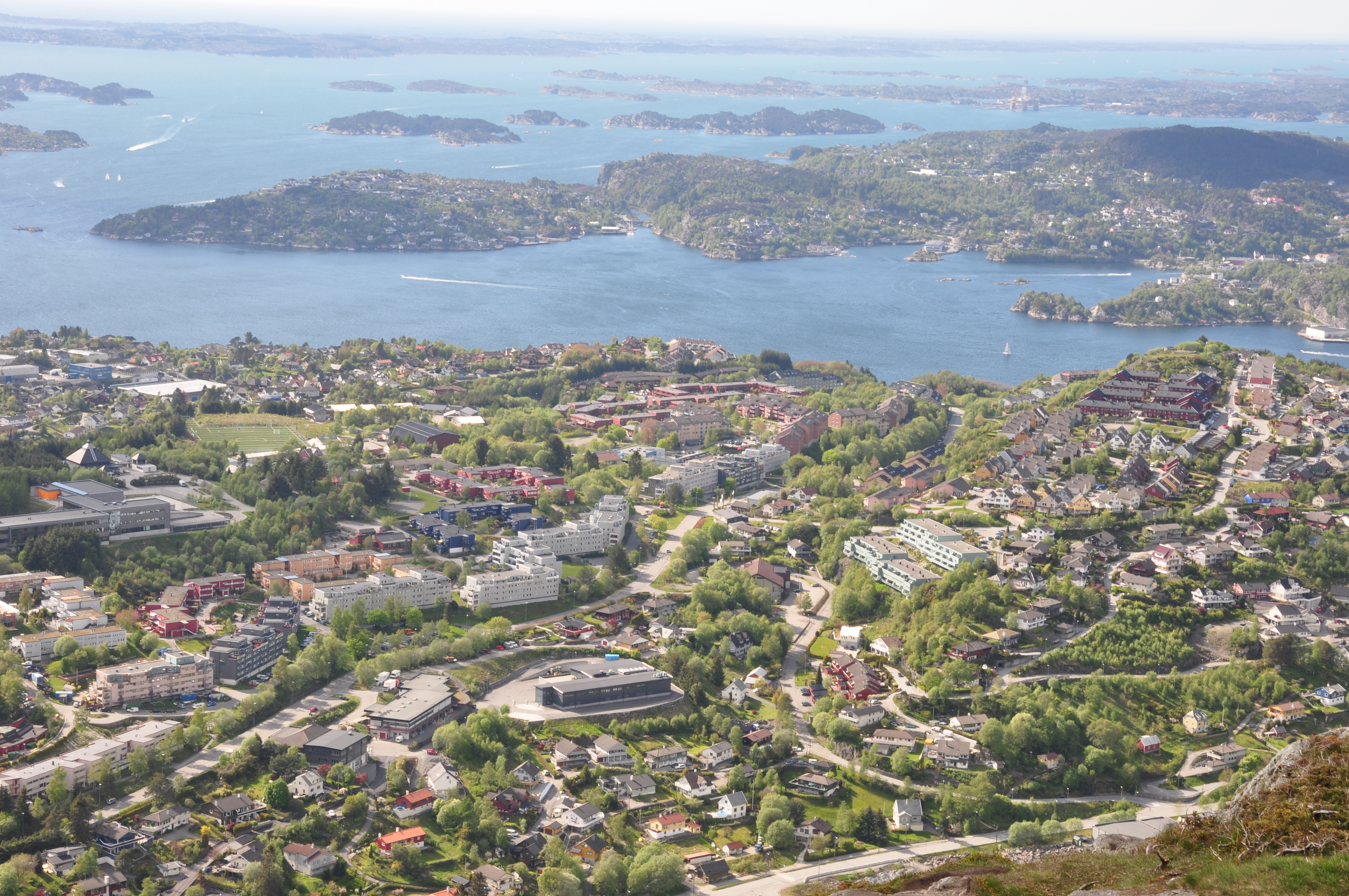
Olsvik neighborhood

Olsvik is a neighborhood in the city of Bergen in Vestland county, Norway. It is located in the western part of the borough of Laksevåg, just west of the mountain Lyderhorn. The area is dominated by low-rise residential areas. It features Olsvik School, Olsvikåsen Upper Secondary School, and Olsvik Church. Olsvik is east of Godvik, west of Kjøkkelvik, north of Loddefjorddalen and Storavatnet, and south of the Byfjorden. It consists of the basic statistical units Festeråsen, Olsvikstallen, Olsvikfjellet, Olsvikmarka, Fredheim, Olsvikåsen, and Brønndalen. As of 2009, it had 4,878 residents and covered 1.36 square kilometres (0.53 sq mi).

== Institutions ==
The SOS Children's Village in Olsvik was Norway's first.
