= Laksevåg Church =

Church in Vestland, Norway

- Laksevåg kirke
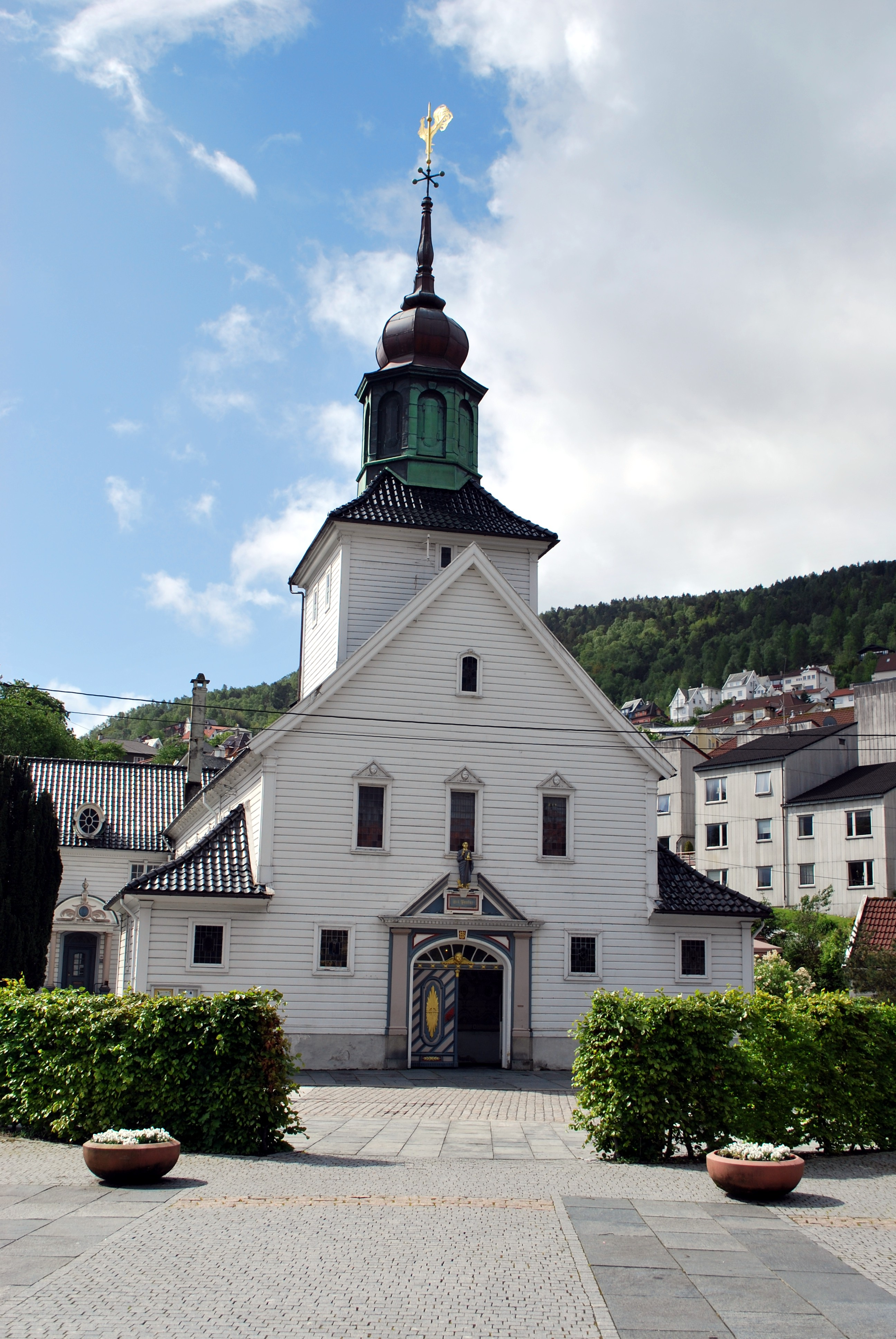
- View of the church
- Laksevåg Church
- 60°23′08″N 5°18′02″E
- Location: Bergen, Vestland
- Country: Norway
- Denomination: Church of Norway
- Churchmanship: Evangelical Lutheran

History
- Status: Parish church
- Founded: 1875
- Consecrated: 12 May 1875

Architecture
- Functional status: Active
- Architect(s): Peter Andreas Blix and T.A. Fromholz
- Architectural type: Long church
- Style: Neo Baroque
- Completed: 1875 (151 years ago)

Specifications
- Capacity: 432
- Materials: Wood

Administration
- Diocese: Bjørgvin bispedømme
- Deanery: Bergen domprosti
- Parish: Laksevåg
- Norwegian Cultural Heritage Site
- Type: Church
- Status: Listed
- ID: 84887

Laksevåg Church (Norwegian: Laksevåg kirke) is a parish church of the Church of Norway in Bergen Municipality in Vestland county, Norway. It is located in the borough of Laksevåg in the city of Bergen. It is the church for the Laksevåg parish which is part of the Bergen domprosti (arch-deanery) in the Diocese of Bjørgvin. The white, wooden church was built in a long church design in 1875 using plans drawn up by the architects Peter Andreas Blix and Theodor August Fromholz. The church seats about 432 people.

== History ==
In the early 1870s, plans were made for a new church in Laksevåg. It was built on the basis of architectural drawings by Peter Andreas Blix which was edited by another architect, Theodor August Fromholz. The lead builder for the project was Askild Aase. The church was built in 1874-1875 and it was consecrated on 12 May 1875. In 1885, a second sacristy was built on the west side of the choir. From 1915-1935, the church was rebuilt and expanded in several stages. During the construction work, the church was given more of a Neo Baroque architectural style. This work was planned first by Georg Greve (until 1927), and later by Thorolf Hals-Frølich. In 1993, a wing to the north was constructed to add more space in the church.

== Media gallery ==
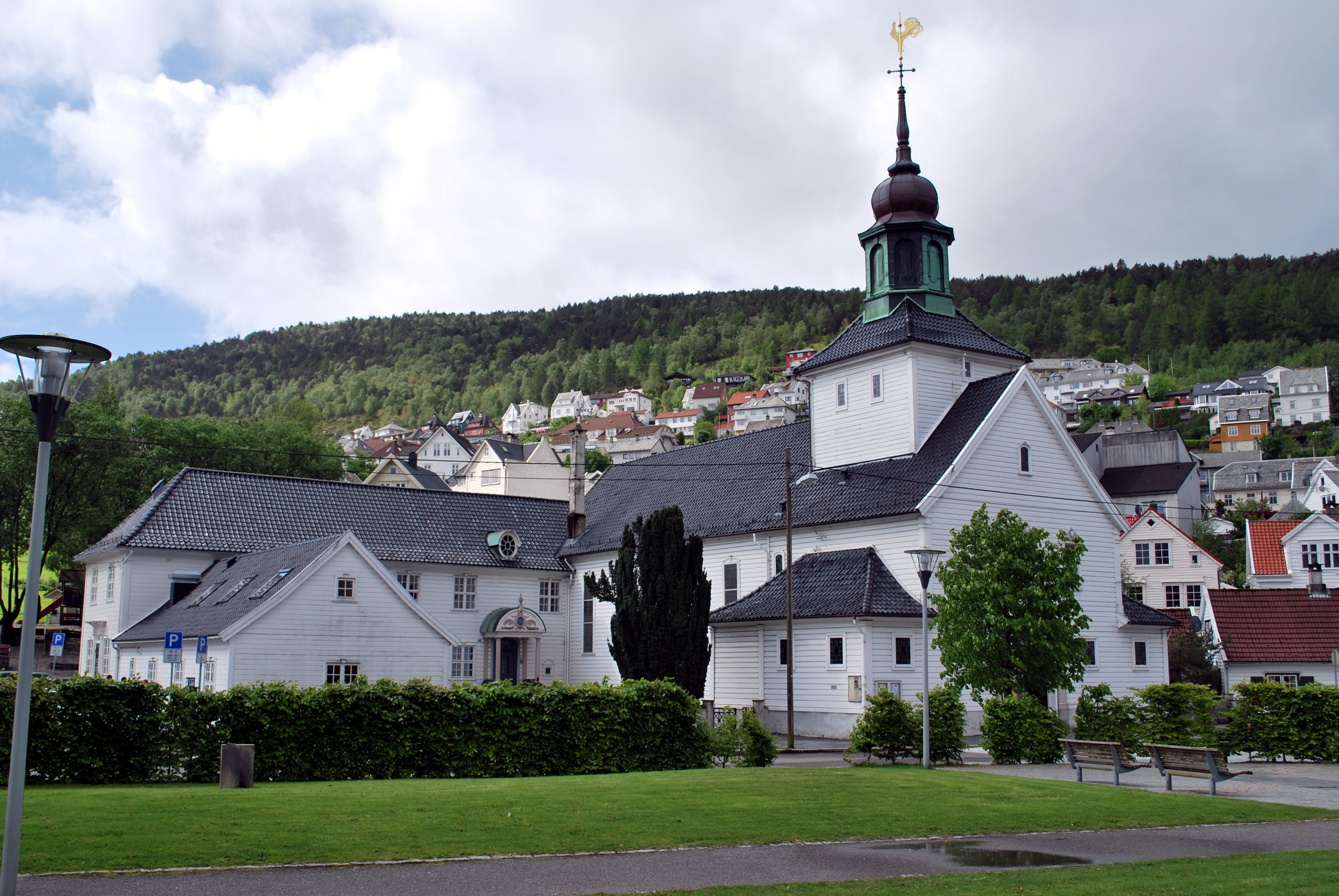
Exterior view

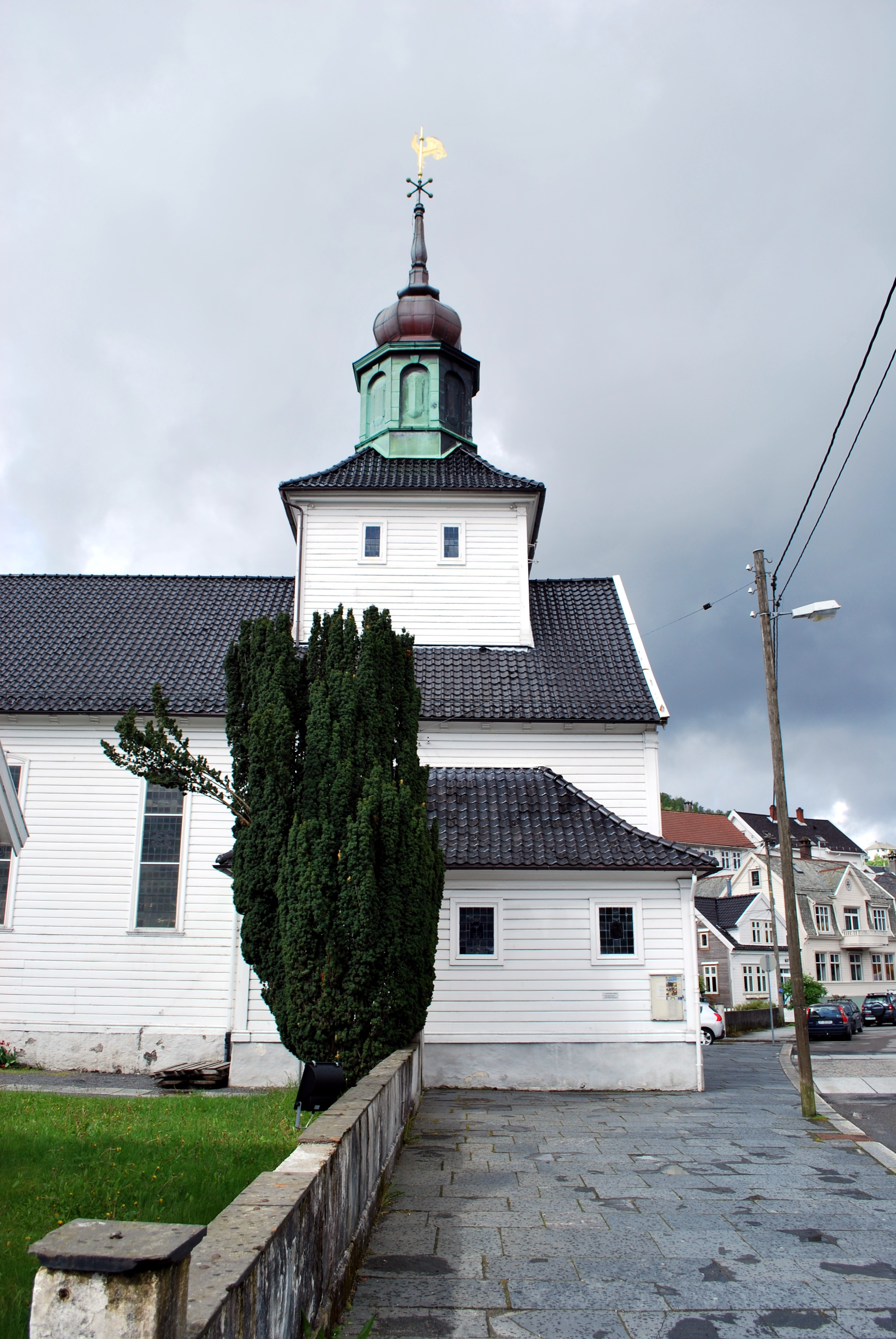
Side view

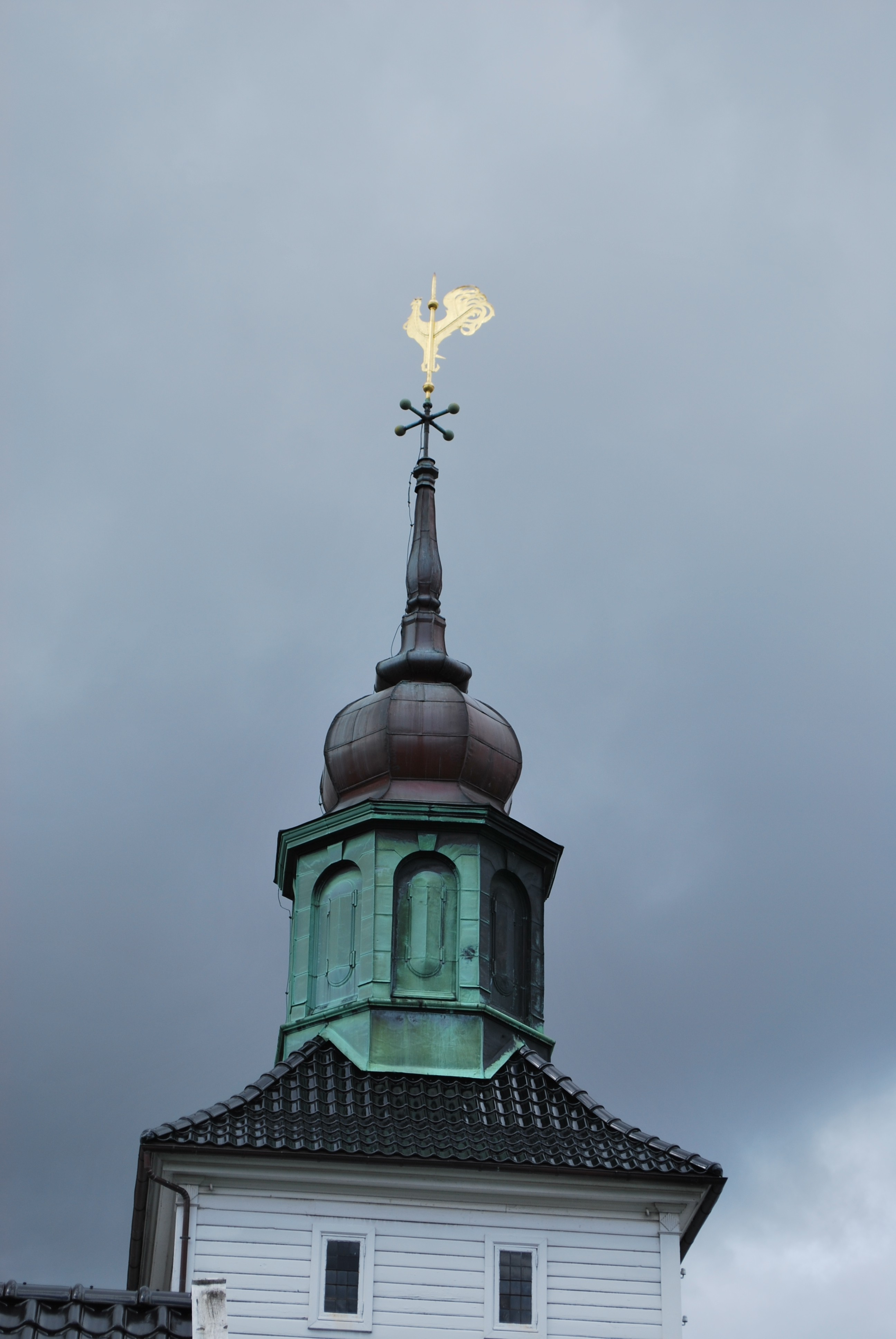
Steeple

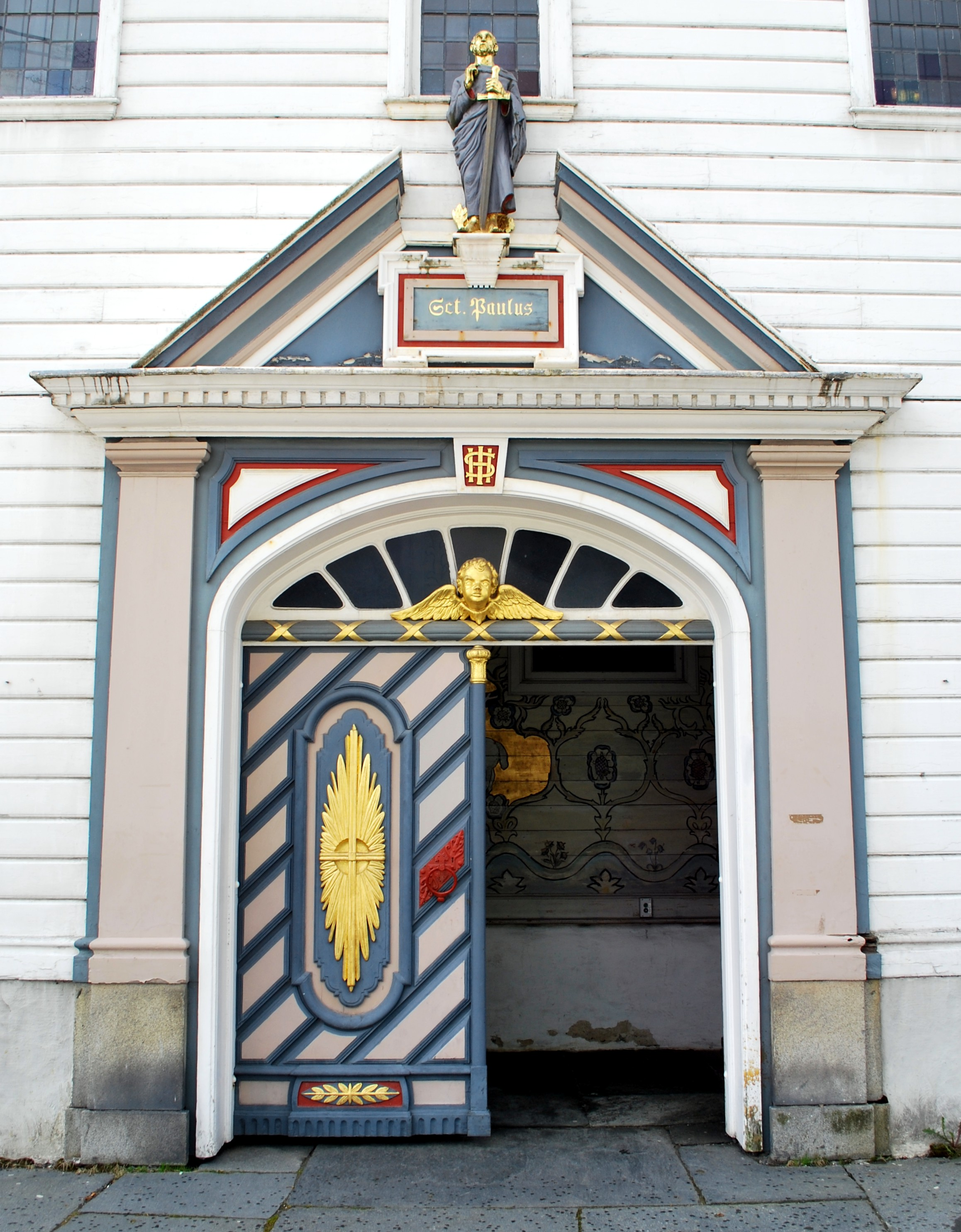
Front doors

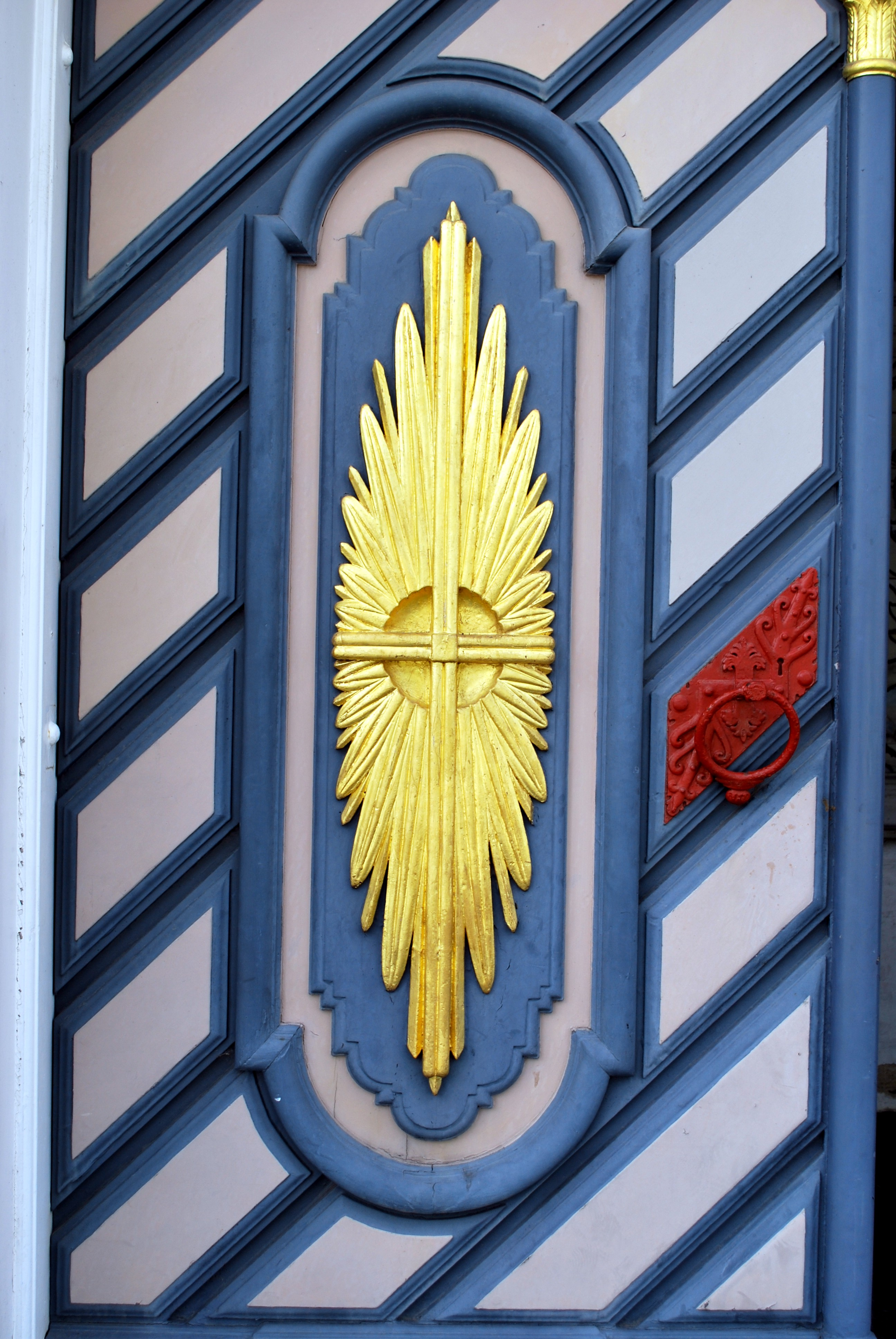
Closeup of front door designs

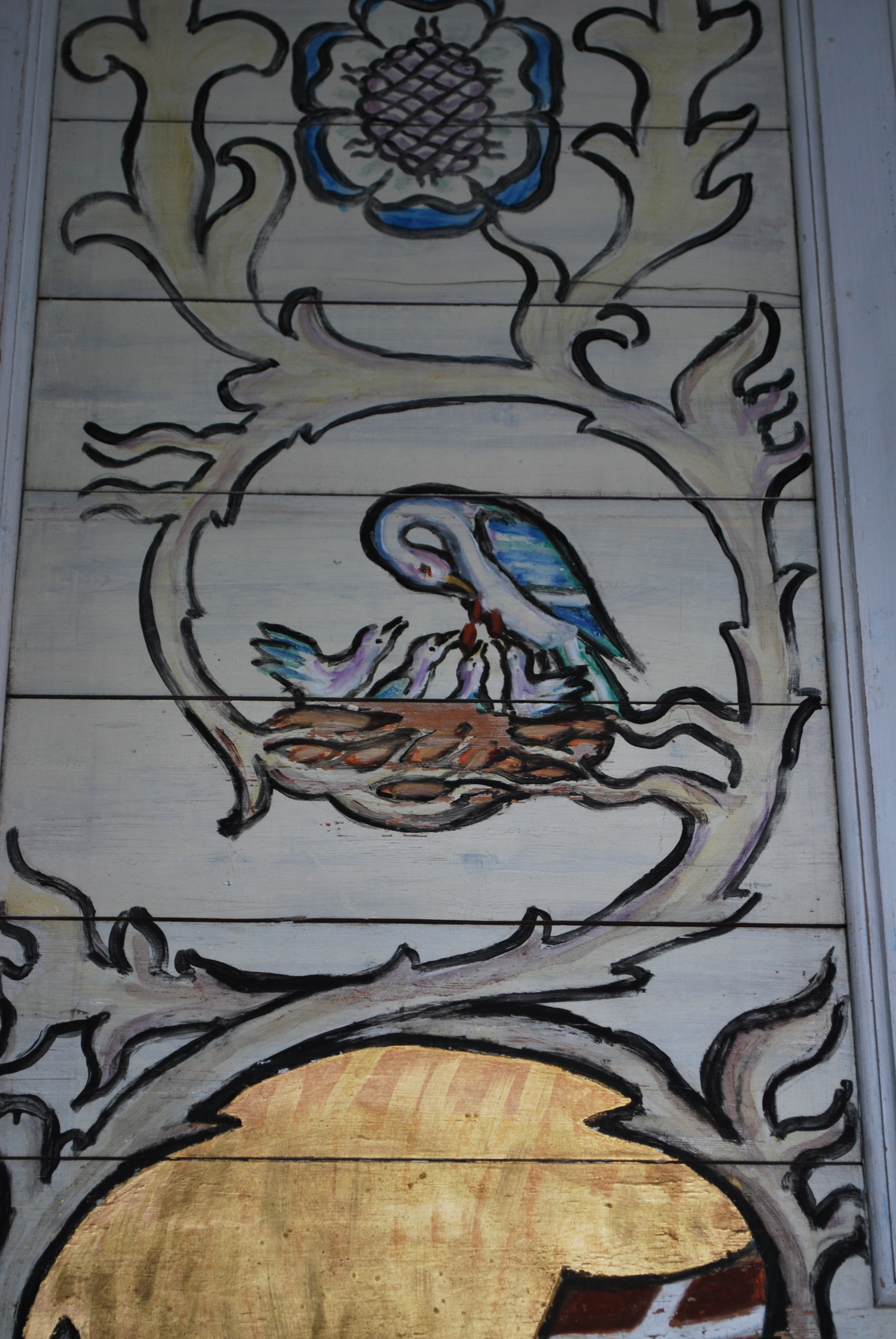
Interior wall design

== See also ==
- List of churches in Bjørgvin
