= Kvarven Fort =

Mountain fort in Bergen, Norway

Coordinates: 60°23′47.80″N 5°14′27.54″E

- Bergen, Norway
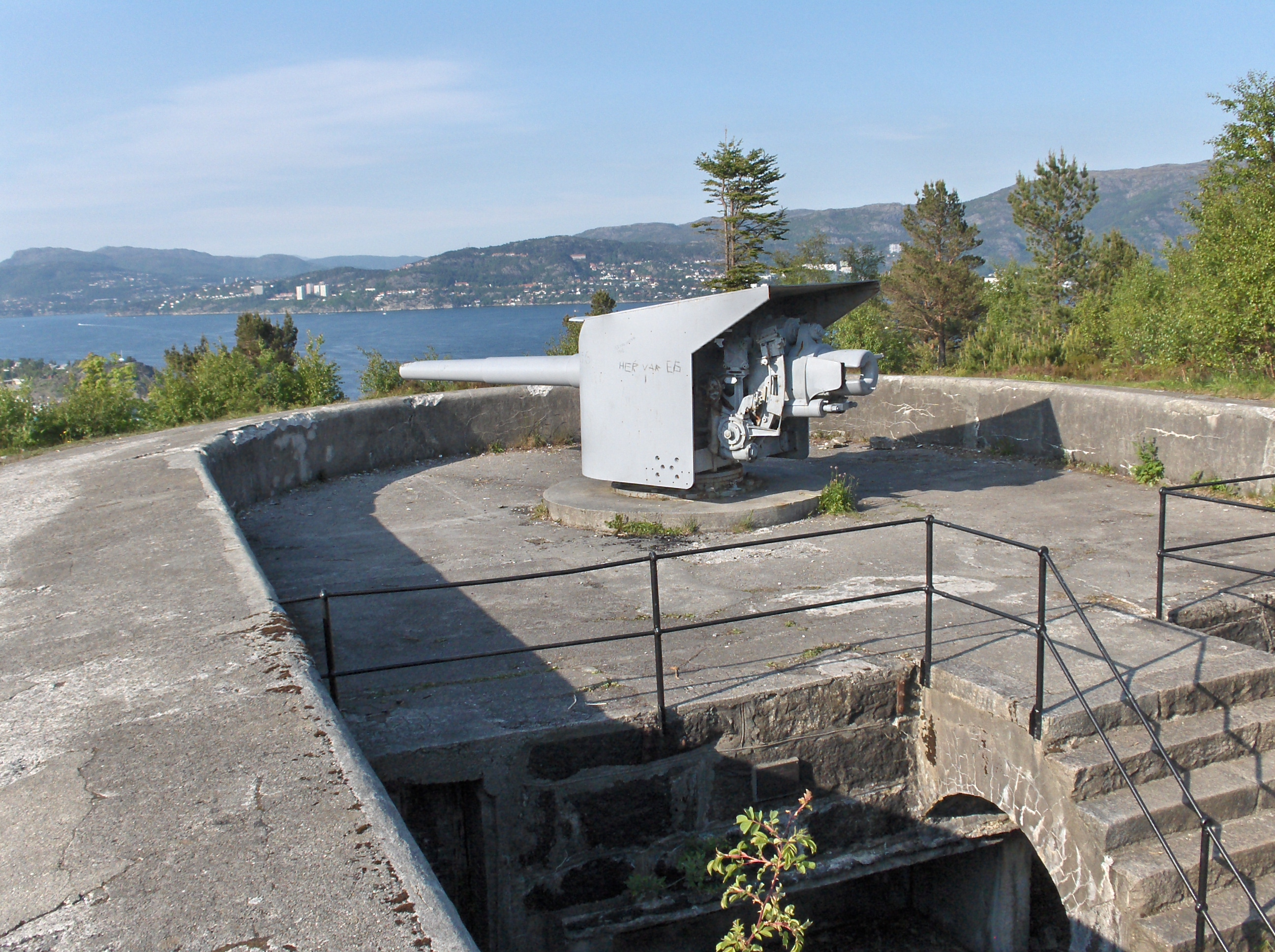

Site information
- Controlled by: Norway (1899-1940, 1945-present); Nazi Germany (1940-1945)

Site history
- Built: 1895-1902
- In use: 1899-1945
- Battles/wars: Operation Weserübung

Kvarven Fort was a mountain fort strategically located by the main shipping channel of the Byfjorden leading to Bergen, Norway.

== Construction ==
In the late 1800s, relations between the two countries in the union between Sweden and Norway had gradually worsened. Norwegians were discontented and wanted independence. In case of a violent dissolution of the union, new coastal defenses were built. In Bergen, several forts were built to defend the harbour and the naval installations at Marineholmen and Wallemsviken from Swedish seaborne attacks. Kvarven fort was one of these, along with Hellen Fort and batteries in Sandviken.

Construction of Kvarven Fort began in 1895. The military bought the nearby farm Bakke in 1898, and turned its stately main building into the commander's quarters. The fort construction was completed in 1899. An additional torpedo battery was in place by 1902. This and the Howitzer L/14 cannons made Kvarven a very modern fort for its time, though it did not have to fulfil its intended use as the union with Sweden dissolved peacefully in 1905.

== World War I ==
Norway was a neutral country in World War I. Kvarven Fort had a full complement of soldiers in order to maintain neutrality.

== World War II ==
Norway attempted to maintain neutrality during World War II as well, but was invaded by the Germans in their Operation Weserübung on April 9, 1940. The Bergen part of the operation was fronted by cruisers Königsberg and Köln, with a total of 1,900 German soldiers. Kvarven fort was manned by 33 officers and 279 corporals and privates with an average age of around forty. The fort failed to open fire at the first German ships of the invasion force, mistaking the armed trawlers Schiff 9 and Schiff 18 for unarmed merchant ships. When the fort finally opened fire at 3:58 in the morning, it only managed to get off a few shots through the fog at two torpedo boats and the cruiser Köln. The ships did not retaliate, but sent a morse coded message in English saying “stop shooting!“. Only the third wave of German ships were taken under effective fire by Kvarven. The fort first hit Bremse twice, then the MTB mothership Carl Peters once, compelling both ships to break off their attempt to force their way into the harbour. After these ships, the cruiser Königsberg tried to break through and was hit by three shells: one beneath the waterline, one on deck and the third hitting the conning tower. Königsberg was barely saved due to its own counter fire and great technical difficulties up at the fort.

Kvarven surrendered at ca. 07.00 am after a short infantry battle between the German landing forces and Krag–Jørgensen rifle armed gun crews from the fort. Defence by use of torpedoes was also possible, as Kvarven held one of only two land-based torpedo batteries in Norway at the time, and, after the alarm from detection of German attack at Oslo had gone out, a torpedo boat was maneuvering into position nearby. The other land-based torpedo battery, at Oscarsborg Fortress, defended Oslo against the simultaneous German invasion there and featured underwater release of its torpedoes. It was unknown to German military intelligence. Two obsolete torpedoes from the Oscarsborg Fortress fired at 4:34 am finished off gun-damaged German heavy cruiser Blücher, which finally sank at 07:30 am, just a short while after the Karven fort surrendered. The Karven torpedo battery, on the other hand, was designed to launch its torpedoes by torpedo tube from above ground, and presumably the Germans could have known about it and planned countermeasures in some way, and in fact their landings on both sides of Korven were likely part of that. But according to a Norwegian military history website, no torpedoes in the battery could be fired, because all were missing their fuses and gyroscopes. Another nearby line of the torpedo defense was just then available: torpedo boat Brand, with fully functioning torpedoes, had moved into an excellent position in the Gravdalsviken inlet partly defined by Kvarven's peninsula, just past, where it would have a 700-1000 meter firing shot opportunity on passing German ships, and it could likely have sunk one or more German ships. But the boat's commander inexplicably chose not to fire any torpedoes and to abandon the boat, instead. The Brand was used with success by the Germans, with some immunity from air attacks because of confusion on its identity, during the next few days, and also was useful for the duration of their occupation of Norway.

German naval personnel manned the fort for the rest of the war, incorporating it into their Festung Bergen defence. During this period, the fort was extended and modernised.

== Today ==
The fortress was closed for military use in 1961. Kvarven Fort opened in 1993 as a preserved cultural area open to the public. It is a popular area to explore for tourists and locals alike, and the area is also an entry to Lyderhorn and Ørnafjellet for hikers. It is now a recreational area on the shore of Byfjorden.

== See also ==
- Occupation of Norway by Nazi Germany

== Related reading ==
- Petrow, Richard (1974) The Bitter Years; The Invasion and Occupation of Denmark and Norway, April 1940-May 1945 (London: William Morrow & Co.) ISBN 978-068800-275-6
- Haarr, Geirr (2012) The German Invasion of Norway: Apr-40 (Seaforth Publishing) ISBN 9781783469673
