= Lyderhorn =

Mountain in Bergen, Norway

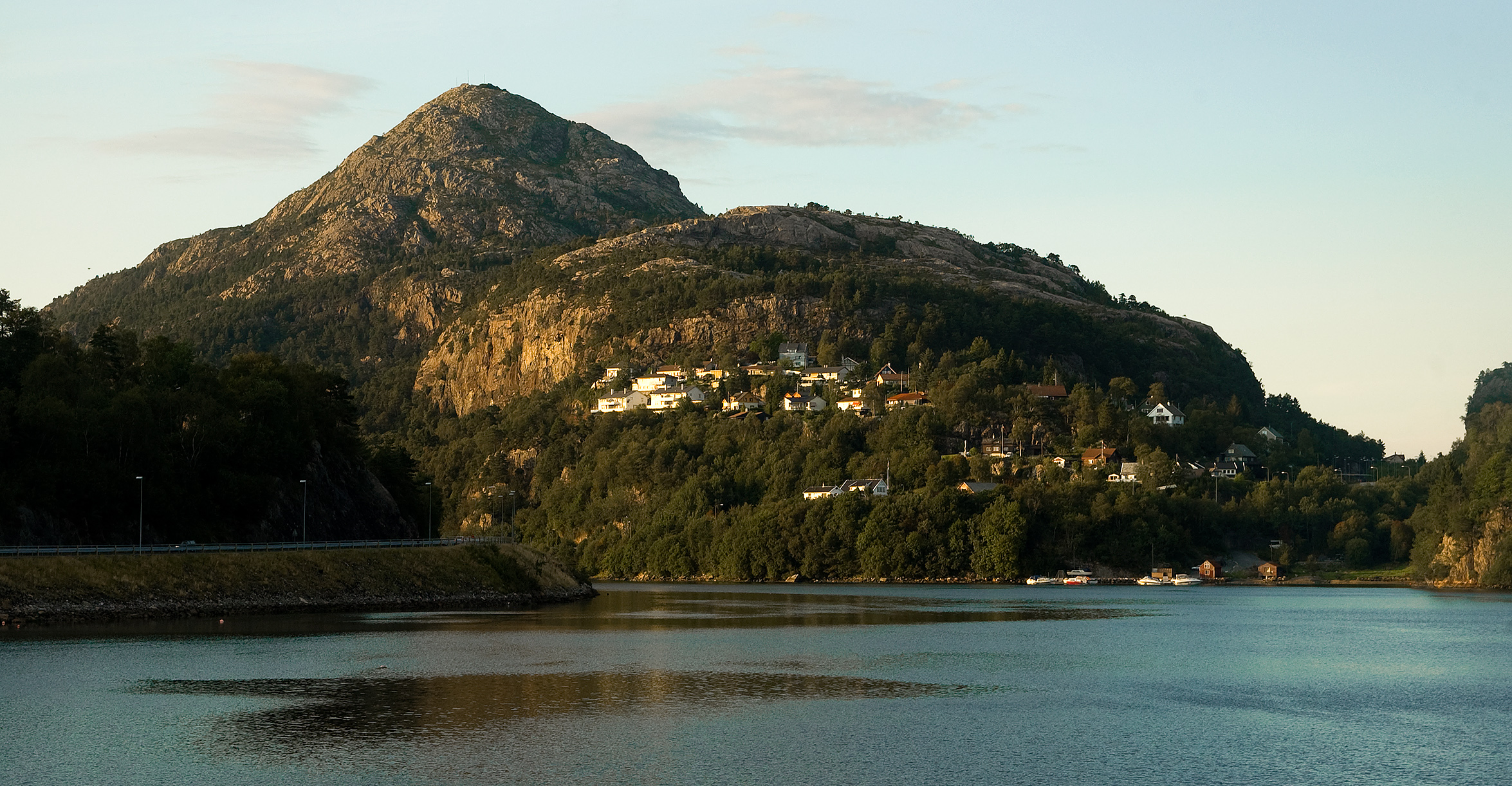
- Lyderhorn seen from south of Loddefjord in Laksevåg borough.

Highest point
- Elevation: 397 m (1,302 ft)
- Prominence: 348 m (1,142 ft)
- Parent peak: Løvstakken
- Isolation: 4.5 km (2.8 mi)
- Coordinates: 60°22′26″N 5°14′31″E

Geography
- Location: Vestland, Norway
- Topo map: 1115 I Bergen

Lyderhorn is a mountain in Bergen Municipality in Vestland county, Norway. It is one of "De syv fjell", the seven mountains surrounding the city centre of Bergen. It is the starting location of Bergen Turlag's annual trip of the mountains. It is located by Liavatnet approximately 5 kilometres (3.1 mi) west of the city center. Due to its prominent visibility from the seas, it has historically been a navigational mark for sailors. The 329-metre (1,079 ft) tall Ørnafjellet is an adjacent peak, and below Ørnafjellet are the two lakes Skåleviksvatnet and Søre Skåleviksvatnet. North of Ørnafjellet is Kvarven fort, a strategic point during World War II, still featuring several bunkers and cannon positions used in the defense of Bergen. Lyderhorn, Ørnafjellet, and Kvarven are popular hiking areas.

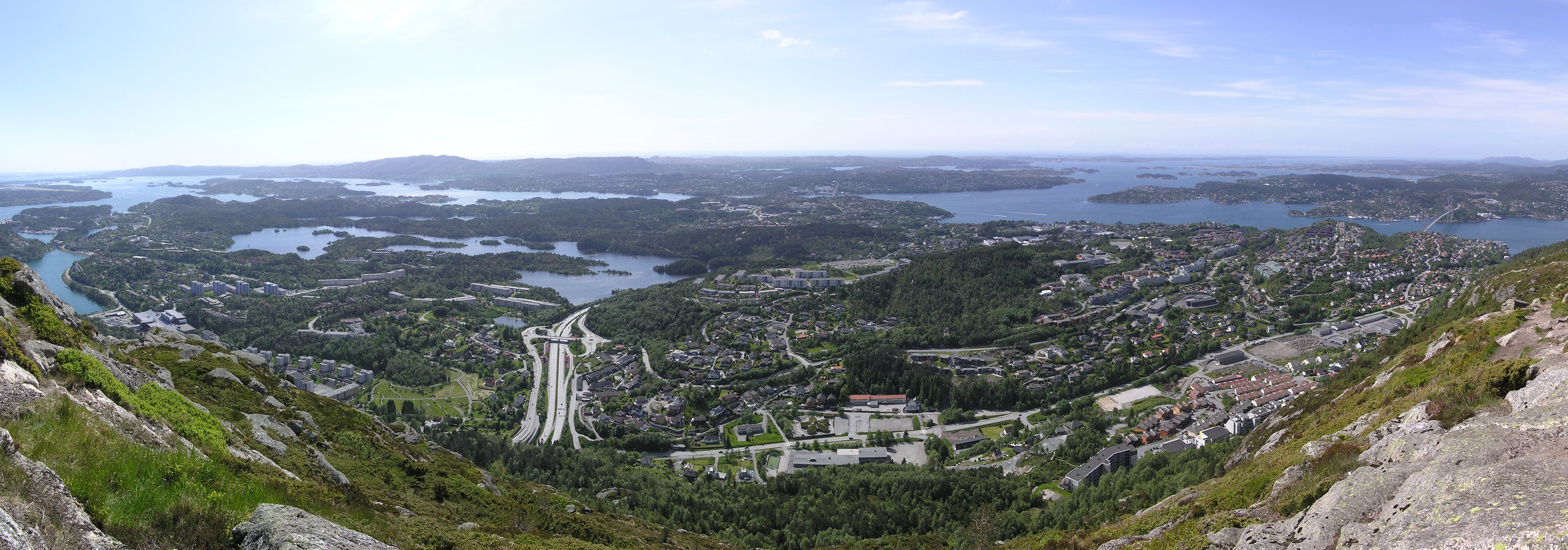
Lyderhorn view towards west

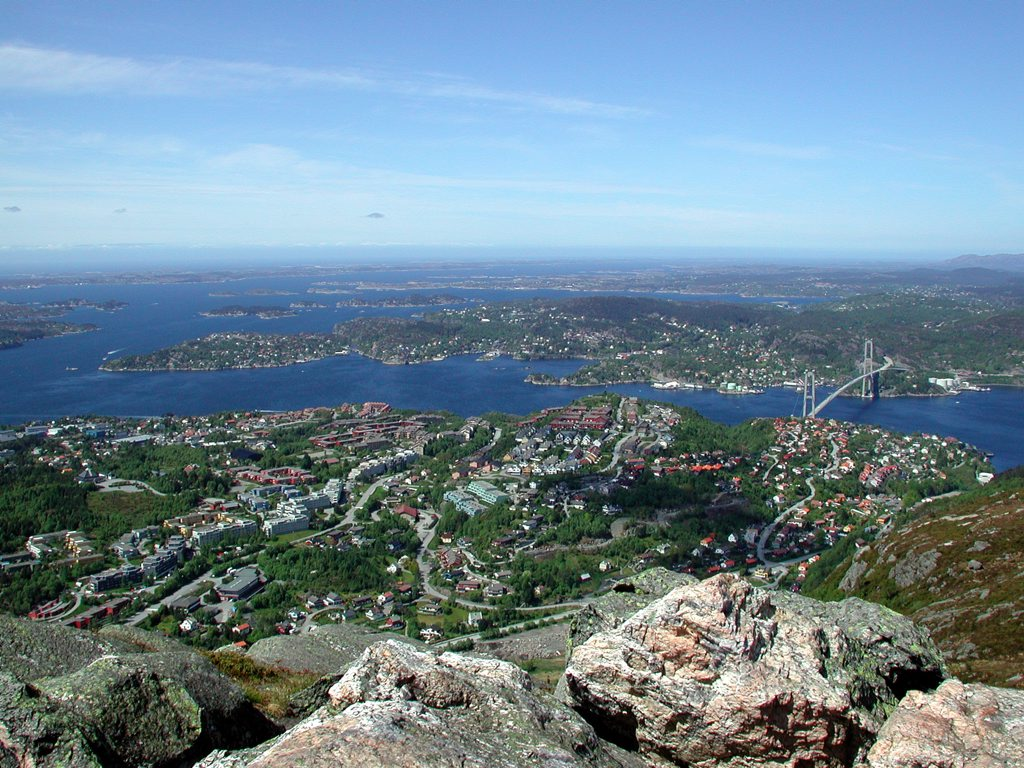
View from Lyderhorn toward Askøy Municipality and Øygarden Municipality.

Folklore has it that Lyderhorn was a gathering location for witches on Midsummer night, Valborg night (the night of May 1), and at Yule.

== See also ==
- List of mountains of Norway
