= Gyldenpris =

Neighborhood in Bergen, Norway

Coordinates: 60°22′49.897″N 5°18′47.747″E

Gyldenpris is a neighborhood in Bergen, Norway in the borough of Årstad.

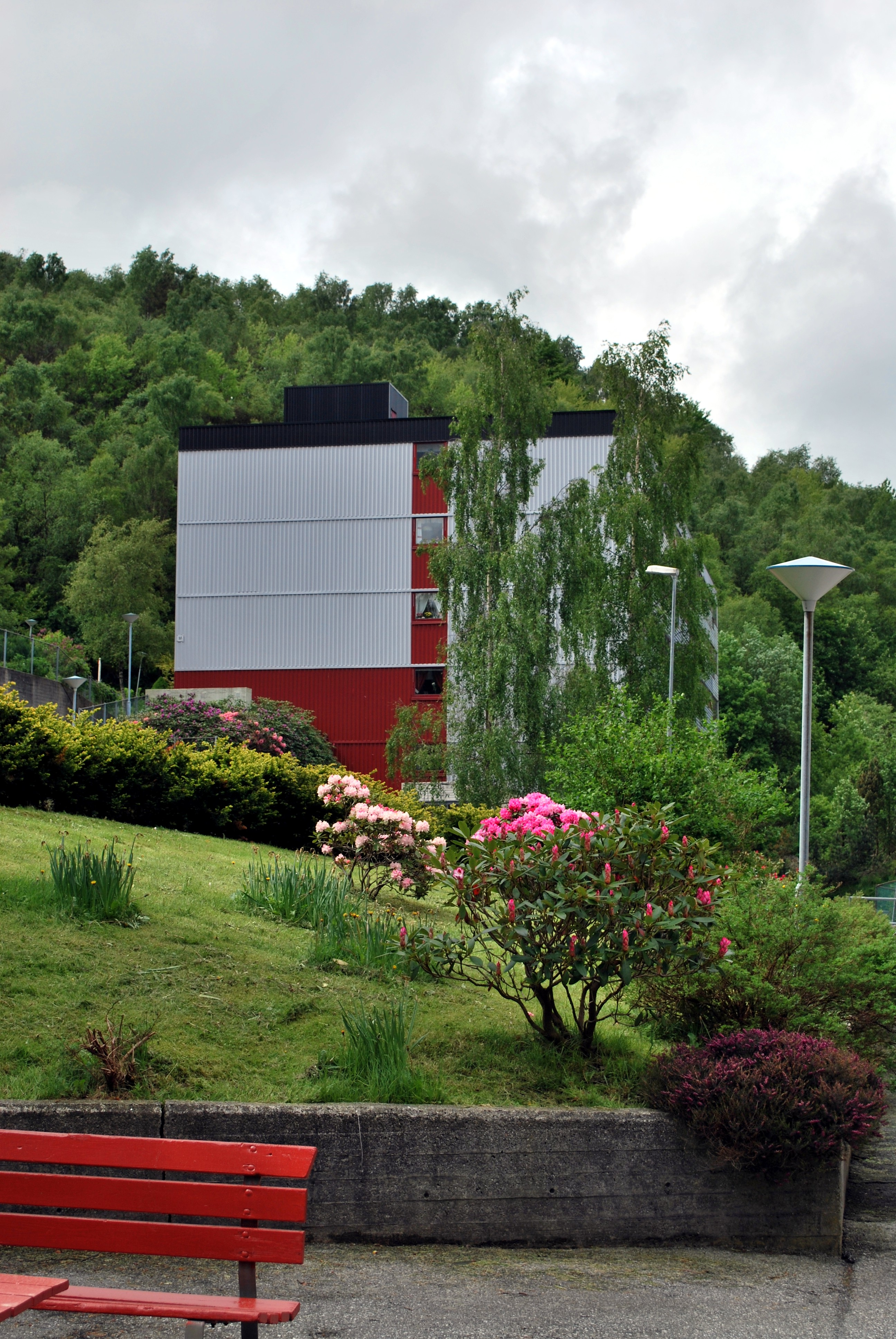
Apartment block in the Münsterbekken Housing Cooperative in Gyldenpris

== Geography ==
Gyldenpris lies on the border between the boroughs of Årstad and Laksevåg, with the Solheim neighborhood to the southeast, the Damsgård neighborhood to the northwest, Pudde Fjord to the northeast, and Mount Løvstakken to the south.

Gyldenpris has an area of 0.26 square kilometers (0.10 sq mi) and had 1,734 inhabitants on January 1, 2015. It is divided into basic statistical units named Gyldenpris (in the Laksevåg district), Stranden, and Strandlien (in the Årstad district). It includes 274 apartments in Mûnsterbekken Housing Cooperative in the Øvre Damsgård basic statistical unit (with a Frydenbølien address). Gyldenpris contains the Parish of Løvstakksiden, part of the Church of Norway's Bergen Deanery. St. Mark's Church, the parish church, stands to the south near the border with the Solheim neighborhood. Nearby there are also the Urdi House, an example of Empire style architecture, and the Gyldenpris student housing complex.

== History ==
The name Gyldenpris is derived from a hobby farm from the 1700s, which was separated from Damsgård. The farm's main house stood until 1955.

Industry developed along the Damsgård Straits (Damsgårdssundet) towards the end of the 1800s. The municipality of Bergen municipality purchased real estate at Gyldenpris and Stranden (collectively known as Gyldenpris) in 1912 and had plans to develop urban districts there. The area was administratively separated from the municipality of Laksevåg and annexed to Bergen, with about 1700 residents, in 1921. Gyldenpris was linked closer to Bergen when the Puddefjord Bridge to the Møhlenpris neighborhood opened in 1956.

=== "Blood Town" ===
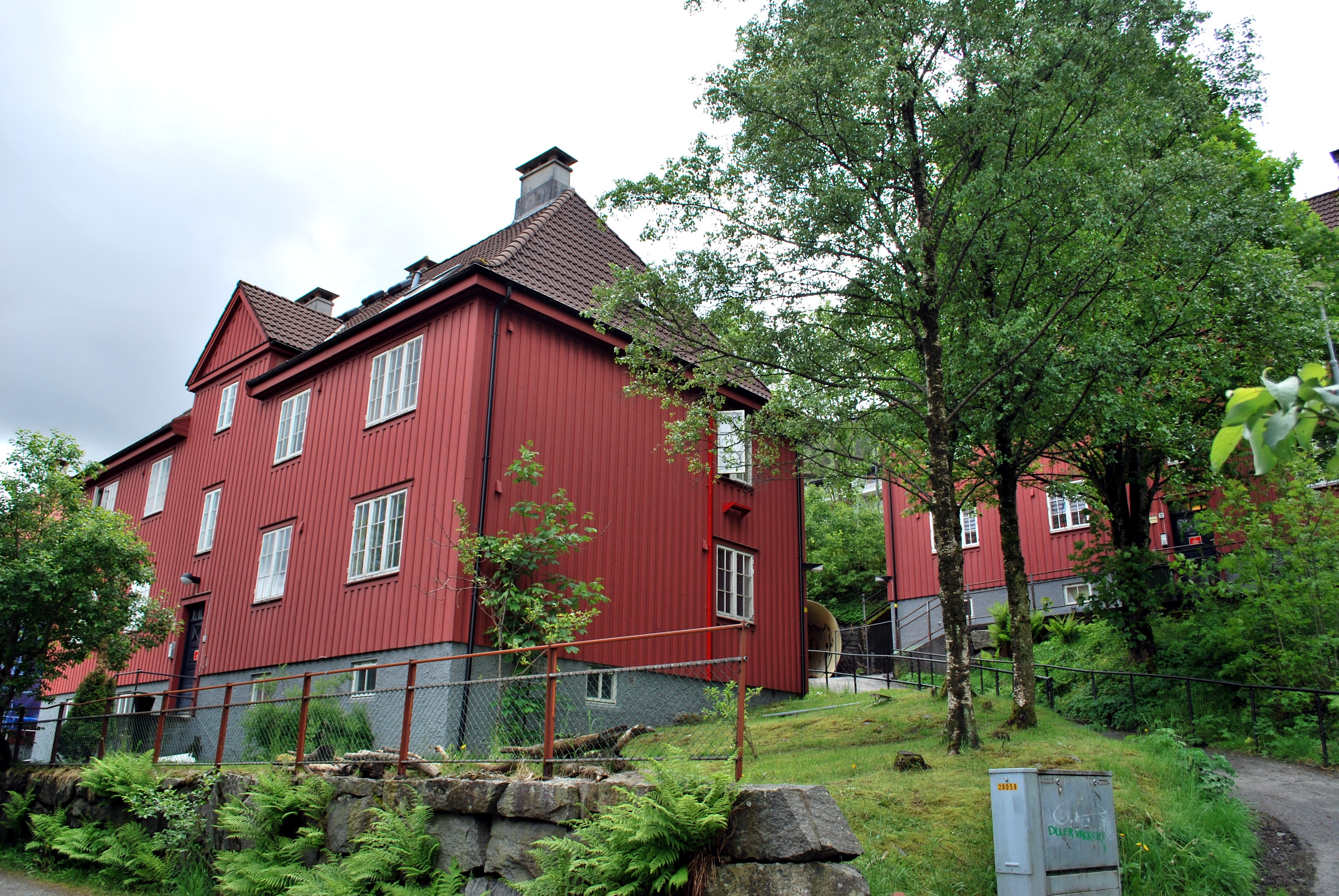
One of the remaining buildings in "Blood Town"

After the Bergen fire of 1916, the municipality of Bergen built a shantytown in the area where the Puddefjord Bridge now stands. It was an effort to help those left homeless in Bergen. All of the buildings were painted a blood-red color, which resulted in the place being nicknamed "Blood Town" (Norwegian: Blodbyen). Eventually, this nickname also referred to fighting and other trouble in this area. In 1977 the former soccer player Odd Frantzen was kicked to death in Gyldenpris, where he has also been born. Most of the houses in "Blood Town" were razed in connection with the construction of the Puddefjord Bridge, the Løvstakken Tunnel, and the new road on the west side of Pudde Fjord. One of the six houses remaining from "Blood Town" has served for many years as the clubhouse and dressing room for the Orion soccer club, which has its home field at the Gyldenpris soccer field (Norwegian: Gyldenprisbanen). Recently, sections of the Ny-Krohnborg IL athletic association have moved into the clubhouse. The other five remaining houses function today as municipal residential training centers for people with drug problems.

=== Development ===
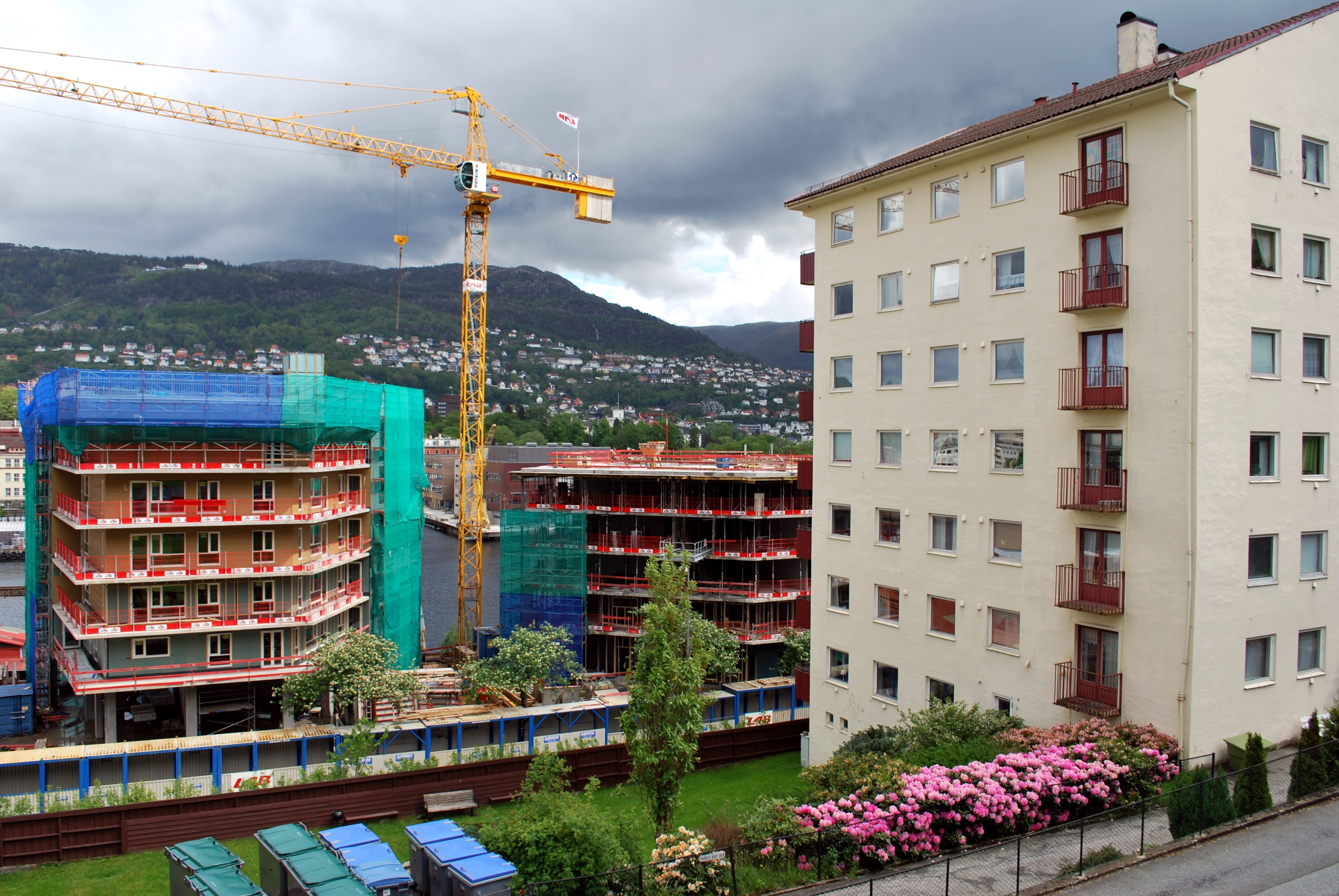
Apartment building from the 1950s and new buildings being built in May 2011.

In the 1950s, Gyldenpris became more densely settled because of the limited supply of building land within Bergen's city limits. The solution to the housing shortage at that time was to build higher. In 1951, the Vestbo housing company built three typical seven-story tower blocks operated by Stranden Boliglag AS (75 units). Later larger apartment blocks were built. The Münsterbekken Housing Cooperative (274 units) was built by Arne Sande AS in 1978, and housing became denser in 1980, when the BOB company built 72 units in the Gyldenpris Housing Cooperative. The most recent major expansion took place in 2004, when the Student Welfare Organization in Bergen built an apartment building with 157 units in the area between the former Høyes winery building and the Gyldenpris soccer field.

== Sights and landmarks ==
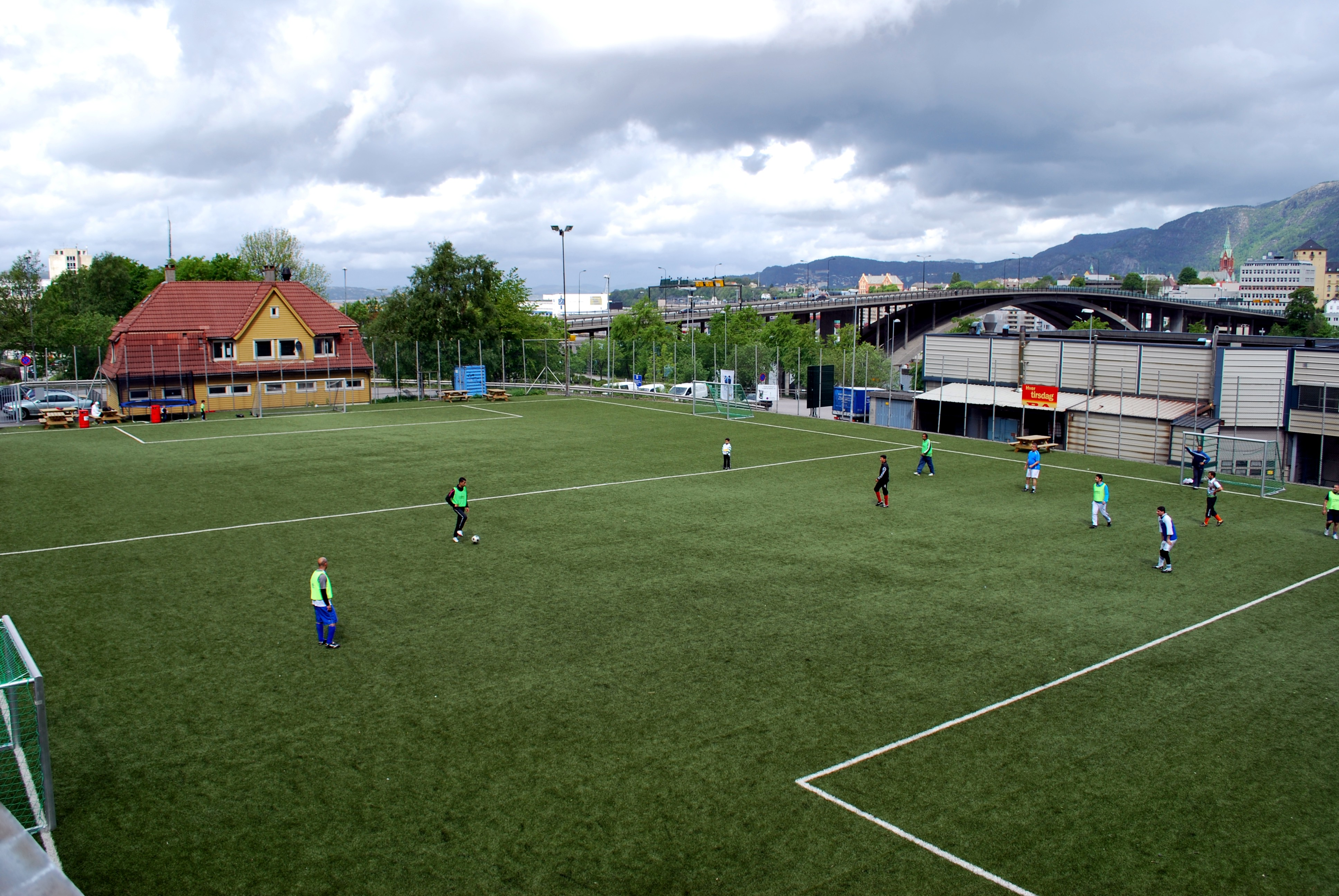
Gyldenpris soccer field

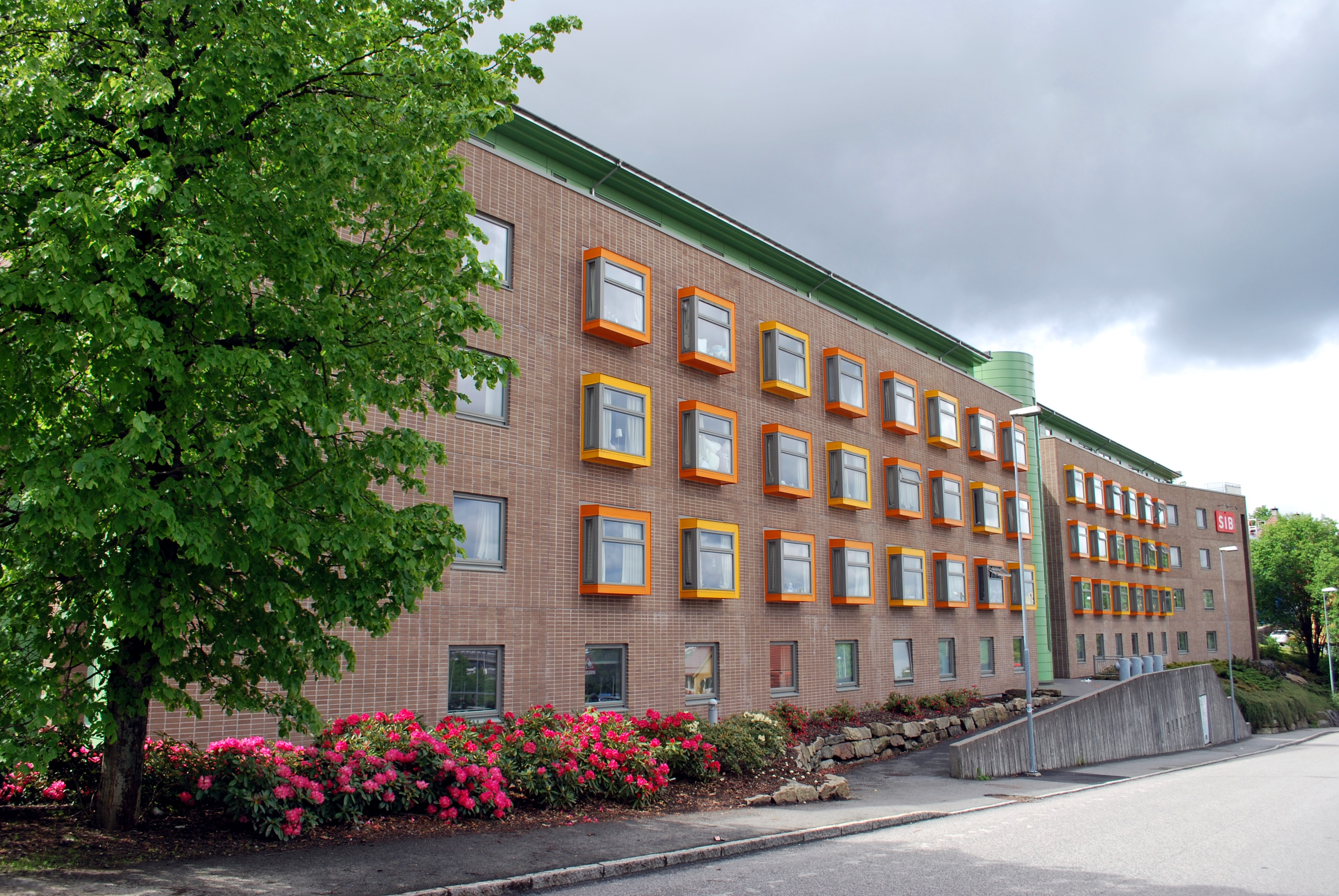
Student apartments

- Damsgårdstuene Spiseri (restaurant)
- Gyldenpris soccer field
- Gyldenpris preschool
- Høyes winery building
- Karsten Moholt AS (electrical machinery)
- Münsterbekken Housing Cooperative
- Puddefjord Bridge
- SIB housing in Gyldenpris
- Tower blocks
- Urdi House
