= Damsgård Tunnel =

Road tunnel in Bergen, Norway

Damsgård Tunnel Damsgårdstunnelen
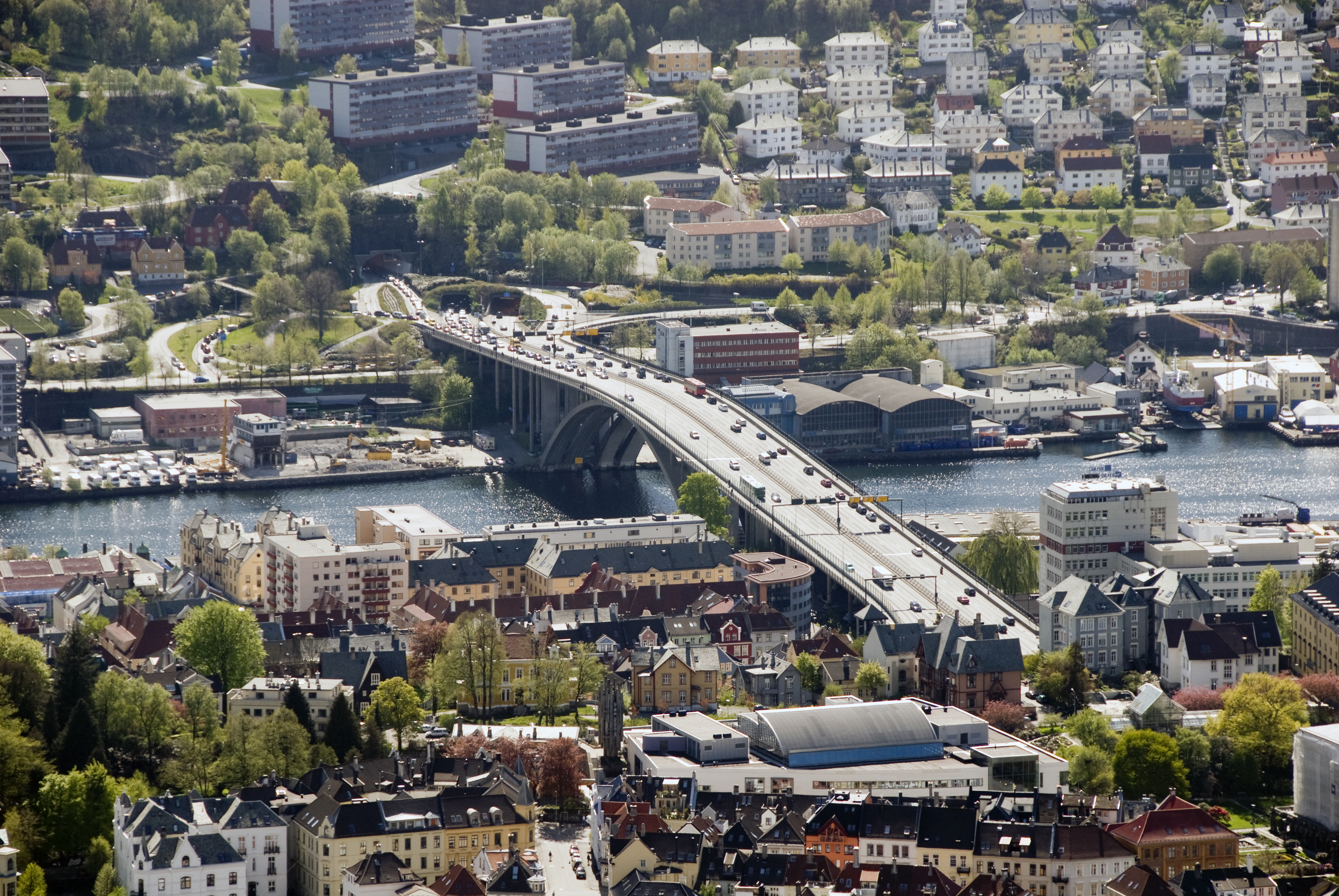
- View of the northern entrance to the tunnel (the Løvstakk Tunnel entrance is in the background-center, the Damsgård Tunnel has dual tubes, located left of center)
- Interactive map of Damsgård Tunnel; Damsgårdstunnelen

Overview
- Location: Vestland, Norway
- Coordinates: 60.3811°N 5.29444°E
- Status: In use
- Route: Rv555
- Start: Gyldenpris
- End: Lyngbø

Operation
- Opened: 1993
- Operator: Norwegian Public Roads Administration

Technical
- Length: 2,360 m (7,740 ft)
- No. of lanes: 4

The Damsgård Tunnel (Norwegian: Damsgårdstunnelen) is a road tunnel in the city of Bergen in Vestland county, Norway. It consists of two tubes, each of which carries two lanes of traffic through the Damsgårdsfjellet mountain between the neighborhoods of Lyngbø and Gyldenpris and the onwards towards the city centre. The northern end of the tunnel lies adjacent to the entrance to the Løvstakk Tunnel and the Puddefjord Bridge. The tunnel is one of the major arterial highways leading west from the city centre.

The tube that carries eastbound traffic was opened in 1992 and it is 2,360-metre (7,740 ft) long, while the other tube opened the following year and it is slightly shorter at 2,342-metre (7,684 ft) long. The Damsgård Tunnel is part of Norwegian National Road 555 which runs from the island of Sotra in Øygarden Municipality to Bergen's city centre. The average daily traffic through the Damsgård Tunnel was 35,127 vehicles in 2007, up from 29,336 in 2000.
