= Puddefjord Bridge =

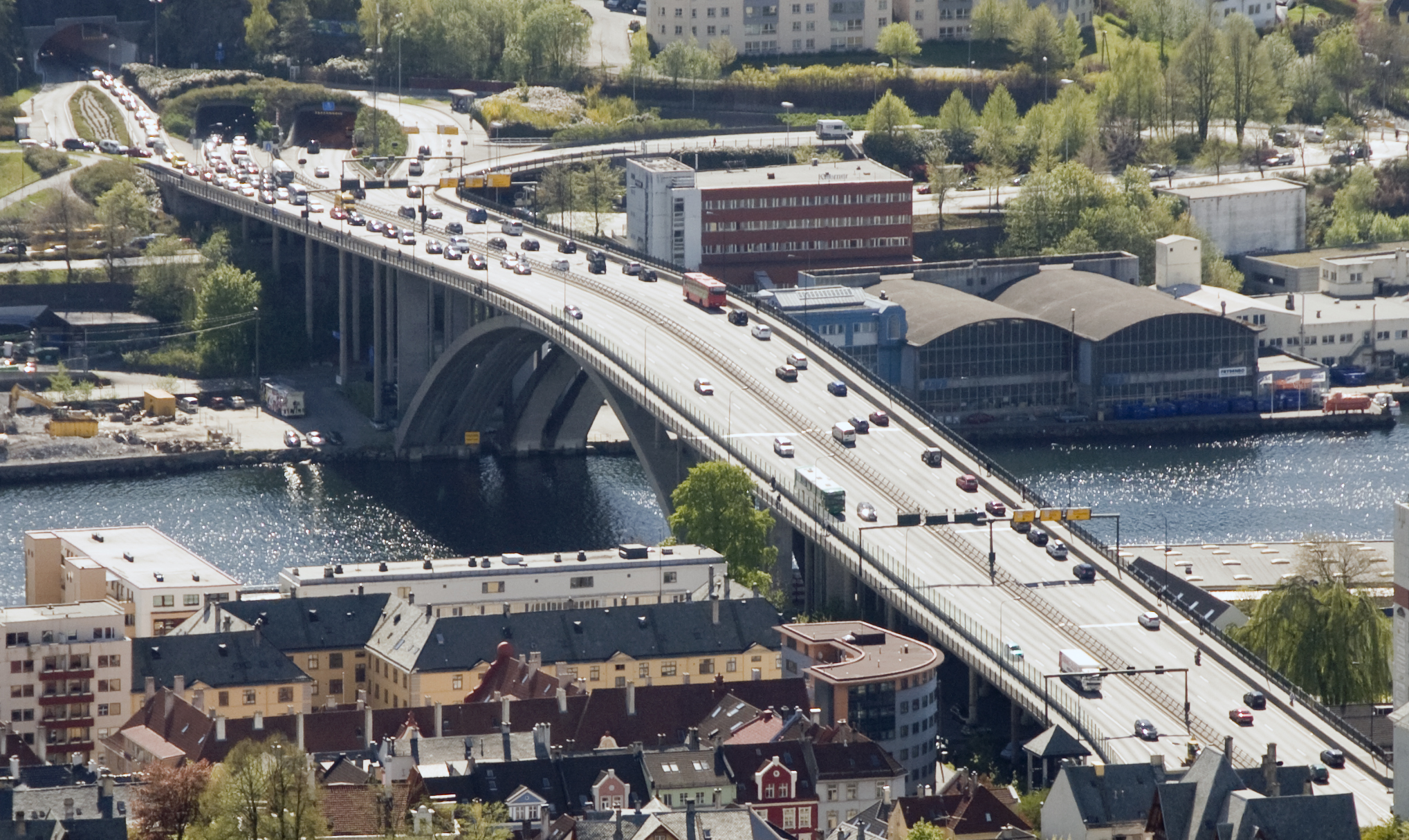
- Puddefjord Bridge
- Coordinates: 60.3841°N 5.3171°E
- Carries: Six lanes on Norwegian National Road RV 555; Cyclists; Pedestrians
- Crosses: Puddefjorden
- Locale: Bergen, Norway
- Official name: Puddefjordsbroen

Characteristics
- Design: Arch bridge
- Total length: 461 m (1,512.5 ft)
- Longest span: 150 m (492.1 ft)

History
- Opened: 1956

Location
- Interactive map of Puddefjord Bridge

The Puddefjord Bridge (Norwegian: Puddefjordsbroen) is an arch bridge in Bergen Municipality in Vestland county, Norway. It is located just south of the centre of the city of Bergen.

The reinforced concrete bridge consists of two directly adjacent, near-identical bridges, the first of which was built in 1956 and the second in 1999. Norwegian National Road RV 555 crosses Puddefjord bridge over Damsgårdssundet into the tunnels Løvstakken Tunnel (Løvstakktunnelen) to Fyllingsdalen and Damsgård Tunnel (Damsgårdstunnelen) to Laksevåg.

The bridge carries six lanes of motor vehicles and two cycle/footpaths across the Puddefjorden in central Bergen, between Møhlenpris in the city centre and Gyldenpris in Årstad borough. Although it does not have official motorway status, it is an important part of the city's motorway network, linking the westbound motorway, Sotraveien, to European route E39.

The bridge was important in the development of the valley of Fyllingsdalen, which was annexed by Bergen in 1955. It also served as a more convenient road to the city centre for the residents of Laksevåg, who prior to its construction had to drive through Danmarksplass or take the ferry across the Puddefjorden.

As of 2012, the bridge carried a daily average traffic of 56,098 vehicles.

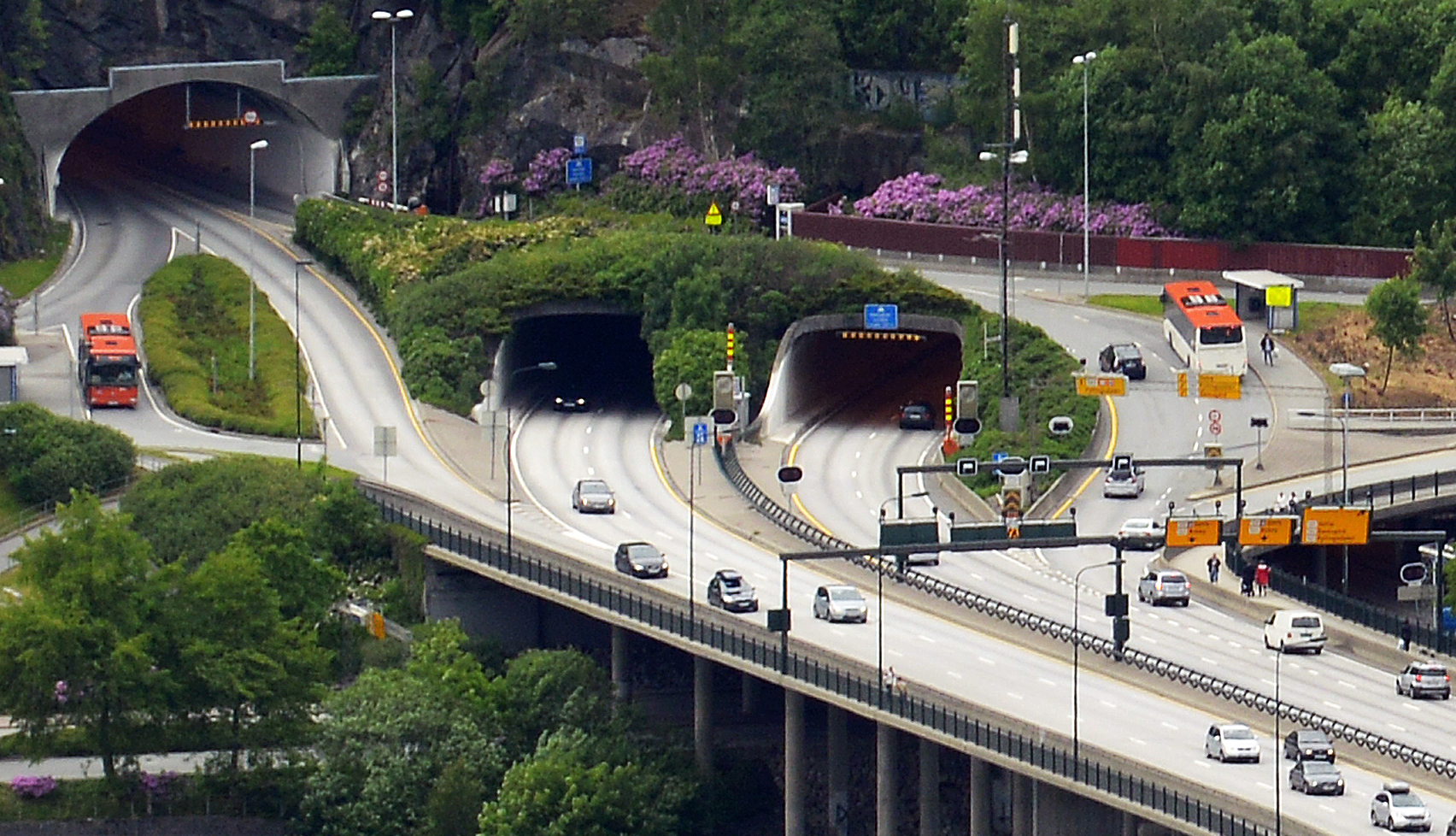
Løvstakken Tunnel and Damsgård Tunnel

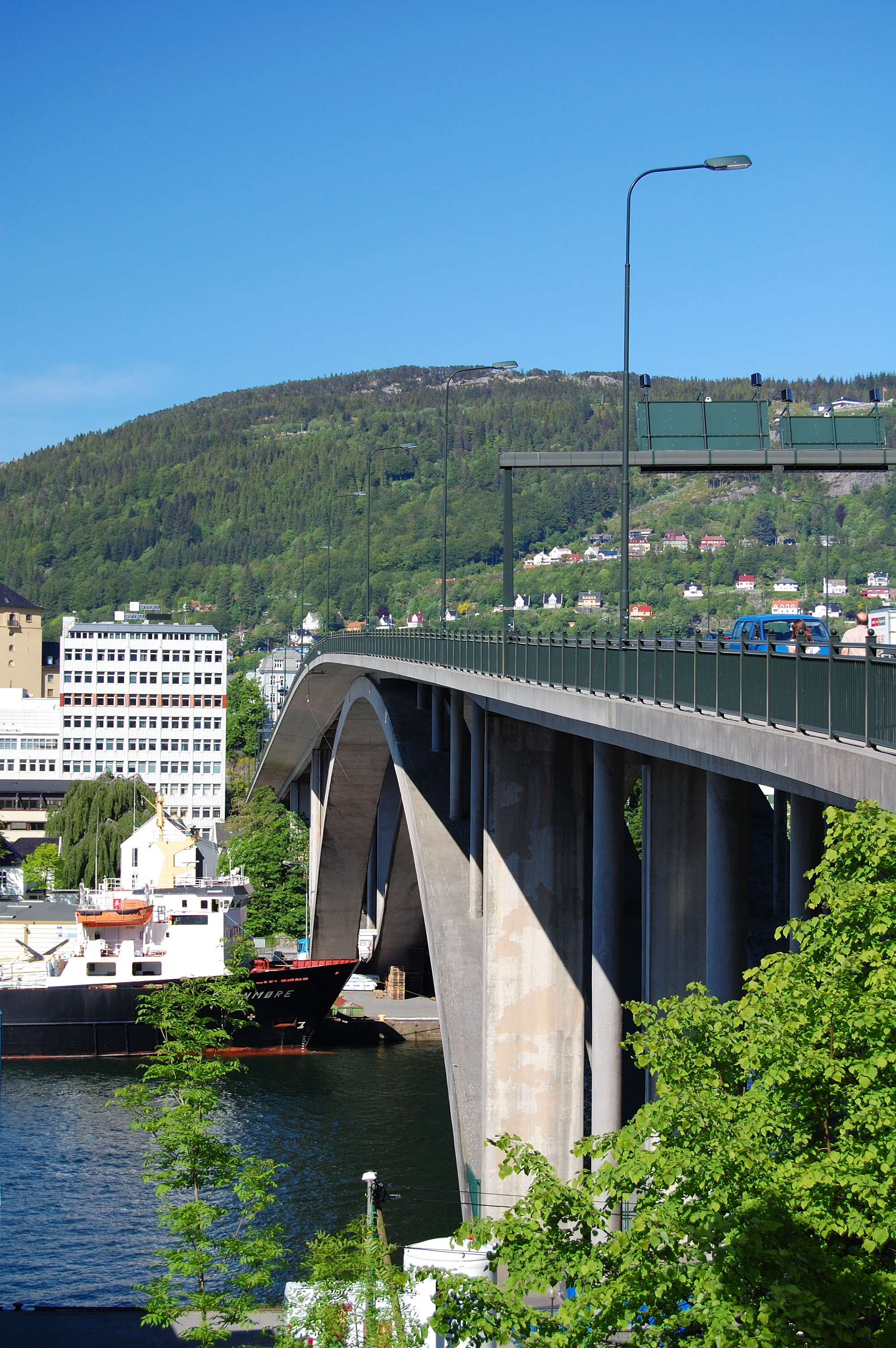
Puddefjord Bridge
