= Bønestoppen =

Neighborhood in Bergen, Norway

Coordinates: 60.33675°N 5.300173°E

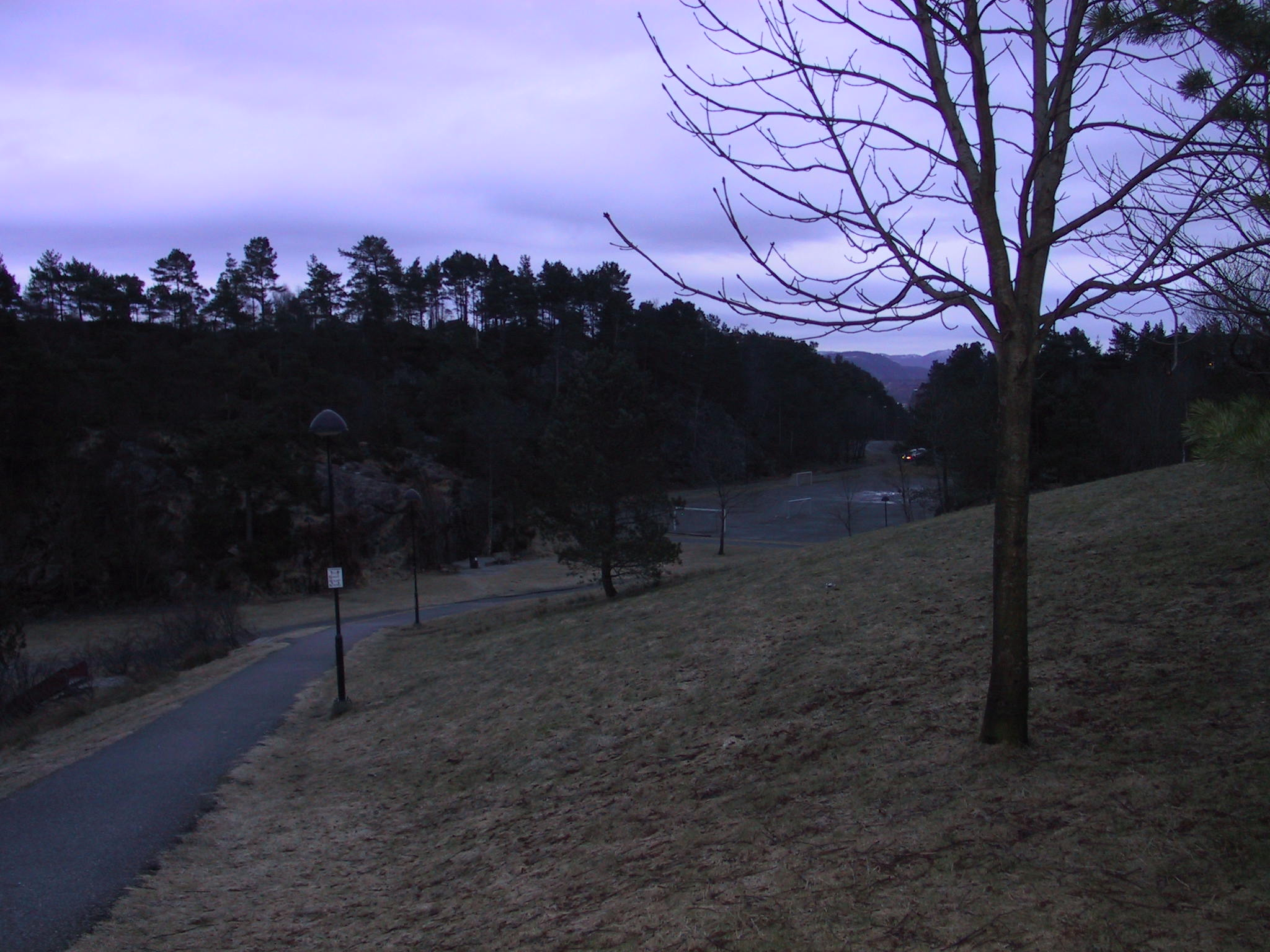
The entrance of the public park at Bønestoppen

Bønestoppen is a neighbourhood in the city of Bergen, Norway. It is located on the northern shore of the lake Nordåsvannet in the city borough of Fyllingsdalen. The Bønes Church is located here.

== History ==
The word "Bønes" comes from the word "Bæjarnes", which means "bosted" or "home", hence Bønestoppen means "bostedstoppen", literally "the top of the home". Bønestoppen has historically been part of Bønes farm, whose history goes back to the early 16th century, although the geography of the steep and forested Bønestoppen made it unsuitable for farming. Most of the housing developments in Bønestoppen date to the early 1990s, having been built following the construction of a new road connecting Bønes and Fyllingsdalen. Formerly having been part of Løvstakken borough, it became part of Fyllingsdalen borough after the reform of 2000.
