= Bergensdalen =

Valley in Vestland, Norway

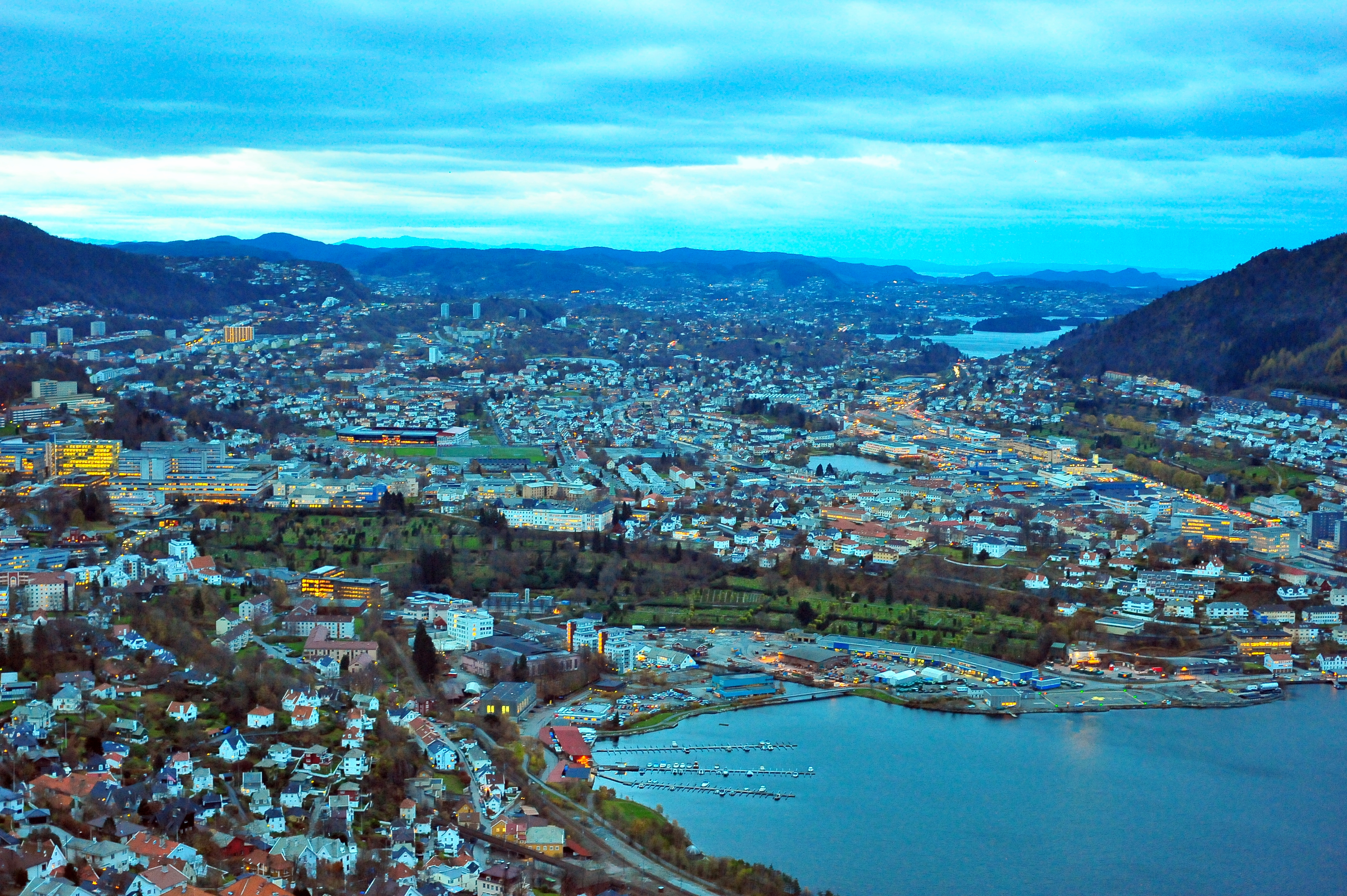
- Length: 10 kilometres (6.2 mi) North-South

Geography
- Location: Vestland, Norway
- Coordinates: 60.3622°N 5.3540°E

Location
- Interactive map of Bergensdalen

Bergensdalen is a valley in Bergen Municipality in Vestland county, Norway. It is surrounded by the several mountains including Ulriken and Landås on the east and Løvstakken and Gullsteinen on the west. The valley stretches about 10 kilometres (6.2 mi) from the city centre of Bergen including all of the borough of Årstad and parts of the boroughs of Fana and Bergenhus.

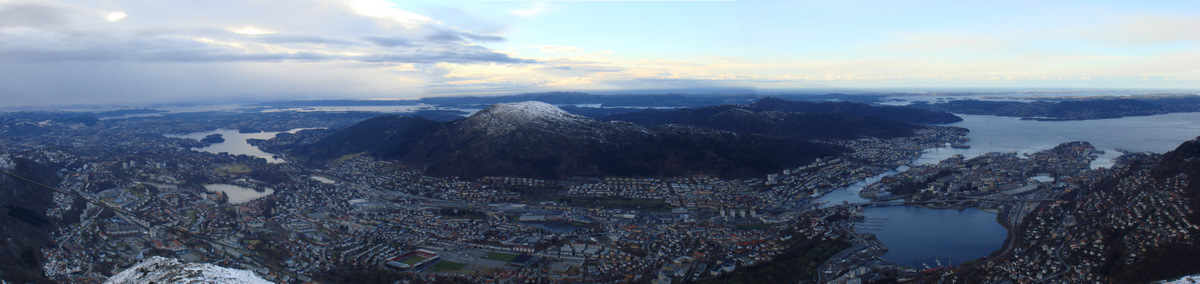
Panorama over Bergensdalen from the mountain of Ulriken.
