= Urdi House =

Manor house in Bergen, Norway

Coordinates: 60.3801°N 5.3213°E

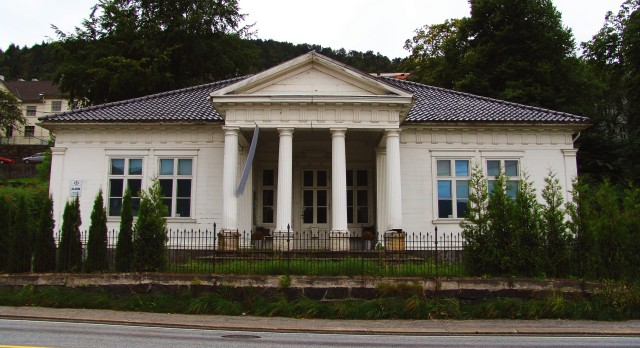
The Urdi House seen from the road

The Urdi House (Norwegian: Urdihuset or simply Urdi) is a manor house in the Gyldenpris neighborhood just outside downtown Bergen, Norway. It is located at Michael Krohn Street (Michael Krohns gate) no. 62. The house is a prime example of late Empire style architecture. The architect that designed the house is uncertain, but it has been attributed to the town surveyor Ole Peter Riis Høegh, who was active in the town between 1834 and 1848. The Urdi House received protected status in 1927.

== Building ==
The Urdi House measures 250 square meters (2,700 sq ft) and consists of a single story covered by a double hip roof. The front side, which faces to the northeast, features a portico with a triangular pediment supported by four columns with Doric capitals. The part of the wall below this projecting roof is set back relative to the rest of the northeast wall, forming a large area under the gable offering a place to sit that is partially protected from the weather with views of the city and the eastern mountains around Bergen. The recessed wall also creates a shaded area that contrasts with the columns.

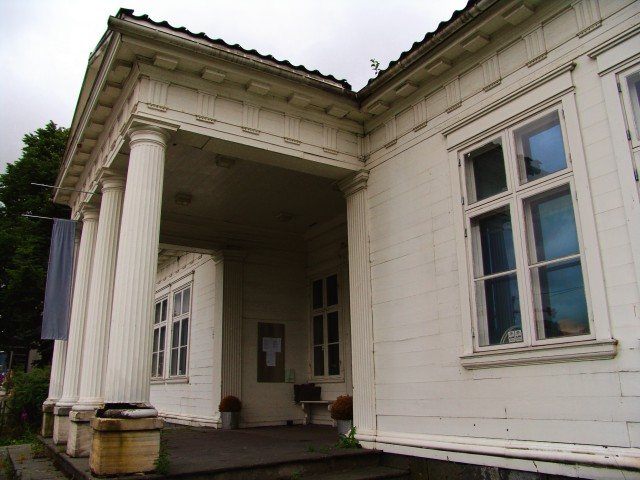
The Urdi House seen from the side

Along the recessed wall beneath the gable is a door leading into the "garden room" (havestue). This name comes from the area in front of the house, which is considered the house's yard or garden, and so the door leading to it is also known as the "garden door" (havedør), and not the main entrance door (hovedinngangsdør). An additional room flanks each side of the garden room, and these three rooms comprise the front of the Urdi House and about half of its area.

The back half of the building contains a hallway (with the main entrance door in the middle of the house at the rear) and foyer in addition to the kitchen and bedrooms. The bedrooms are very small compared to the front rooms, which corresponds to the house's intended main function as a place to display prestige.

== History ==
The house received its name in 1895, when it was purchased by the artists Olav Rusti and his German-born wife Frida Hoeck Rusti. The property was called Uren at that time, but Olav, who was active in the Westerners' Association (Vestmannalaget), Norway's oldest language association, changed the name to Urdi. Olav died in 1920 and Frida moved out during the Second World War because of the property's proximity to the Norwegian naval base. In 1956, Frida Rusti sold the building for a nominal fee to the Artists' Association (Kunstnersamfundet) and Visual Artists Union (Bildende Kunstneres Forening) in Bergen. In 1991 the building was purchased by the Bergen Parapsychological Union.

While it was owned by the Rustis, the house was used as a meeting place by the town's musicians and artists. In 1896, the building was the venue of the first Norwegian national folk music and dance competition (Landskappleiken) featuring Hardanger fiddle, which was attended by Edvard Grieg.

In modern times, the distinctive location of the Urdi House has significantly diminished: the area was originally rural and isolated, but is now dominated by the road built just in front of the building in 1915, and the area has also been built up with newer residential construction much taller than the one-story Urdi House. In addition, the development of small industries below Michael Krohn Street, along Pudde Fjord, has changed the area's character.

The house's current owner, Janne Gullaksen, has restored the Urdi House's connection to art, using it as a studio and gallery. She also offers training in painting at the house and sells art materials. In addition, a small cafe has been set up in the building.
