= Damsgårdsfjellet =

Mountain in Bergen, Norway

Highest point
- Elevation: 345 m (1,132 ft)
- Prominence: 25 m (82 ft)
- Parent peak: Olsokfjellet
- Isolation: 0.33 km (0.21 mi)
- Coordinates: 60°22′30″N 5°17′34″E

Geography
- Location: Vestland, Norway
- Topo map: 1115 I Bergen

Climbing
- Easiest route: Hiking

Damsgårdsfjellet is a mountain in Bergen Municipality in Vestland county, Norway. It is one of the seven mountains surrounding the city center of Bergen. The 284-metre (932 ft) tall mountain lies west of Melkeplassen and south of Laksevåg. The Damsgård Tunnel, one of the main highways into the centre of Bergen, runs through the mountain.

== See also ==
- List of mountains of Norway
