= Fyllingsdalen =

Borough of Bergen, Norway

Fyllingsdalen bydel
- Borough
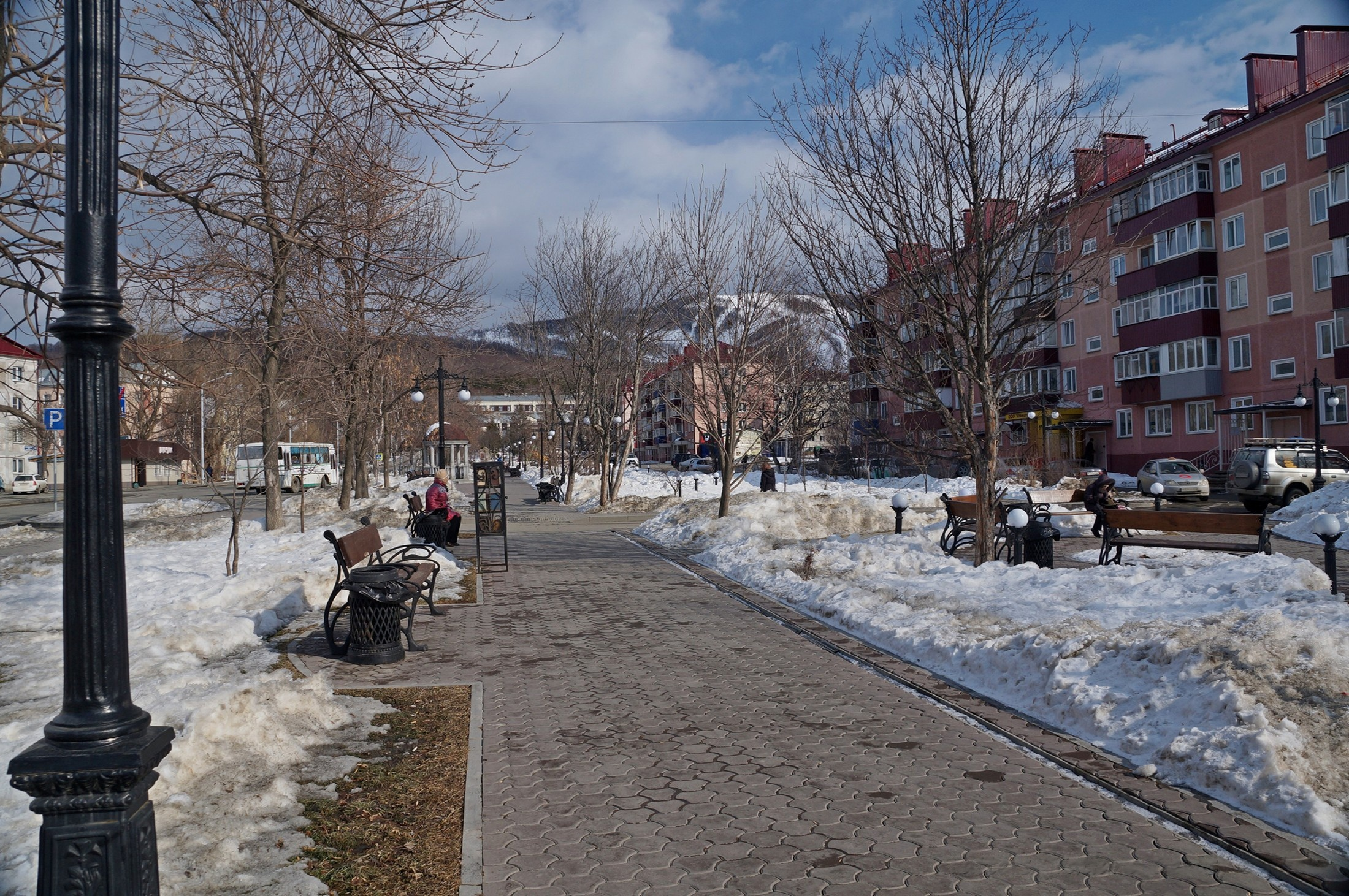
- Typical apartment buildings and terraced houses in Fyllingsdalen

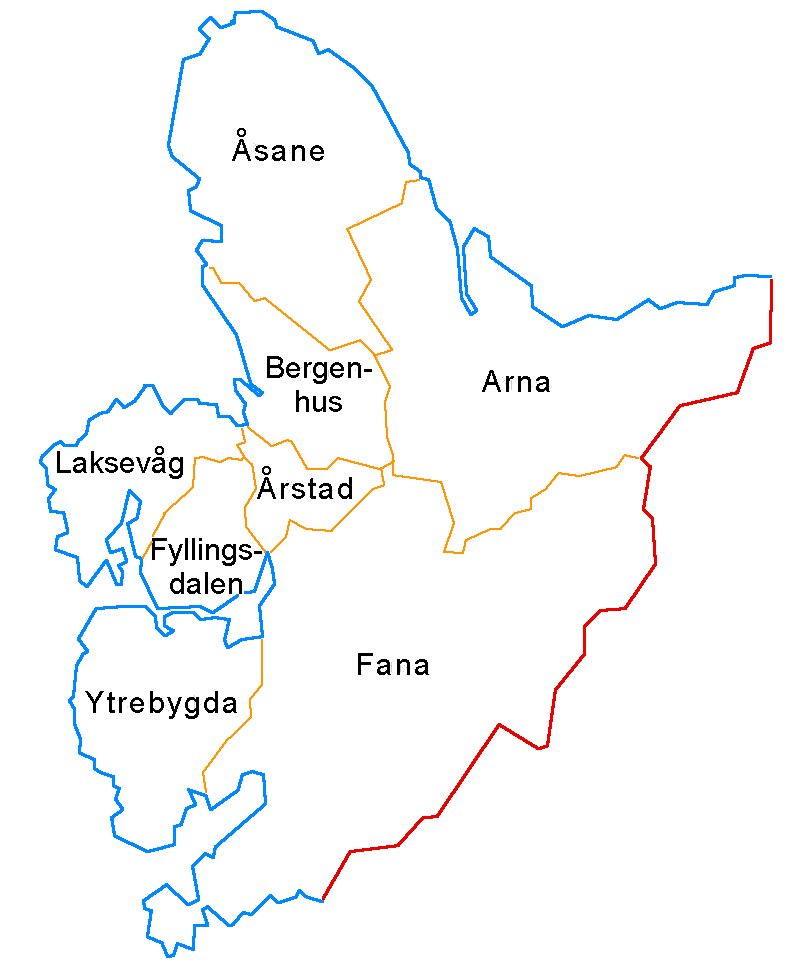
- Map of the 8 boroughs of Bergen
- Coordinates: 60°20′55″N 05°17′20″E
- Country: Norway
- Region: Western Norway
- County: Vestland
- District: Midhordland
- City: Bergen

Area
  - Total: 17.74 km^{2} (6.85 sq mi)
  - Rank: 7th
- 4% of total

Population (2014)
  - Total: 29 650
  - Rank: 6th
  - Density: 1.6/km^{2} (4.2/sq mi)
- 10.7% of total
- Time zone: UTC+01:00 (CET)
  - Summer (DST): UTC+02:00 (CEST)
- ISO 3166 code: NO-120104

Fyllingsdalen (Urban East Norwegian: [ˈfʏ̂lːɪŋsˌdɑːɫn̩]) is a borough of the city of Bergen in Vestland county, Norway. The borough is located southwest of the city centre in the Fyllingsdalen valley, west of the mountain Løvstakken. The neighbourhoods of Fyllingsdalen mainly consist of fairly large apartment buildings with little industry or commerce.

The valley's name comes from the farm name "Fyllingen" (from Old Norse: 'fylingr', related to Old Norse 'fæla' - hide/hidden) and "dale" (from Old Norse: 'dalr' - valley) and is attested in 1437 as "Fylingir" . (see also Sandnes/Stemshaug: Norsk Stadnamnleksikon, Samlaget, Oslo 1990). See Fylingdales.

== History ==
In 1955, Bergen Municipality, lacking land to build and expand on, annexed the valley, which at the time had a population of approximately 1,600. Prior to that time, Fyllingsdalen had belonged to the old Fana Municipality, which was later merged into Bergen as well.

The Puddefjord Bridge (opened in 1956) and the Løvstakken Tunnel (opened in 1968) contributed greatly to the growth of the borough by providing a highway from the valley directly into the centre of the city of Bergen.

Fyllingsdalen was constructed as a modern commuter town, but saw some commercial activity develop in the late 20th century. The main service centre for the borough is the shopping centre Oasen, opened in 1971.

== Culture and education ==
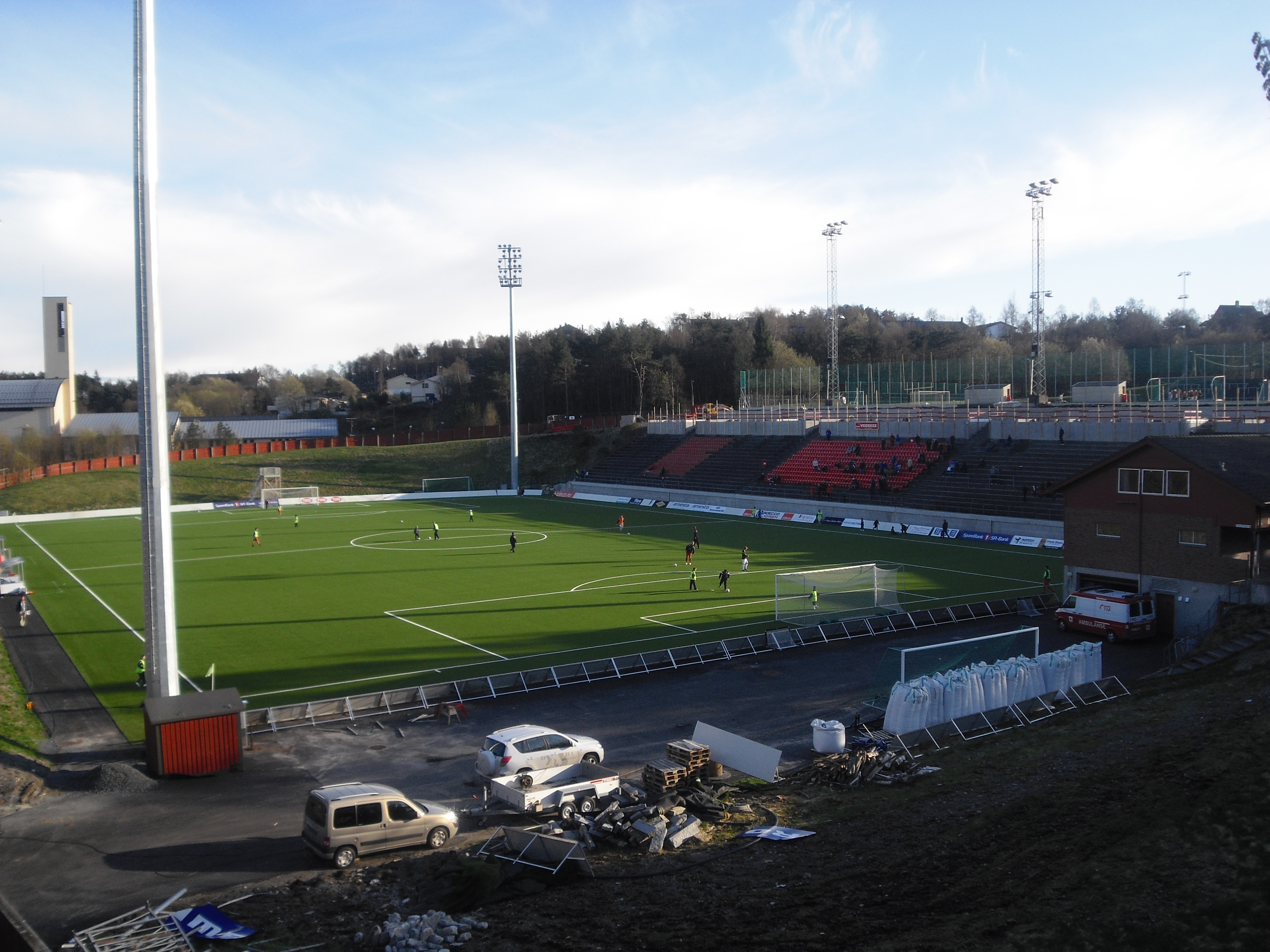
Varden Amfi

Fyllingsdalen contains three churches, several elementary schools and lower secondary schools (including Varden skole), one upper secondary school and two nursing homes, as well as police stations, surgeries, pharmacies, and post offices.

Sports arenas include Varden Amfi.

== Transportation ==
The Knappe Tunnel runs from Dolviken (in Ytrebygda borough to the south) to Fyllingsdalen, and on to Laksevåg borough in the north.

== Villages and neighborhoods ==
The villages and neighborhoods in the borough include: Bønestoppen, Nedre Fyllingen, Sælen, and Traudalen.

== Famous people ==
- Gabrielle Leithaug (singer)
- Cecilie Leganger (handball player)
