= Student Welfare Organisation in Bergen =

Norwegian student welfare organisation

- Type: Student welfare organisation
- Industry: Student welfare
- Founded: 1948
- Headquarters: Bergen, Norway
- Area served: Bergen, Norway
- Revenue: ▲NOK 236.4 million (2006)
- Operating income: NOK 1.1 million (2006)
- Net income: NOK million (2006)
- Number of employees: 247 (2007)
- Subsidiaries: Studia
- Website: www.sib.no

The Student Welfare Organisation in Bergen (Norwegian: Studensamskipnaden i Bergen) or SiB was a Norwegian student welfare organisation in Bergen, Norway and was responsible for the welfare of about 30,000 students in 2015. It covered the following institutions:

- University of Bergen (UiB)
- Norwegian School of Economics and Business Administration (NHH)
- Bergen University College (HiB)
- Bergen National Academy of the Arts
- Diakonissehjemmet University College
- Norwegian School of Information Technology
- Bergen School of Architecture
- Norwegian Teacher Academy
- Betanien Diakonal University College
- NLA Teacher College

SiB's services included housing, training centres, 300 kindergarten places, 20 cafés, Studia book stores, psychologists, advisors, career centre, health centre and economic support arrangements. The housing was concentrated in about 20 buildings around Bergen, both in the city centre/campus areas as well as other places including Fantoft and at Hatleberg beside NHH. SiB was one of the largest real estate owners in Western Norway, accommodating more than 3300 students, though SiB was criticized in the Norwegian press for only covering 12% of student housing needs, compared to 20% in Oslo and Trondheim.

SiB was led by a board of ten members: five, including the chairman, from the students, three from the employees and two from the universities and colleges. One of the latter was from UiB while the other was from NHH or HiB, alternatingly.

The student representatives on the board were elected by the Student Welfare Parliament in Bergen.

SiB was merged with Studentsamskipnaden i Sogn og Fjordane and Studentsamskipnaden Stord/Haugesund to form Studentsamskipnaden på Vestlandet.
