= Bønes Church =

Church in Vestland, Norway

- Bønes kirke
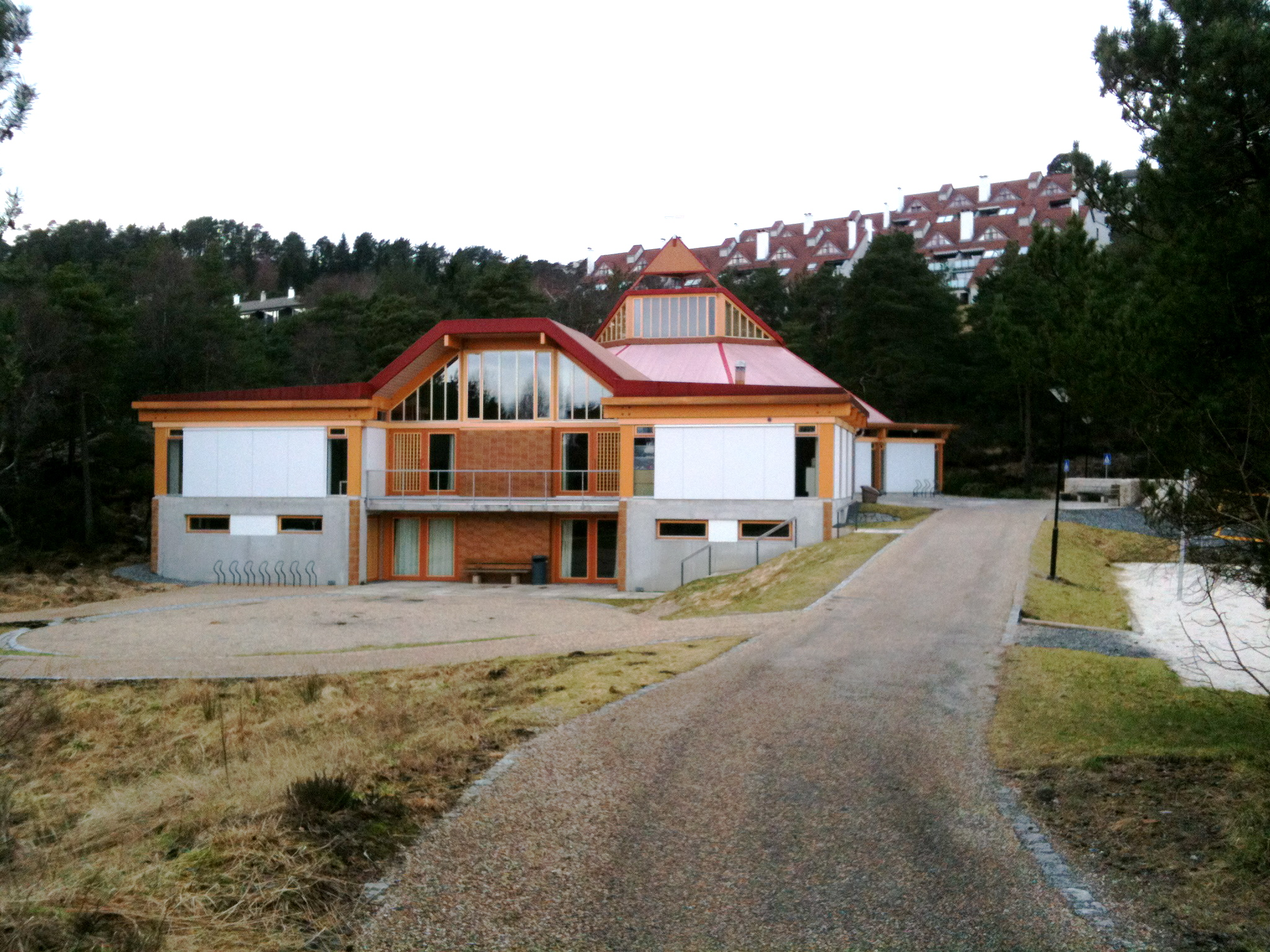
- View of the church
- Bønes Church
- 60°19′48″N 5°18′06″E
- Location: Bergen Municipality, Vestland
- Country: Norway
- Denomination: Church of Norway
- Churchmanship: Evangelical Lutheran

History
- Status: Parish church
- Founded: 1997
- Consecrated: 7 Dec 1997
- Events: Expansion in 2009

Architecture
- Functional status: Active
- Architect: Helge Hjertholm
- Architectural type: Fan-shaped
- Completed: 1997 (29 years ago)

Specifications
- Capacity: 300
- Materials: Wood

Administration
- Diocese: Bjørgvin bispedømme
- Deanery: Bergensdalen prosti
- Parish: Bønes
- Norwegian Cultural Heritage Site
- Type: Church
- Status: Not protected
- ID: 249266

Bønes Church (Norwegian: Bønes kirke) is a parish church of the Church of Norway in Bergen Municipality in Vestland county, Norway. It is located in the Bønestoppen neighborhood in the city of Bergen. It is the church for the Bønes parish which is part of the Bergensdalen prosti (deanery) in the Diocese of Bjørgvin. The white, wooden church was built in a fan-shaped style in 1997 using designs by the architect Helge Hjertholm. The church seats about 300 people.

== History ==
The church was built in 1997 and consecrated on 7 December 1997. From 1997 until 2002, the church was an annex to the main Storetveit Church, but since 2002 it has been a separate parish. The church was designed to be built in two stages as the church grew in membership. The first stage was completed in 1997 and in 2009, a large addition was built onto the church, which completed the second stage. The new addition was consecrated on 6 December 2009.

== Media gallery ==
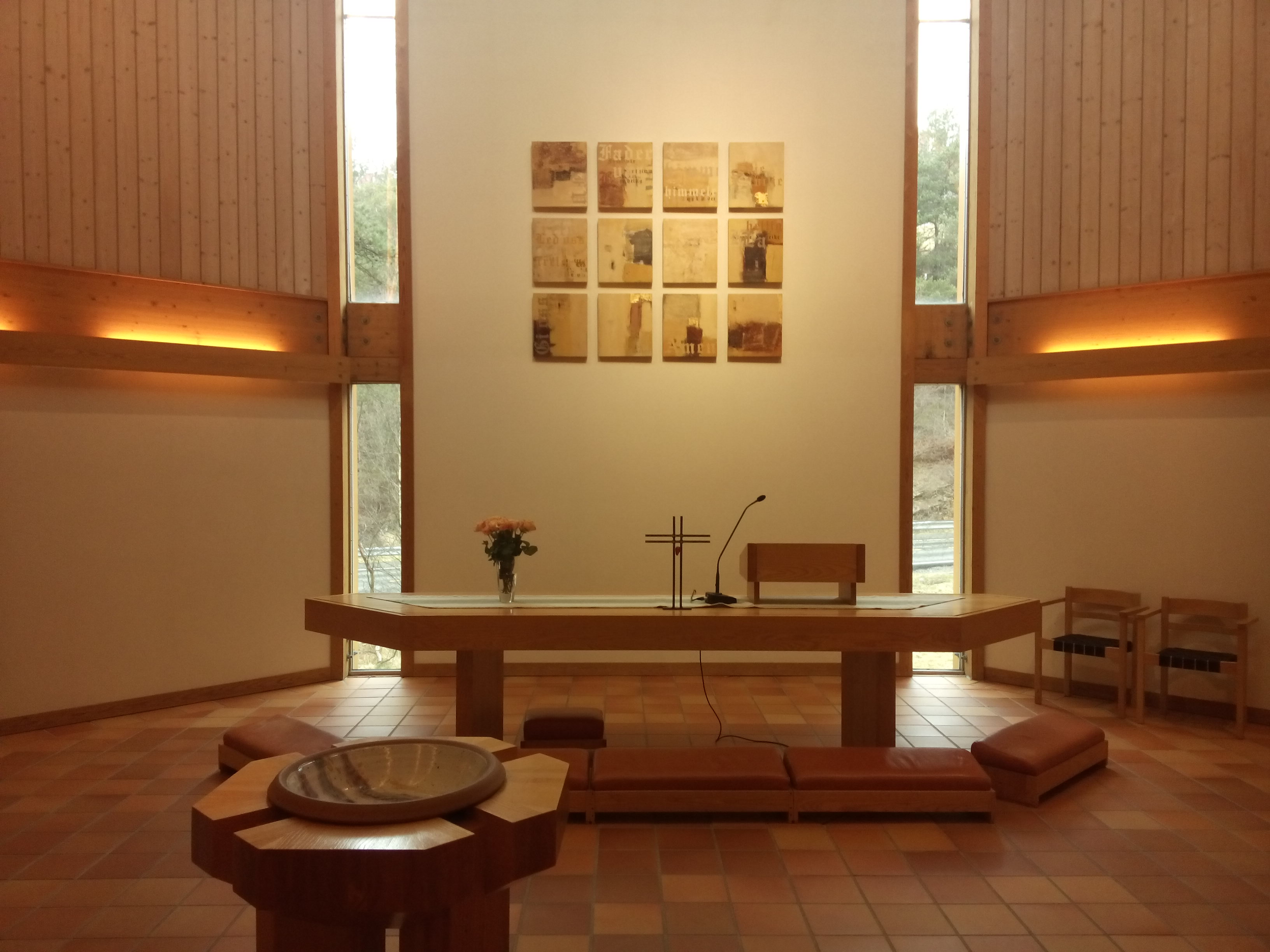

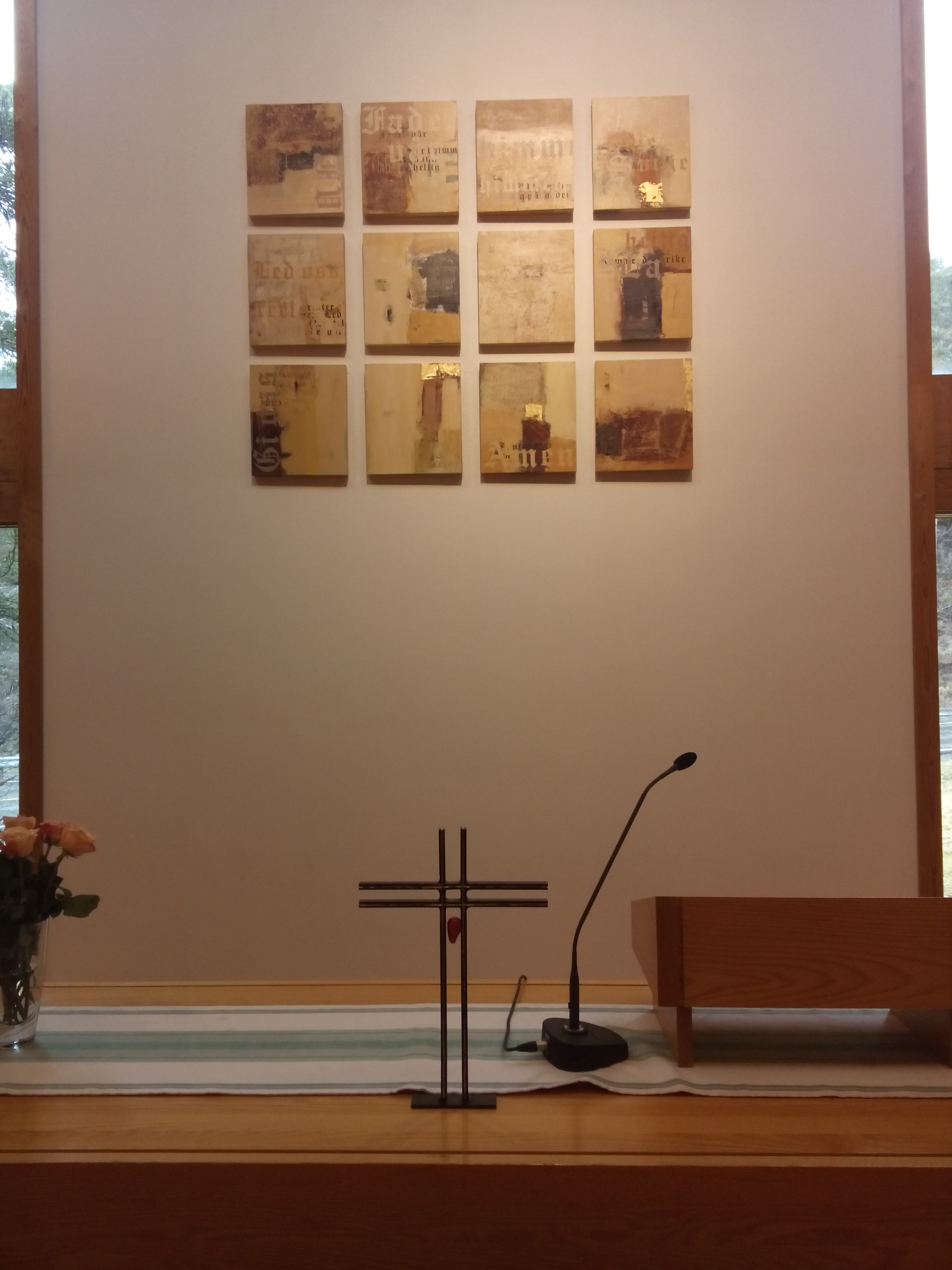

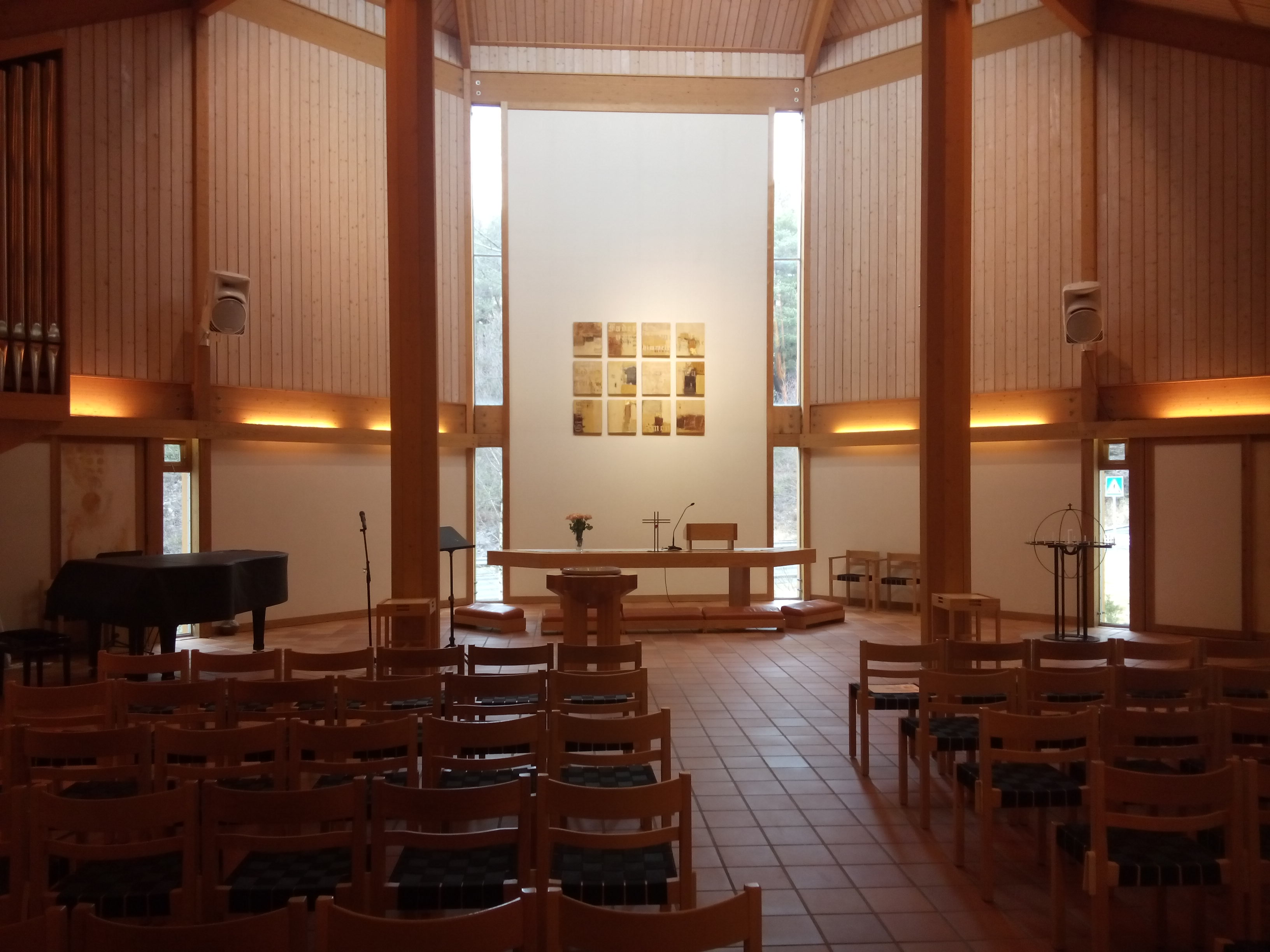

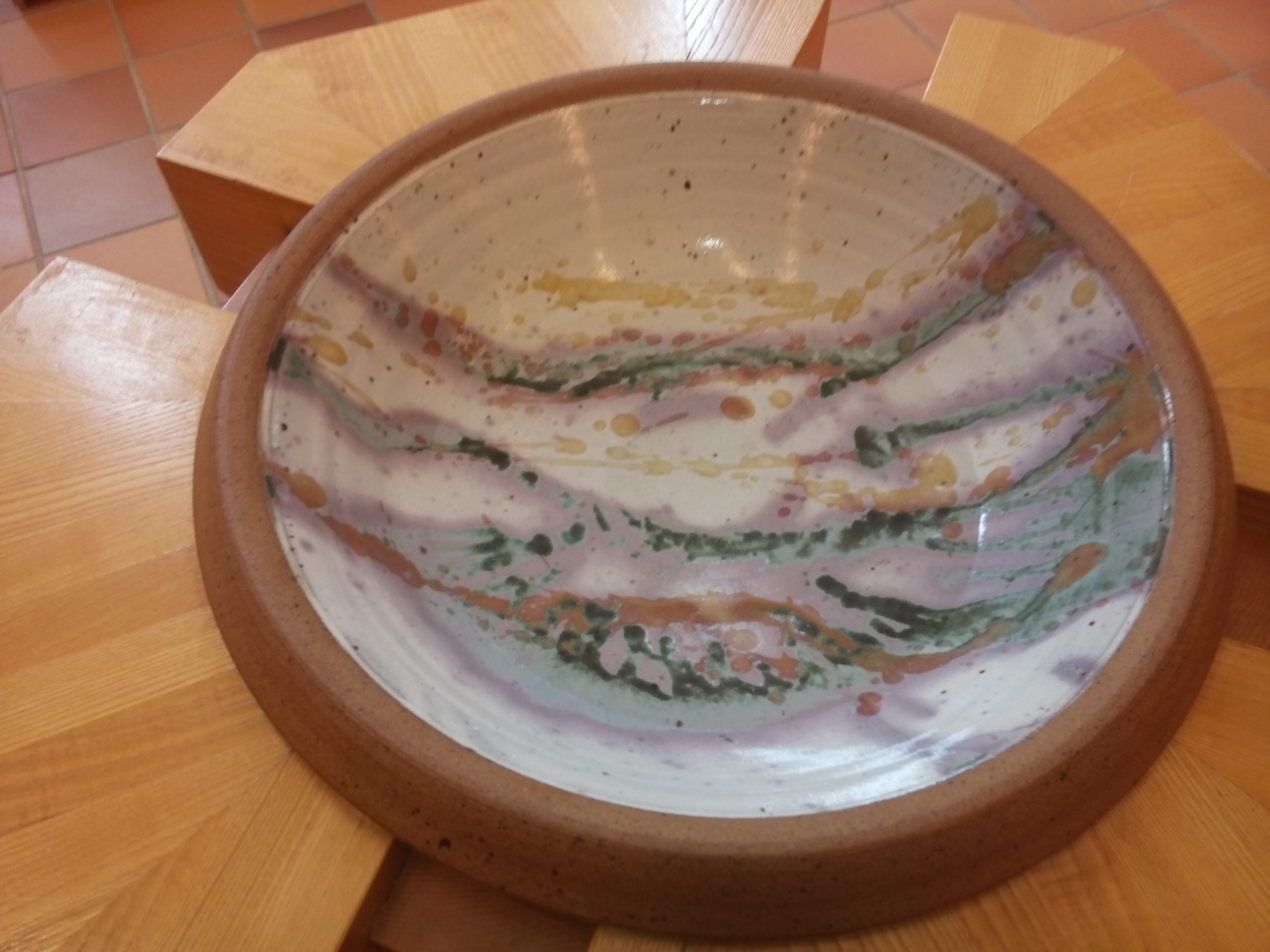

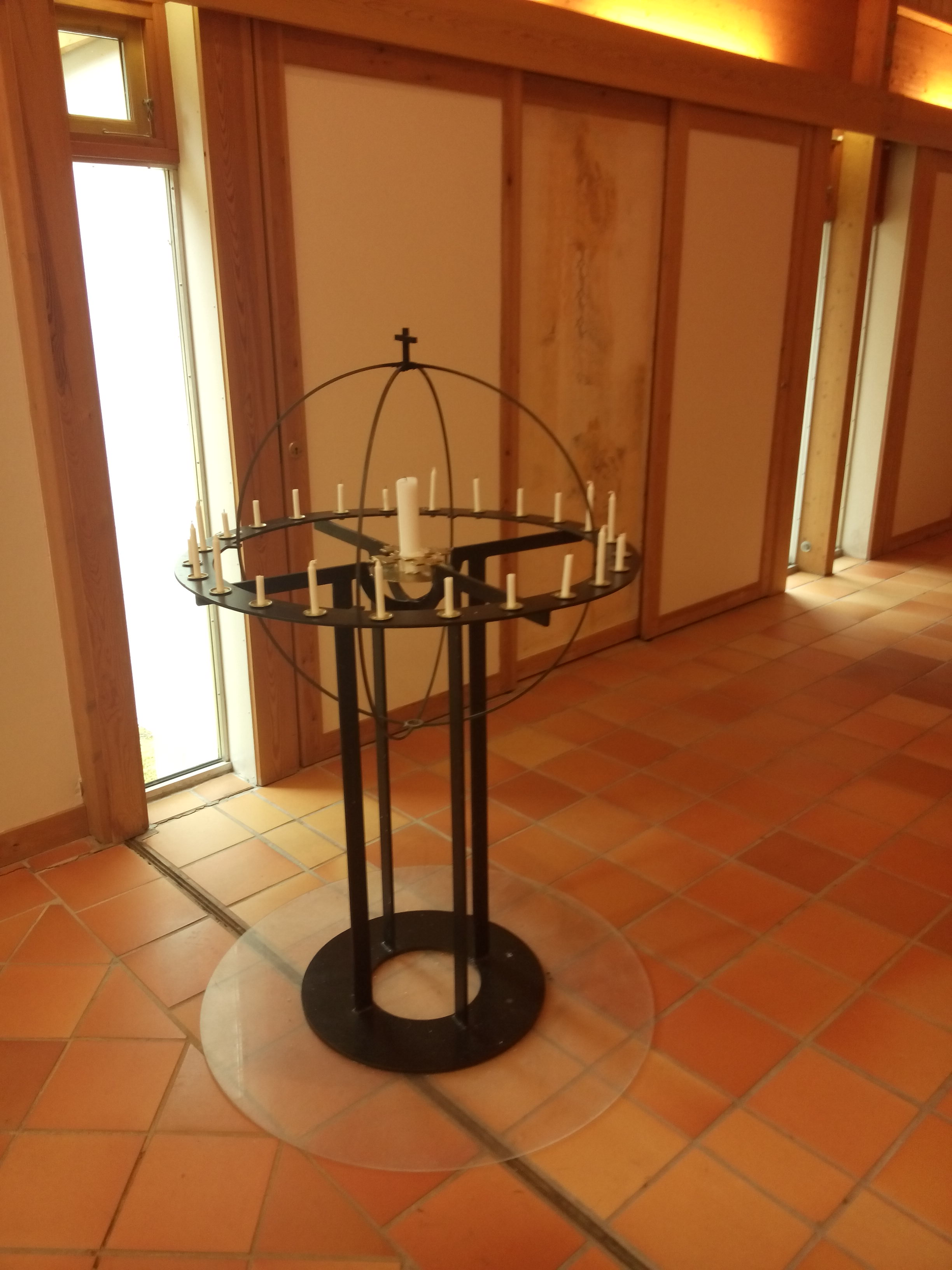

== See also ==
- List of churches in Bjørgvin
