= Puddefjorden =

Bay in Bergen, Norway

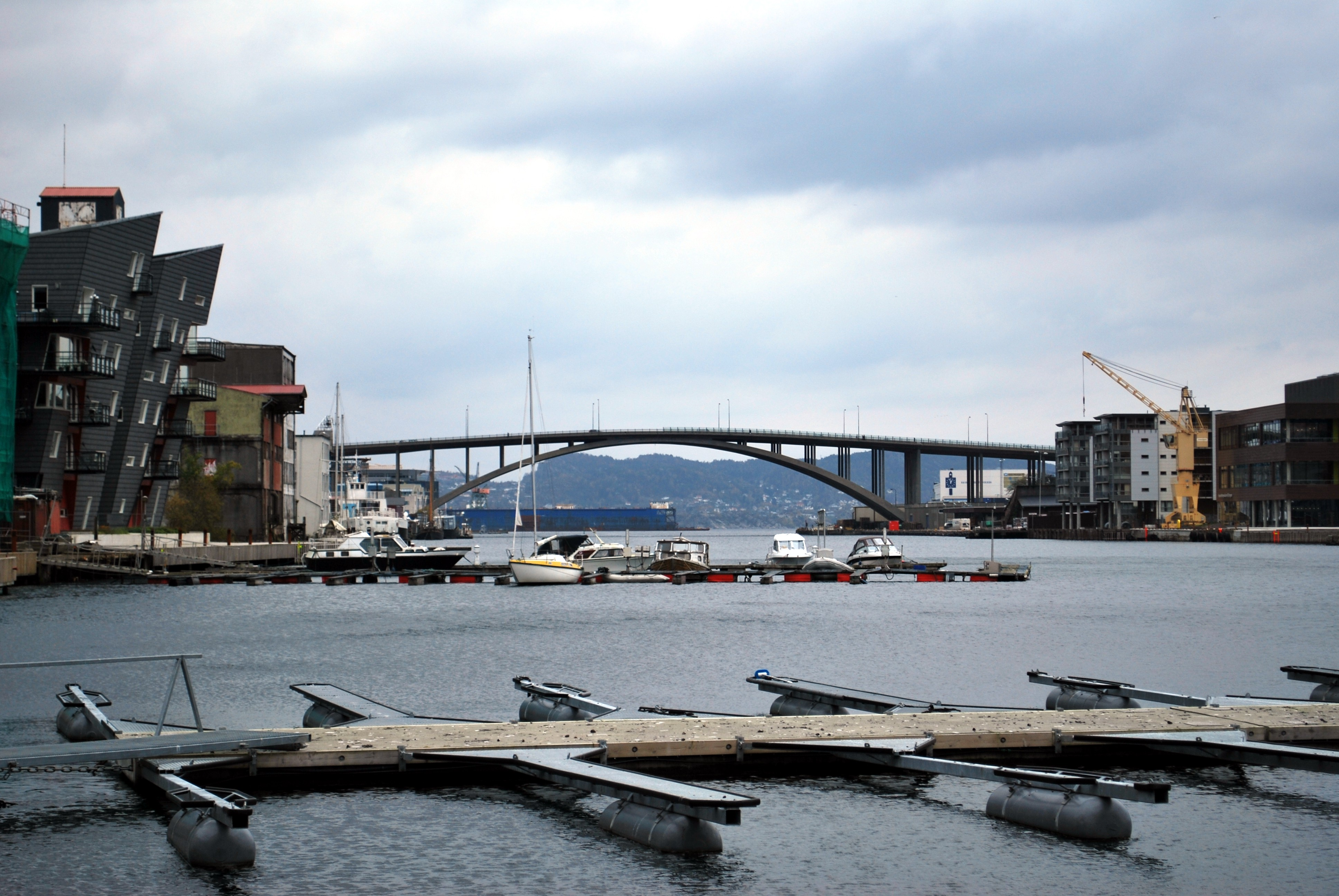
- View of the bay
- Interactive map of Puddefjorden
- Location: Vestland county, Norway
- Coordinates: 60.39209°N 5.2982°E
- Type: Bay
- Basin countries: Norway
- Max. length: 3.5 kilometres (2.2 mi)
- Settlements: Bergen

Puddefjorden (sometimes anglicized as Pudde Fjord) is an inlet or bay in the central part of the city of Bergen in Vestland county, Norway. An arm off of the main Byfjorden, the Puddefjorden is 3.5 kilometres (2.2 mi) long and stretches from the tip of the Nordnes peninsula to the Solheimsviken bay at the entrance to the Store Lungegårdsvannet bay. The fjord is 1.2 kilometres (0.75 mi) at its widest, between Nordnes and the inner part of the borough of Laksevåg. The innermost part of the fjord, known as Damsgårdssundet, is much narrower, scarcely 100 metres (330 ft) wide at its narrowest. The fjord is located next to some of Bergen's most important industrial areas, and has played a significant part in the city's development and industrialisation.

== History ==
Despite being situated in the central part of the present-day city of Bergen, the Puddefjorden did not play a major role in the city's early history. The fjord experiences strong currents and has numerous small islets, rendering boat passage dangerous. Furthermore, its innermost parts used to lightly freeze over during winters. Because of that, the nearby Vågen bay was the preferred entrance to the city for nearly all water-craft traffic.

The ice, islets, and strong current caused the kings of Alrekstad (today known as Årstad) to avoid using Puddefjorden. The ice also stopped an invasion attempt by Kristoffer Throndsen in 1536, when Puddefjorden went all the way in to what is now known as Lille Lungegårdsvann.

Puddefjorden was originally not considered a part of the city of Bergen, but rather a nearby area. This view held until the mid-1800s. The fjord's northeastern side belonged to the city, however, and scattered habitations appeared there at the end of the 17th century, later becoming the neighbourhoods of Møhlenpris and Nøstet.

The original Puddefjorden was both longer and broader than it is today, but after extensive industrialisation of the nearby areas in the 19th century, the fjord's form was altered through land reclamation. Formerly, the Puddefjord was wrapped around the city, ending only a few blocks away from Vågen. Following the final filling of the strait between Lille Lungegårdsvannet and Store Lungegårdsvannet in 1926, the fjord now stops in the Store Lungegårdsvannet bay.

Changes to the fjord over the centuries

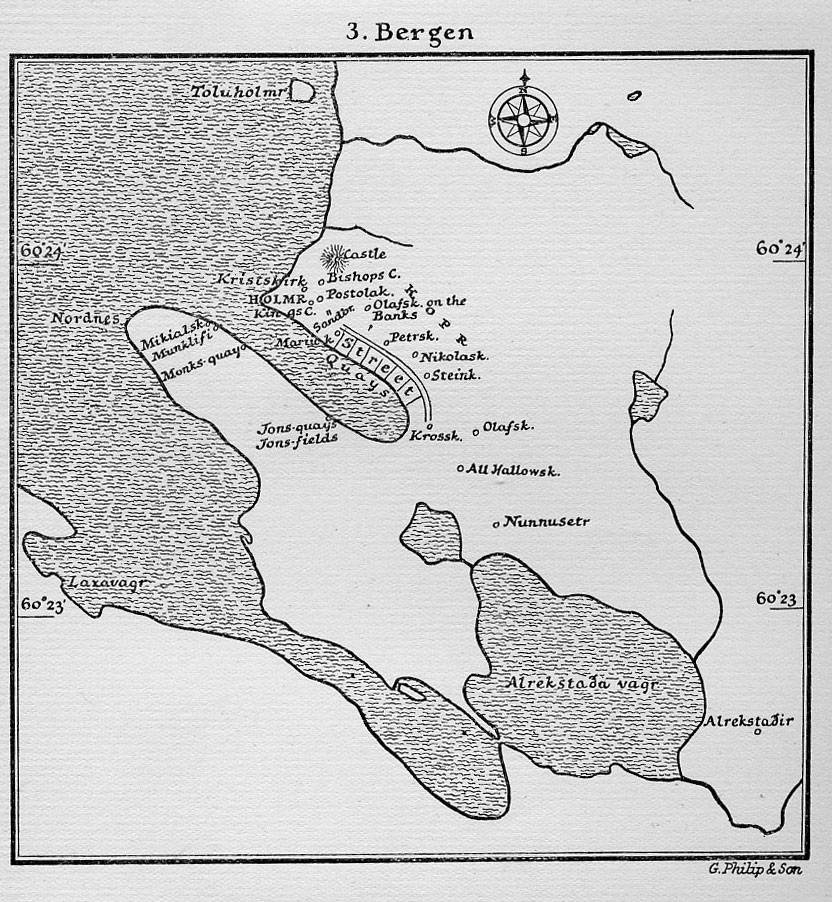
Map from the 13th century

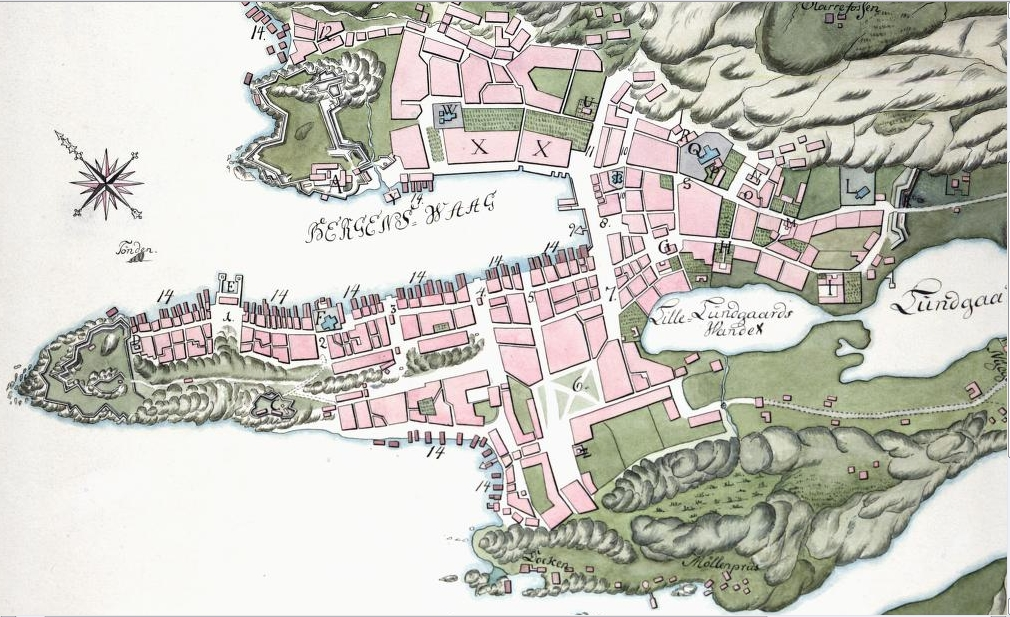
Map from 1768

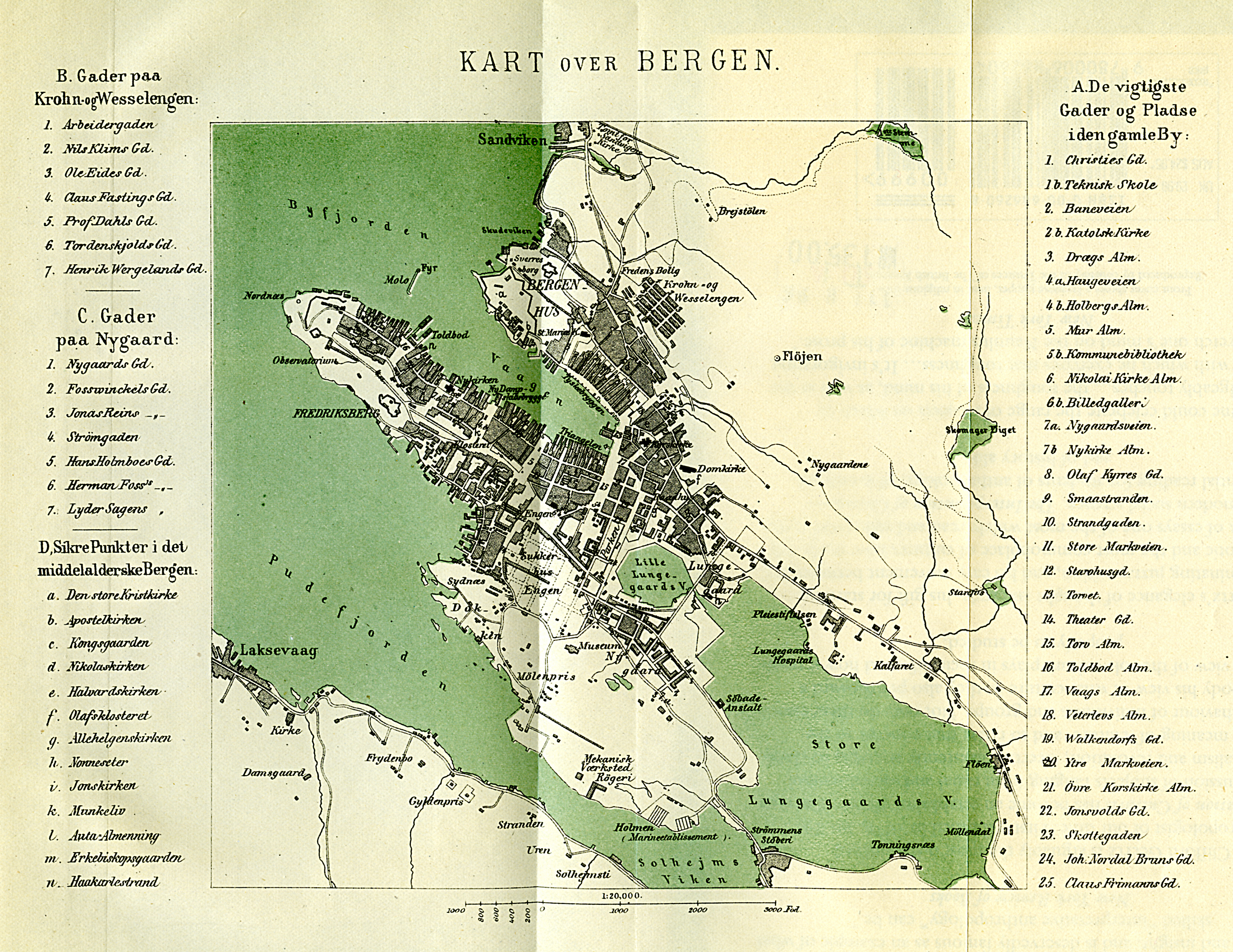
Map from 1877

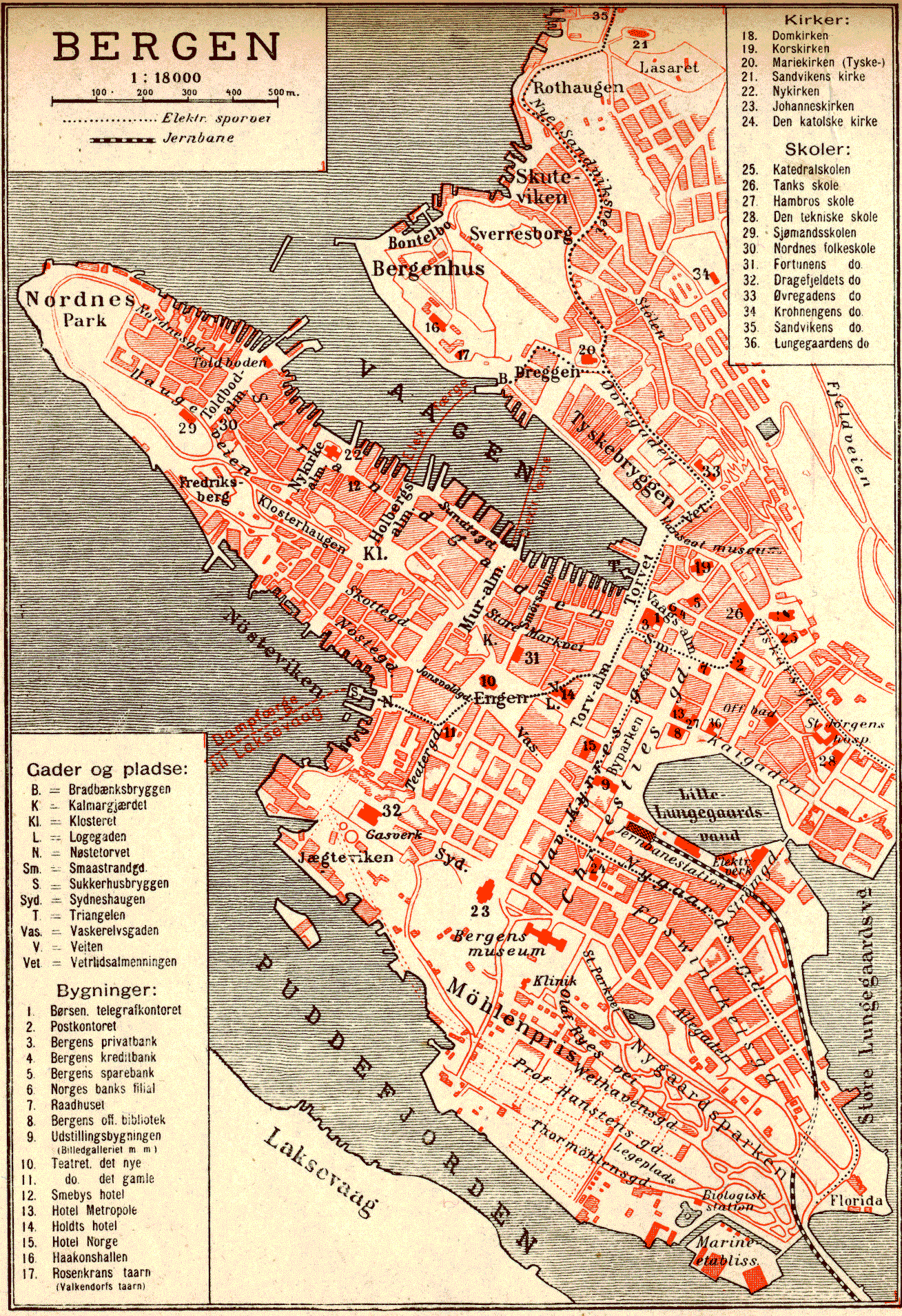
Map from 1907

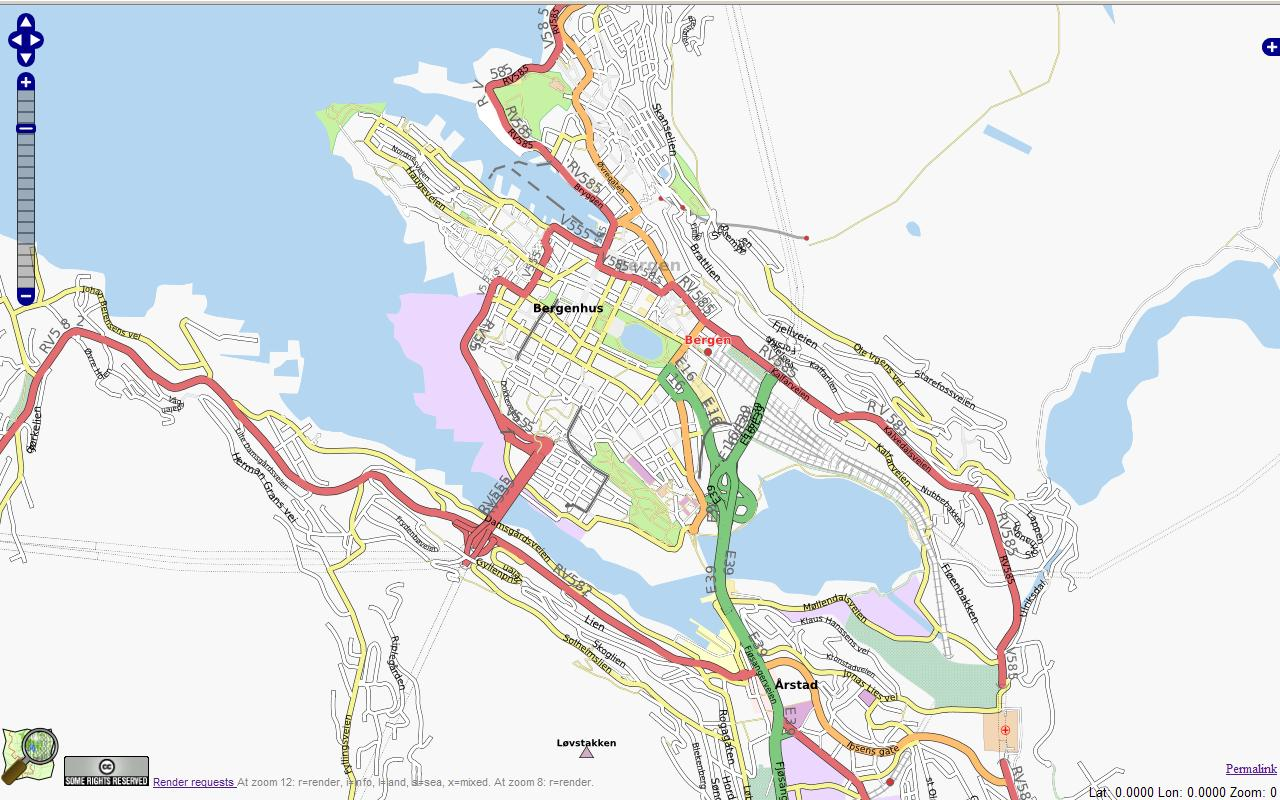
Map from 2008

== Bridges ==
The first bridge across Puddefjorden was the first Nygård Bridge, opened in 1851. Since that time, three additional bridges have been built across the fjord; the New Nygård Bridge (1978), the Second New Nygård Bridge (2008), and the Puddefjord Bridge (1956). The former three cross the entrance to Store Lungegårdsvann, while the fourth spans the fjord between Møhlenpris and Gyldenpris.

== Environment ==
Industry has had an environmental effect on the fjord, and its sediment has become polluted with PCB and mercury. There has never been a thorough record of the poisons released into Puddefjorden, and both smaller businesses and locals have used Store Lungegårdsvann as a disposal area. As a result, Puddefjorden is now divided into five sub-areas and the rinsing process is estimated to cost around 10 million kr.

== See also ==
- List of Norwegian fjords
