= Student welfare organisation =

Student Welfare Organisation (Norwegian: Studentsamskipnad) is a legal entity responsible for the welfare of students of universities, university colleges, scientific universities and other colleges in Norway. The 14 organisations are regulated by the Student Welfare Organisation Act from 1996 and based on compulsory membership of all students attending the associated institutions.

Welfare offers are financed through a student fee, direct subsidies from the Norwegian Ministry of Education and Research as well as from the educational institutions through free or cheap facilities or real estate. The profit from the organisations commercial activities is channeled back to operation and investments in welfare activities. All organisations are led by a board compromising a majority and chairman elected from and by the students as well as representatives from the employees and the educational institutions. The board chooses which services to provide to the students as well as setting the student fee, which typically is around NOK 650 per semester, as of 2024. A voluntary contribution of up to NOK 40 to a student-based international aid organisation is collected alongside the fee. The student welfare organisations must report to the Ministry as well as the Office of the Auditor General of Norway.

Among the responsibilities of the organisations are operations of campus book stores and cafés, of which the organisations have a monopoly to operate on campus. Other services include certain health services, advisory services, kindergartens and housing.

== List of student welfare organisations in Norway ==
- Nord studentsamskipnad (Studentinord)
- Norges arktiske studentsamskipnad
- Studentsamskipnaden i Agder (SiA)
- Studentsamskipnaden i Gjøvik, Ålesund og Trondheim (Sit)
- Studentsamskipnaden i Innlandet (SINN)
- Studentsamskipnaden i Indre Finnmark (SSO)
- Studentsamskipnaden i Molde (SiMolde)
- Studentsamskipnaden i Oslo og Akershus (SiO)
- Studentsamskipnaden i Stavanger (SiS)
- Studentsamskipnaden i Sørøst-Norge (SSN)
- Studentsamskipnaden i Volda (SiVolda)
- Studentsamskipnaden i Østfold (SiØ)
- Studentsamskipnaden i Ås (SiÅs)
- Studentsamskipnaden på Vestlandet (Sammen)

== See also ==
- College auxiliary services
- Hostel
- Ombudsman
- Student association
- YMCA
