= Møhlenpris =

Coordinates: 60°23′05″N 5°19′18″E

- Neighbourhood
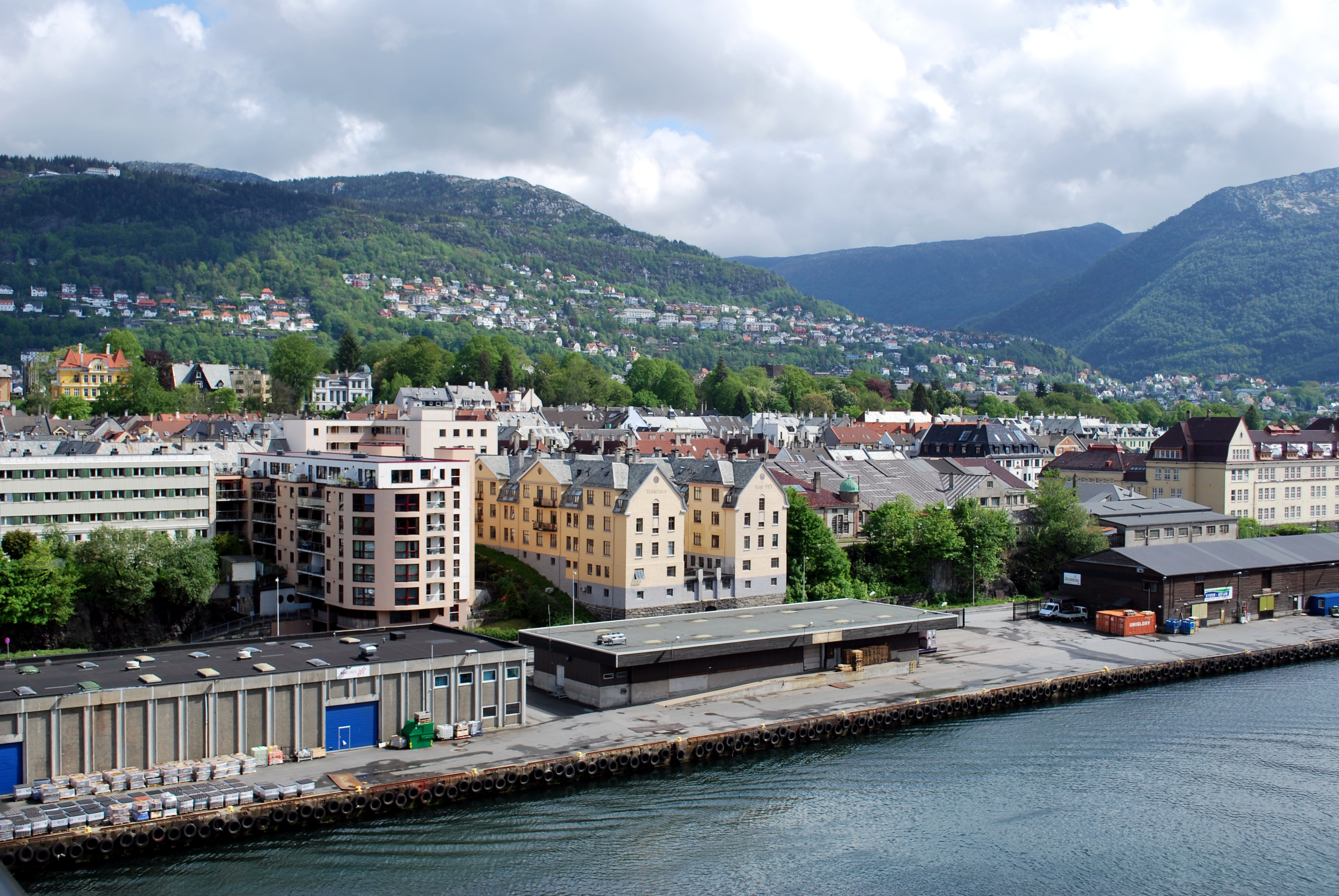
- Møhlenpris
- Nickname: Mølleren
- Interactive map of Møhlenpris
- Country: Norway
- County: Vestland
- District: Midhordland
- Municipality: Bergen
- Borough: Bergenhus

Area
  - Total: 0.33 km^{2} (0.13 sq mi)

Population (2010)
  - Total: 2,345
  - Density: 7,100/km^{2} (18,000/sq mi)
- As an unofficial area the population can't be fully determined
- Time zone: UTC+01:00 (CET)
  - Summer (DST): UTC+02:00 (CEST)

Møhlenpris (formerly Vestre Sydnes) is a neighbourhood in the city of Bergen in Vestland county, Norway. It is next to the Puddefjorden in the borough of Bergenhus. The neighbourhood is named after Jørgen Thor Møhlen, who was a shipowner, slave trader, innovator and businessman who established some industry at Møhlenpris in the late 17th century. Most of the buildings date from the late 19th and early 20th centuries.

== Møhlenpris today ==
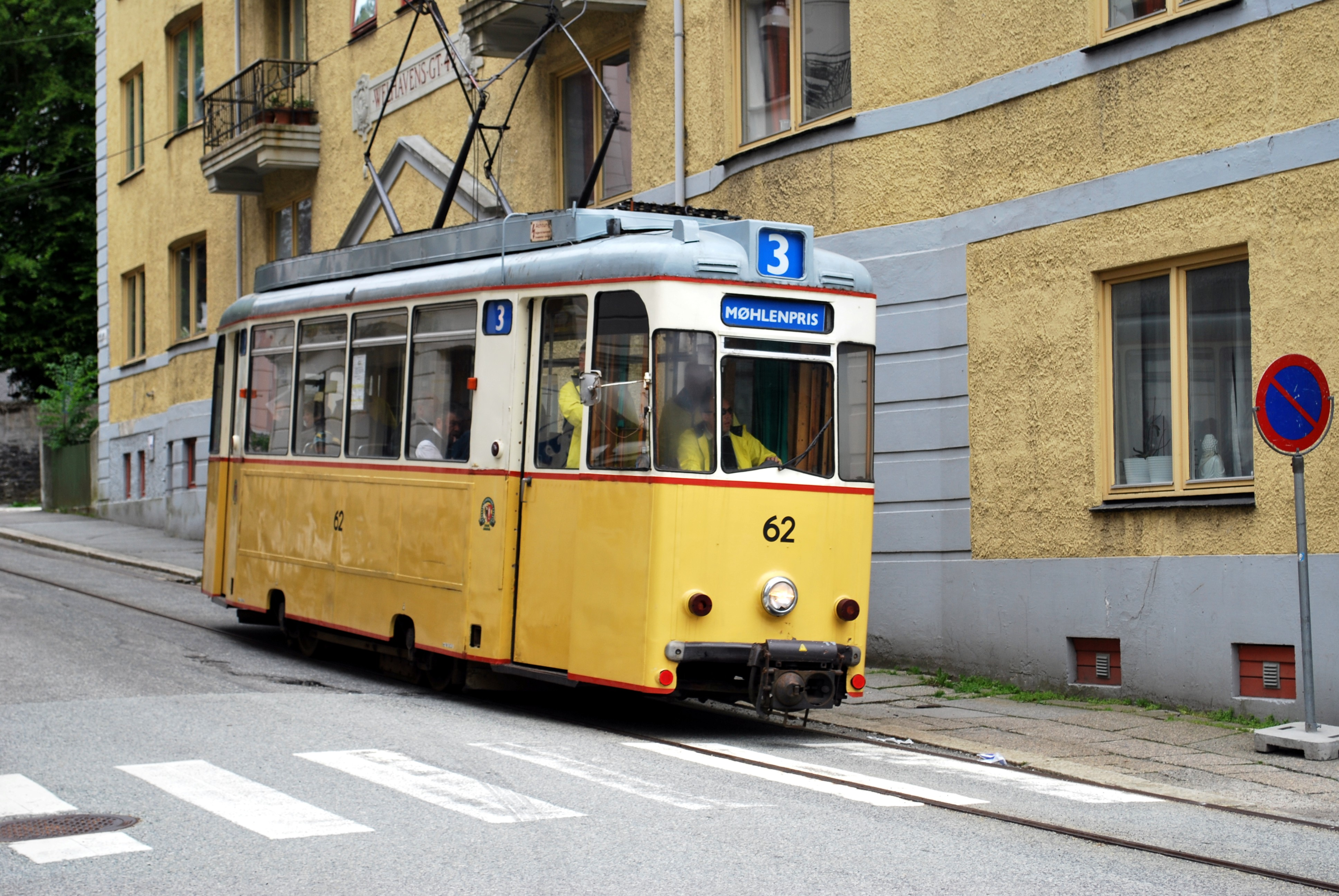
The heritage street car at Møhlenpris.

Møhlenpris holds a range of residential buildings, mainly between Puddefjord Bridge in the north and Wolff Street in the south, an area of industry between the start of Wolff Street and south to Høyteknologisenteret expanded in 2009 and 2010 to include most of Marineholmen, Møhlenpris sports field between industrial area and residential area, and any further industrial and port activities along the waterfront outside the residential area, and finally some office buildings immediately north of Puddefjord Bridge. Once in office buildings are also two notable buildings: Møhlenpris Manor, probably from 1680, and Monclairhuset from about 1760 (old Bergen Housewife School) as the bridge passes directly above. The lower parts of Nygårdsparken can also be said to be part of Møhlenpris.

Rafto Foundation for Human Rights and the popular science adventure center Bergen Science is also in the neighborhood.

== Housing areas ==
The residential area has a strictly rectangular street network. Most of the buildings are brick buildings from the late 19th and early 20th centuries. Olaf Ryes vei was built about 1880, and thus created the first road between Bergen, and Møhlenpris over Nygårdshøyden. On that street, the student-run club Hulen is in an old air raid shelter.

== Notable residents ==
- Torstein Dahle, former leader of the Norwegian party Rødt
