= Gullsteinen =

Mountain in Bergen, Norway

Highest point
- Elevation: 349 m (1,145 ft)
- Prominence: 60 m (200 ft)
- Parent peak: Løvstakken
- Isolation: 1.6 km (0.99 mi)
- Coordinates: 60°20′39″N 5°18′45″E

Geography
- Location: Vestland, Norway

Climbing
- Easiest route: Hiking

Gullsteinen is a mountain in Bergen Municipality in Vestland county, Norway. The large hill is part of the Løvstakken mountain massif, located south of the centre of the city of Bergen. Its peak is located 354 metres (1,161 ft) above sea level, and is accessible by hiking paths from all sides.

== See also ==
- List of mountains of Norway
