= Løvstakken =

Mountain in Norway

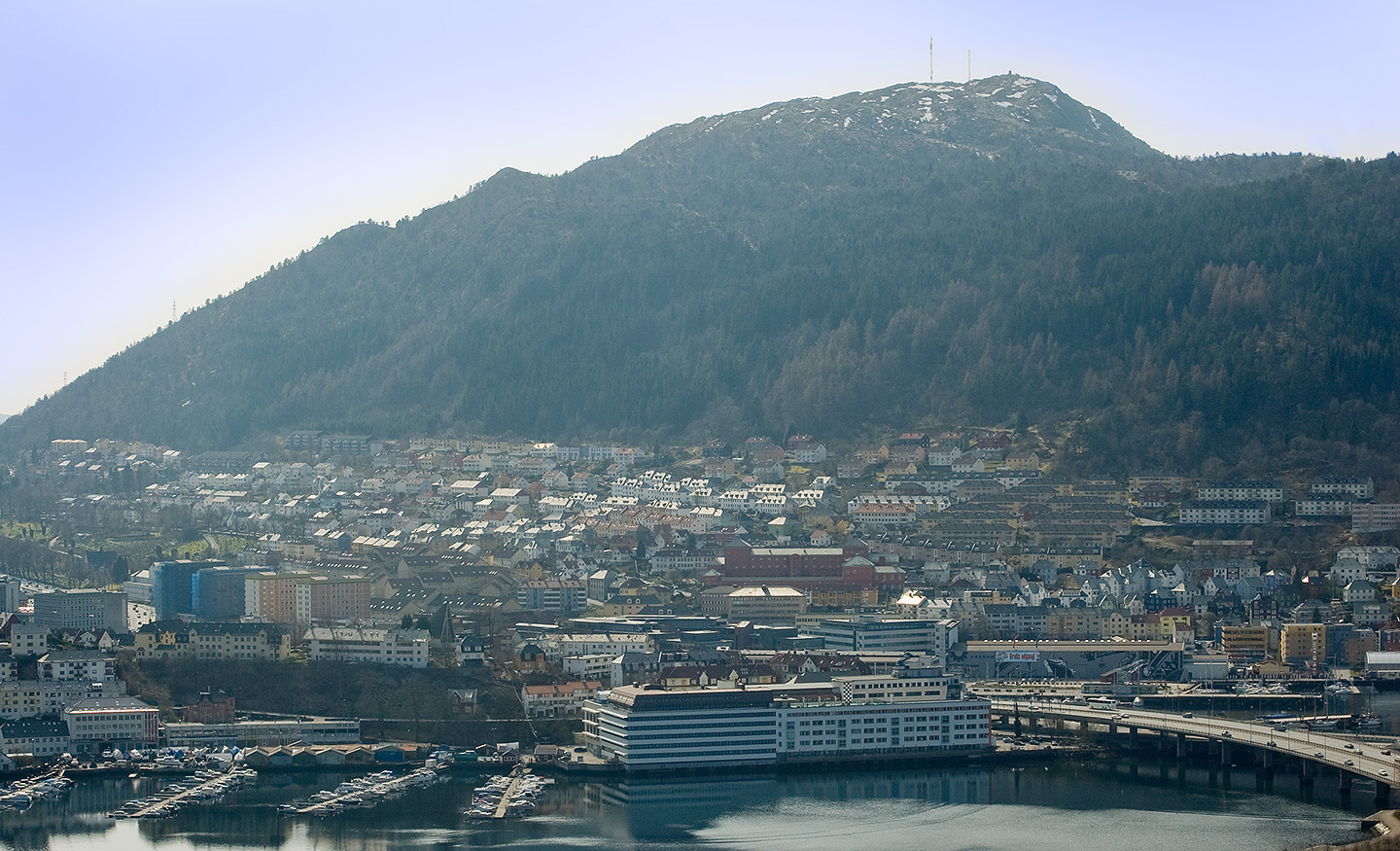
- Løvstakken seen from the north

Highest point
- Elevation: 477 m (1,565 ft)
- Prominence: 457 m (1,499 ft)
- Isolation: 4.2 km (2.6 mi)
- Coordinates: 60°21′39″N 5°19′09″E

Geography
- Location: Vestland, Norway
- Topo map: 1115 I Bergen

Climbing
- Easiest route: Hiking

Løvstakken is a mountain in Bergen Municipality in Vestland county, Norway. It is one of the Seven Mountains that surround the center of the city of Bergen. The 477-metre (1,565 ft) tall mountain is located between the Fyllingsdalen and Bergensdalen valleys on the Bergen Peninsula. Løvstakken and the forests nearby are popular hiking areas among the locals since it is essentially located in the central area of Norway's second largest city. Gullsteinen, a large hill located south of the summit of Løvstakken, is also part of the mountain massif and borders the protected forest area of Langeskogen.

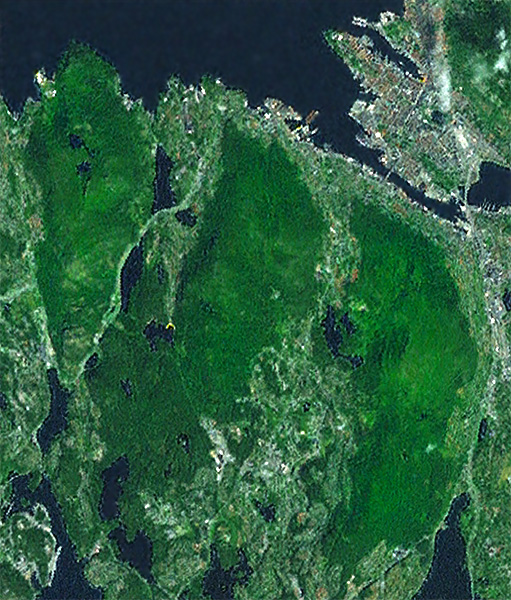
Satellite image of Løvstakken (far right).

The neighbourhood of Løvstakksiden in Årstad borough, north of the summit, is named after the mountain. The neighborhood was historically a borough of Bergen, but it has more recently dissolved and its areas were merged with Årstad and Fyllingsdalen boroughs.

== See also ==
- List of mountains of Norway
