= Løvstakken Tunnel =

Road tunnel

Løvstakken Tunnel Løvstakktunnelen
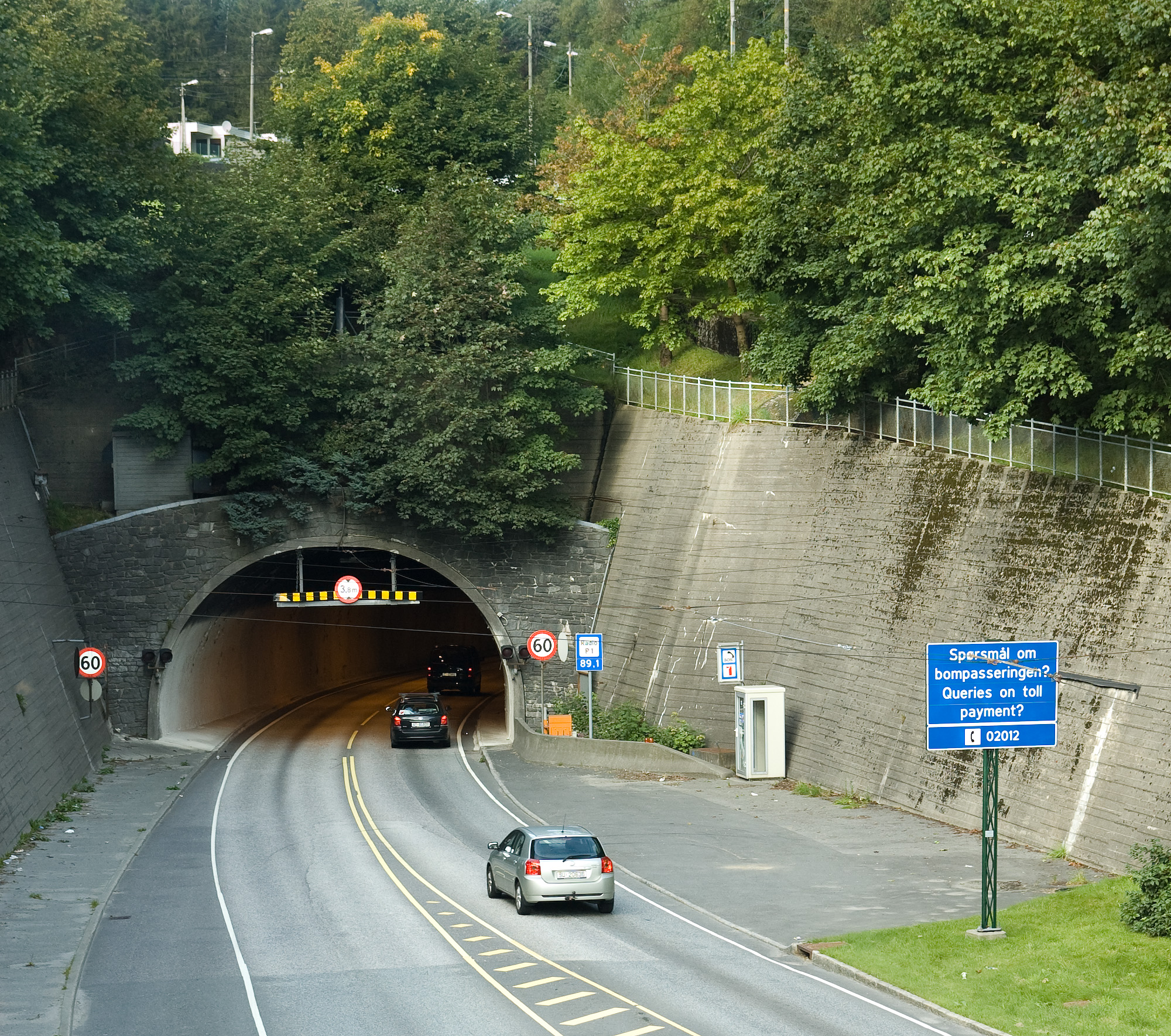
- Løvstakktunnelen's portal in Fyllingsdalen
- Interactive map of Løvstakken Tunnel; Løvstakktunnelen

Overview
- Location: Vestland, Norway
- Coordinates: 60.3736°N 5.30611°E
- Status: In use
- Route: Fv544
- Start: Gyldenpris
- End: Fyllingsdalen

Operation
- Opened: 1968
- Operator: Norwegian Public Roads Administration

Technical
- Length: 2,045 metres (6,709 ft)
- No. of lanes: 2
- Operating speed: 60 km/h (37 mph)

The Løvstakken Tunnel (Norwegian: Løvstakktunnelen) is a road tunnel in Bergen Municipality in Vestland county, Norway. The tunnel connects the Fyllingsdalen area with the eastern part of the borough of Laksevåg and the city centre of Bergen. It was built in 1968 to improve connectivity with the newly developed area. The tunnel had an average daily traffic of 17,015 vehicles in 2007, down from 17,702 vehicles in 2000. The tunnel is 2,045 metres (6,709 ft) long.

In 2002, a safety study by the German company Deutsche Montan Technologie found serious shortcomings in the tunnel's safety, and among 30 European tunnels studied, the tunnel was ranked in 27th place. To improve matters, the flammable polyethylene foam in the tunnel was removed, fire extinguishers and emergency phones were installed at 50-metre (160 ft) and 250-metre (820 ft) intervals respectively, surveillance cameras, emergency lighting, and emergency signage were introduced, and the speed limit was reduced from 70 to 60 kilometres per hour (43 to 37 mph). This raised the safety standard to minimum requirements, but the traffic volume is still large for a single tunnel.
