= Fjell Municipality =

Former municipality in Hordaland, Norway

Fjell Municipality Fjell kommune
- Former municipality
- Fjeld herred (historic name)
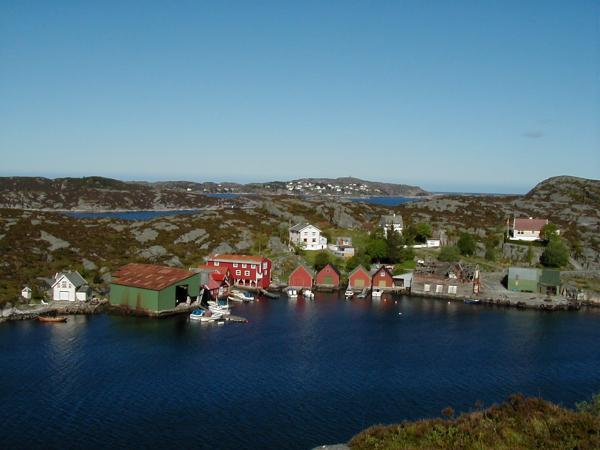
- View of the village of Misje

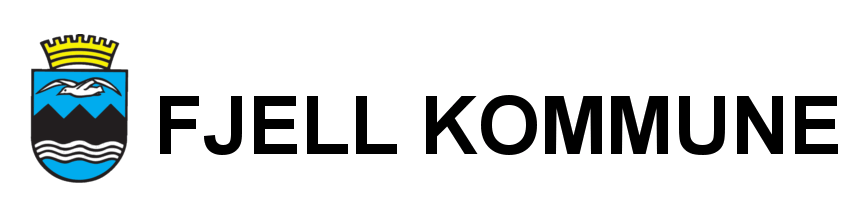
- Flag Coat of arms

- Hordaland within Norway

- Fjell within Hordaland
- Coordinates: 60°20′50″N 05°02′49″E
- Country: Norway
- County: Hordaland
- District: Midhordland
- Established: 1 Jan 1838
  - Created as: Formannskapsdistrikt
- Disestablished: 1 Jan 2020
  - Succeeded by: Øygarden Municipality
- Administrative centre: Straume

Government
  - Mayor (2015–2019): Marianne S. Bjorøy (Ap)

Area (upon dissolution)
  - Total: 148.17 km^{2} (57.21 sq mi)
  - Land: 141.19 km^{2} (54.51 sq mi)
  - Water: 6.98 km^{2} (2.69 sq mi) 4.7%
  - Rank: #355 in Norway
- Highest elevation: 341.1 m (1,119 ft)

Population (2019)
  - Total: 26,166
  - Rank: #43 in Norway
  - Density: 176.6/km^{2} (457/sq mi)
  - Change (10 years): ▲ +21.7%
- Demonym(s): Fjellsoknar; Fjellsokning

Official language
  - Norwegian form: Nynorsk
- Time zone: UTC+01:00 (CET)
  - Summer (DST): UTC+02:00 (CEST)
- ISO 3166 code: NO-1246

Fjell is a former municipality in the old Hordaland county, Norway. The 148.17-square-kilometre (57.21 sq mi) municipality existed from 1838 until its dissolution in 2020. The area is now part of Øygarden Municipality in the traditional district of Midhordland in Vestland county. The administrative centre was the village of Straume. Other villages in the municipality included Ågotnes, Fjell, Foldnes, Knappskog, Knarrvika, Kolltveit, Landro, and Sekkingstad.

The municipality consisted of several islands west of the city of Bergen, the major ones being Litlesotra, the northern part of Store Sotra, Bildøyna, Bjorøyna, Misje, and Turøyna. Due to the opening of the Sotra Bridge to the mainland in 1971 and its proximity to the city of Bergen, the population more than tripled, growning from less than 7,000 to over 26,000 by the time of its dissolution in 2020. This resulted in major traffic jams over the bridge every day. The highway that leads to Bergen has reduced the traveling time to only fifteen minutes from the municipal centre at Straume on Litlesotra to the center of Bergen.

At the time of its dissolution in 2020, the 148.17-square-kilometre (57.21 sq mi) municipality was the 355th largest by area out of the 422 municipalities in Norway. Fjell Municipality was the 43rd most populous municipality in Norway with a population of 26,166. The municipality's population density was 176.6 inhabitants per square kilometre (457/sq mi) and its population had increased by 21.7% over the previous 10-year period.

== General information ==
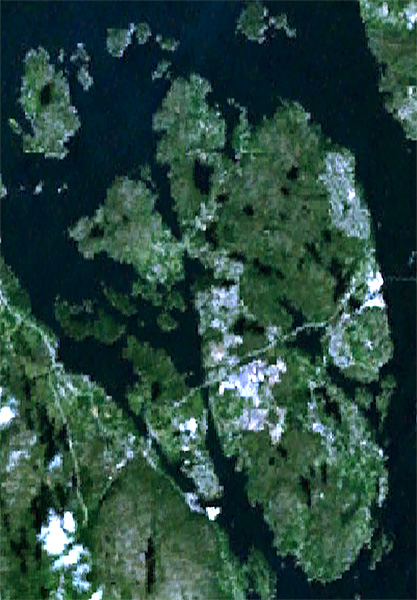
Aerial view of the island of Litlesotra

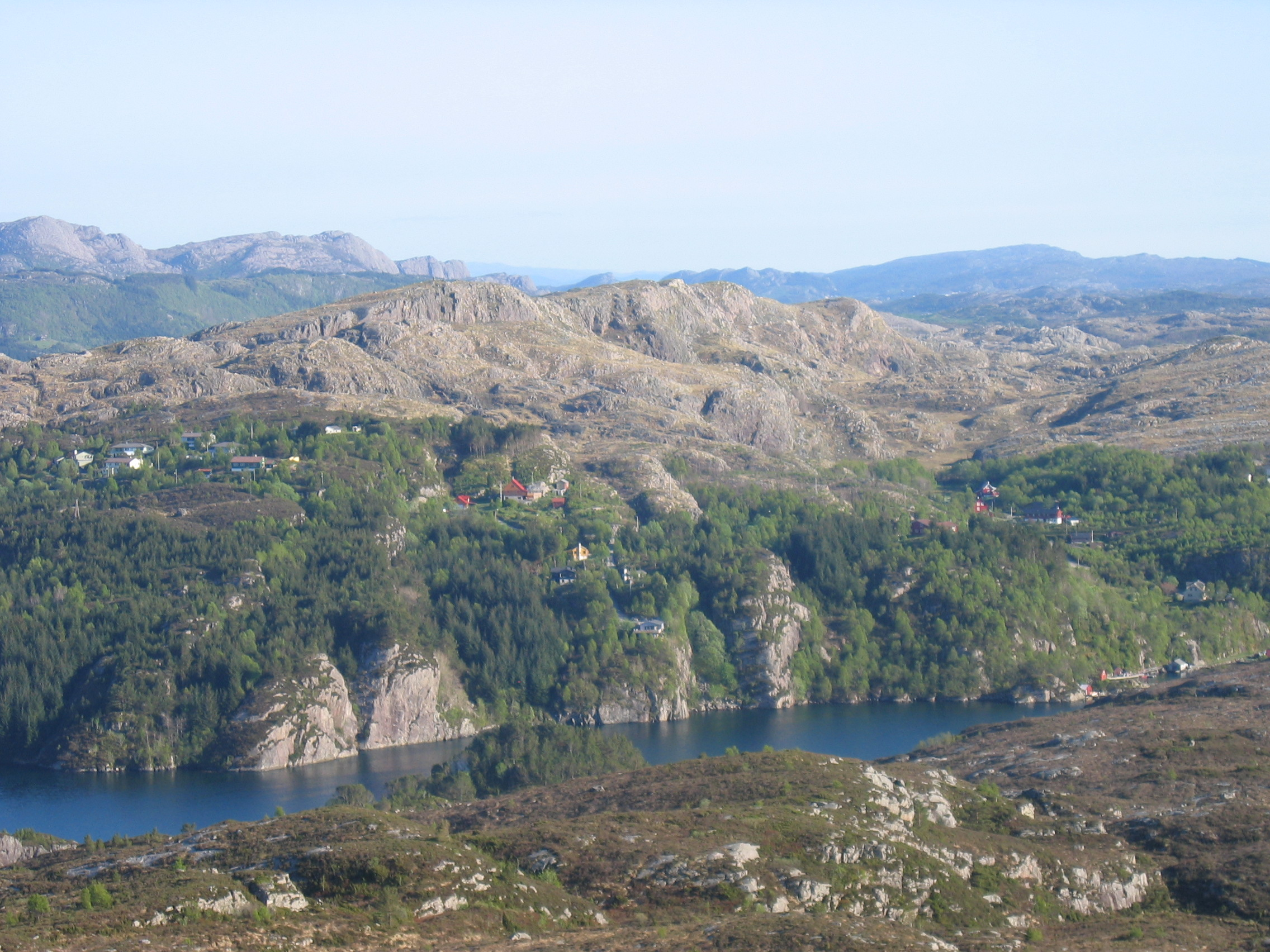
View of the rugged mountainous landscape of Fjell

The parish of Fjæld (later spelled Fjell) was established as a municipality on 1 January 1838 (see formannskapsdistrikt law). During the 1960s, there were many municipal mergers across Norway due to the work of the Schei Committee. On 1 January 1964, the islands of Misje and Turøyna (population: 404) were transferred from Herdla Municipality to Fjell Municipality.

On 1 January 2020, there was a large municipal merger including three neighboring municipalities. Fjell Municipality, Sund Municipality, and Øygarden Municipality were merged into a new, much larger Øygarden Municipality. Historically, this municipality was part of the old Hordaland county. On 1 January 2020, Hordaland county became a part of the newly-formed Vestland county (after Hordaland and Sogn og Fjordane counties were merged).

=== Name ===
The municipality (originally the parish) is named after the old Fjelde farm (Old Norse: Fjall) since the first Fjell Church was built there. The name is identical to the modern Norwegian word fjell which means "mountain". The oldest form of the name was Undir Fjalli which means "under/below the mountain". Historically, the name of the municipality was spelled Fjæld or Fjeld. On 3 November 1917, a royal resolution changed the spelling of the name of the municipality to Fjell.

=== Coat of arms ===
The coat of arms was adopted by the municipal council on 27 April 1957 and it was in use until 1 January 2020 when the municipality was dissolved. The blazon is "Azure, a seagull volant argent over a fess sable dancetty topped and wavy with three bars wavy argent beneath". This means the arms have a blue field (background) and the charge is a seagull flying over three triangular black mountain shapes over three wavy lines. The seagull and wavy lines have a tincture of argent which means they are commonly colored white, but if it is made out of metal, then silver is used. A mural crown was often displayed above the shield. The arms were designed to show the geography of the municipality, specifically the sea (shown with three wavy lines) and the steep mountains (shown with three black triangular shapes). The seagull shown above the mountains is a common bird in the area. The arms are canting since the name of the municipality means "mountain". The arms were designed by Magnus Hardeland, but they were never formally approved by the government because they did not meet the Norwegian heraldic guidelines for coats of arms.

=== Churches ===
The Church of Norway had one parish (sokn) within Fjell Municipality. It is part of the Vesthordland prosti (deanery) in the Diocese of Bjørgvin.

Churches in Fjell Municipality
Parish (sokn)	Church name	Location of the church	Year built
Fjell	Fjell Church	Fjell	1874
Fjell	Foldnes Church	Foldnes	2001
Fjell	Landro Church	Landro	1977

== Geography ==
Fjell was an island municipality located entirely on islands off the coast of the mainland Bergen Peninsula. It covered many islands in a large archipelago that stretched from Sund Municipality in the south to Fedje Municipality in the north. The largest island in Fjell Municipality was Sotra, although only the northern half of the island is part of the municipality. The second-largest island was Litlesotra, where the largest village area in Fjell is located (the village of Straume). The small island of Bildøyna is located between those two islands. The small island of Geitanger lies north of Bildøyna and the small island of Bjorøyna lies to the south. Bjorøyna is not connected to the rest of the municipality by road, but there is the undersea Bjorøy Tunnel that connects it to the mainland of Bergen Municipality. On the western side of Sotra, the smaller islands of Algrøyna, Lokøyna, and Syltøyna are located. On the north end of Sotra lies the small islands of Misje and Turøyna.

The highest point in the municipality was the 341.1-metre (1,119 ft) tall mountain Liatårnet on the island of Sotra, just southeast of the village of Fjell. Sund Municipality was located to the south, Bergen Municipality was located to the east, Askøy Municipality was to the northeast, and Øygarden Municipality was located to the northwest. The North Sea was located to the west.

== History ==
Fjell Municipality was the location of Fjell Fortress, a World War II German mountaintop fortification designed to command all water approaches to the port of Bergen.

== Population ==
Historical population

Year	Pop.	±%
1845	1,971	—
1855	2,242	+13.7%
1865	2,553	+13.9%
1875	2,802	+9.8%
1891	3,185	+13.7%
1900	3,502	+10.0%

Year	Pop.	±%
1910	3,806	+8.7%
1920	4,902	+28.8%
1930	4,625	−5.7%
1946	5,169	+11.8%
1951	5,172	+0.1%
1960	5,453	+5.4%

Year	Pop.	±%
1970	6,798	+24.7%
1980	10,177	+49.7%
1990	14,735	+44.8%
2000	18,178	+23.4%
2010	21,823	+20.1%
2019	26,166	+19.9%

Note: The municipal borders were changed in 1964, causing a significant change in the population.
Source: Statistics Norway and Norwegian Historical Data Centre

== Government ==
While it existed, Fjell Municipality was responsible for primary education (through 10th grade), outpatient health services, senior citizen services, welfare and other social services, zoning, economic development, and municipal roads and utilities. The municipality was governed by a municipal council of directly elected representatives. The mayor was indirectly elected by a vote of the municipal council. The municipality was under the jurisdiction of the Bergen District Court and the Gulating Court of Appeal.

=== Municipal council ===
The municipal council (Kommunestyre) of Fjell Municipality was made up of 35 representatives that were elected to four year terms. The tables below show the historical composition of the council by political party.

Fjell kommunestyre 2015–2019
Party name (in Nynorsk)	Number of representatives
Labour Party (Arbeidarpartiet)	10
Progress Party (Framstegspartiet)	4
Green Party (Miljøpartiet Dei Grøne)	1
Conservative Party (Høgre)	8
Christian Democratic Party (Kristeleg Folkeparti)	4
Centre Party (Senterpartiet)	1
Socialist Left Party (Sosialistisk Venstreparti)	1
Liberal Party (Venstre)	2
Sotra List (Sotralista)	4
Total number of members:	35
Note: On 1 January 2020, Fjell Municipality, Sund Municipality, and Øygarden Municipality were merged to form the new Øygarden Municipality.

Fjell kommunestyre 2011–2015
Party name (in Nynorsk)	Number of representatives
Labour Party (Arbeidarpartiet)	10
Progress Party (Framstegspartiet)	8
Conservative Party (Høgre)	13
Christian Democratic Party (Kristeleg Folkeparti)	4
Centre Party (Senterpartiet)	1
Socialist Left Party (Sosialistisk Venstreparti)	1
Liberal Party (Venstre)	2
Sotra List (Sotralista)	6
Total number of members:	45

Fjell kommunestyre 2007–2011
Party name (in Nynorsk)	Number of representatives
Labour Party (Arbeidarpartiet)	9
Progress Party (Framstegspartiet)	15
Conservative Party (Høgre)	7
Christian Democratic Party (Kristeleg Folkeparti)	5
Centre Party (Senterpartiet)	1
Socialist Left Party (Sosialistisk Venstreparti)	1
Liberal Party (Venstre)	1
Sotra List (Sotralista)	6
Total number of members:	45

Fjell kommunestyre 2003–2007
Party name (in Nynorsk)	Number of representatives
Labour Party (Arbeidarpartiet)	9
Progress Party (Framstegspartiet)	13
Conservative Party (Høgre)	6
Christian Democratic Party (Kristeleg Folkeparti)	5
Centre Party (Senterpartiet)	1
Socialist Left Party (Sosialistisk Venstreparti)	3
Sotra List (Sotralista)	8
Total number of members:	45

Fjell kommunestyre 1999–2003
Party name (in Nynorsk)	Number of representatives
Labour Party (Arbeidarpartiet)	11
Progress Party (Framstegspartiet)	7
Conservative Party (Høgre)	7
Christian Democratic Party (Kristeleg Folkeparti)	7
Centre Party (Senterpartiet)	1
Socialist Left Party (Sosialistisk Venstreparti)	2
Sotra List (Sotralista)	10
Total number of members:	45

Fjell kommunestyre 1995–1999
Party name (in Nynorsk)	Number of representatives
Labour Party (Arbeidarpartiet)	9
Progress Party (Framstegspartiet)	6
Conservative Party (Høgre)	7
Christian Democratic Party (Kristeleg Folkeparti)	8
Centre Party (Senterpartiet)	4
Socialist Left Party (Sosialistisk Venstreparti)	1
Liberal Party (Venstre)	1
Sotra List (Sotralista)	9
Total number of members:	45

Fjell kommunestyre 1991–1995
Party name (in Nynorsk)	Number of representatives
Labour Party (Arbeidarpartiet)	11
Progress Party (Framstegspartiet)	3
Conservative Party (Høgre)	10
Christian Democratic Party (Kristeleg Folkeparti)	9
Centre Party (Senterpartiet)	4
Socialist Left Party (Sosialistisk Venstreparti)	3
Sotra list (Sotralista)	4
Moderate youth list (Moderat ungdomslist)	1
Total number of members:	45

Fjell kommunestyre 1987–1991
Party name (in Nynorsk)	Number of representatives
Labour Party (Arbeidarpartiet)	14
Progress Party (Framstegspartiet)	6
Conservative Party (Høgre)	11
Christian Democratic Party (Kristeleg Folkeparti)	9
Centre Party (Senterpartiet)	3
Socialist Left Party (Sosialistisk Venstreparti)	1
Joint list of the Liberal Party (Venstre) and Liberal People's Party (Liberale Folkepartiet)	1
Total number of members:	45

Fjell kommunestyre 1983–1987
Party name (in Nynorsk)	Number of representatives
Labour Party (Arbeidarpartiet)	10
Progress Party (Framstegspartiet)	3
Conservative Party (Høgre)	10
Christian Democratic Party (Kristeleg Folkeparti)	7
Centre Party (Senterpartiet)	3
Socialist Left Party (Sosialistisk Venstreparti)	1
Liberal Party (Venstre)	1
Total number of members:	35

Fjell kommunestyre 1979–1983
Party name (in Nynorsk)	Number of representatives
Labour Party (Arbeidarpartiet)	8
Progress Party (Framstegspartiet)	1
Conservative Party (Høgre)	11
Christian Democratic Party (Kristeleg Folkeparti)	9
New People's Party (Nye Folkepartiet)	1
Centre Party (Senterpartiet)	3
Socialist Left Party (Sosialistisk Venstreparti)	1
Liberal Party (Venstre)	1
Total number of members:	35

Fjell kommunestyre 1975–1979
Party name (in Nynorsk)	Number of representatives
Labour Party (Arbeidarpartiet)	7
Conservative Party (Høgre)	7
Christian Democratic Party (Kristeleg Folkeparti)	10
New People's Party (Nye Folkepartiet)	2
Centre Party (Senterpartiet)	4
Socialist Left Party (Sosialistisk Venstreparti)	1
Cross-party common list (Tverrpolitisk Samlingsliste)	3
Election list for North Fjell (Valliste for Nordre Fjell)	1
Total number of members:	35

Fjell kommunestyre 1971–1975
Party name (in Nynorsk)	Number of representatives
Labour Party (Arbeidarpartiet)	7
Conservative Party (Høgre)	2
Christian Democratic Party (Kristeleg Folkeparti)	7
Centre Party (Senterpartiet)	3
Liberal Party (Venstre)	3
Local List(s) (Lokale lister)	5
Total number of members:	27

Fjell kommunestyre 1967–1971
Party name (in Nynorsk)	Number of representatives
Labour Party (Arbeidarpartiet)	6
Conservative Party (Høgre)	3
Christian Democratic Party (Kristeleg Folkeparti)	7
Centre Party (Senterpartiet)	3
Liberal Party (Venstre)	4
Local List(s) (Lokale lister)	4
Total number of members:	27

Fjell kommunestyre 1963–1967
Party name (in Nynorsk)	Number of representatives
Labour Party (Arbeidarpartiet)	8
Christian Democratic Party (Kristeleg Folkeparti)	7
Liberal Party (Venstre)	3
Local List(s) (Lokale lister)	9
Total number of members:	27

Fjell heradsstyre 1959–1963
Party name (in Nynorsk)	Number of representatives
Labour Party (Arbeidarpartiet)	7
Conservative Party (Høgre)	1
Christian Democratic Party (Kristeleg Folkeparti)	9
Centre Party (Senterpartiet)	3
Liberal Party (Venstre)	4
Local List(s) (Lokale lister)	1
Total number of members:	25

Fjell heradsstyre 1955–1959
Party name (in Nynorsk)	Number of representatives
Labour Party (Arbeidarpartiet)	4
Christian Democratic Party (Kristeleg Folkeparti)	5
Farmers' Party (Bondepartiet)	3
Liberal Party (Venstre)	2
Local List(s) (Lokale lister)	11
Total number of members:	25

Fjell heradsstyre 1951–1955
Party name (in Nynorsk)	Number of representatives
Labour Party (Arbeidarpartiet)	5
Conservative Party (Høgre)	1
Christian Democratic Party (Kristeleg Folkeparti)	7
Farmers' Party (Bondepartiet)	3
Liberal Party (Venstre)	7
Local List(s) (Lokale lister)	1
Total number of members:	24

Fjell heradsstyre 1947–1951
Party name (in Nynorsk)	Number of representatives
Labour Party (Arbeidarpartiet)	6
Christian Democratic Party (Kristeleg Folkeparti)	8
Liberal Party (Venstre)	7
Joint List(s) of Non-Socialist Parties (Borgarlege Felleslister)	3
Total number of members:	24

Fjell heradsstyre 1945–1947
Party name (in Nynorsk)	Number of representatives
Labour Party (Arbeidarpartiet)	9
Christian Democratic Party (Kristeleg Folkeparti)	7
Liberal Party (Venstre)	8
Total number of members:	24

Fjell heradsstyre 1937–1941*
Party name (in Nynorsk)	Number of representatives
Farmers' Party (Bondepartiet)	1
Liberal Party (Venstre)	7
Joint List(s) of Non-Socialist Parties (Borgarlege Felleslister)	8
Local List(s) (Lokale lister)	8
Total number of members:	24
Note: Due to the German occupation of Norway during World War II, no elections were held for new municipal councils until after the war ended in 1945.

=== Mayors ===
The mayor (Nynorsk: ordførar) of Fjell Municipality was the political leader of the municipality and the chairperson of the municipal council. The following people held this position:

- 1838–1843: Nils Arefjord
- 1844–1853: Mathias Ø. Nordahl
- 1854–1855: Nils Arefjord
- 1856–1857: Nils Mikkelsen Kallestad
- 1858–1861: Nils Arefjord
- 1862–1867: Erik O. Ekerhovd
- 1867–1887: H.J.W. Juuhl
- 1888–1895: Anders Nilssen Langøen
- 1896–1901: Mathias Nordahl
- 1902–1913: Mads O. Ramstad
- 1914–1919: Olai Bjorø
- 1920–1922: Mads O. Ramstad
- 1923–1928: Nils O. Pedersen Storesund
- 1929–1941: Hans Rønnestrand
- 1941–1944: Asbjørn Gloppestad
- 1944–1945: Olav Nygård
- 1945–1945: Hans Rønnestrand
- 1946–1947: Ole Kristian Bjorøy
- 1948–1951: Ole H. Fjeld
- 1952–1957: Mons M. Kobbeltvedt
- 1958–1965: Ingvald Ulveseth (Ap)
- 1966–1967: Anders Andås (KrF)
- 1967–1979: Olav Midttun (KrF)
- 1979–1983: Torolv Morlandstø (KrF)
- 1983–1987: Norvald Nesse (H)
- 1987–1991: Bjørn Christensen (Ap)
- 1991–2003: Ole G. Fredheim (Ap)
- 2003–2007: Jan Utkilen (LL)
- 2007–2010: Lars Lie (H)
- 2010–2015: Eli Årdal Berland (H)
- 2015–2019: Marianne Sandahl Bjorøy (Ap)

== See also ==
- List of former municipalities of Norway
