= Herdla Municipality =

Former municipality in Hordaland, Norway

Herdla Municipality Herdla herad
- Former municipality
- Herlø herred (historic name)
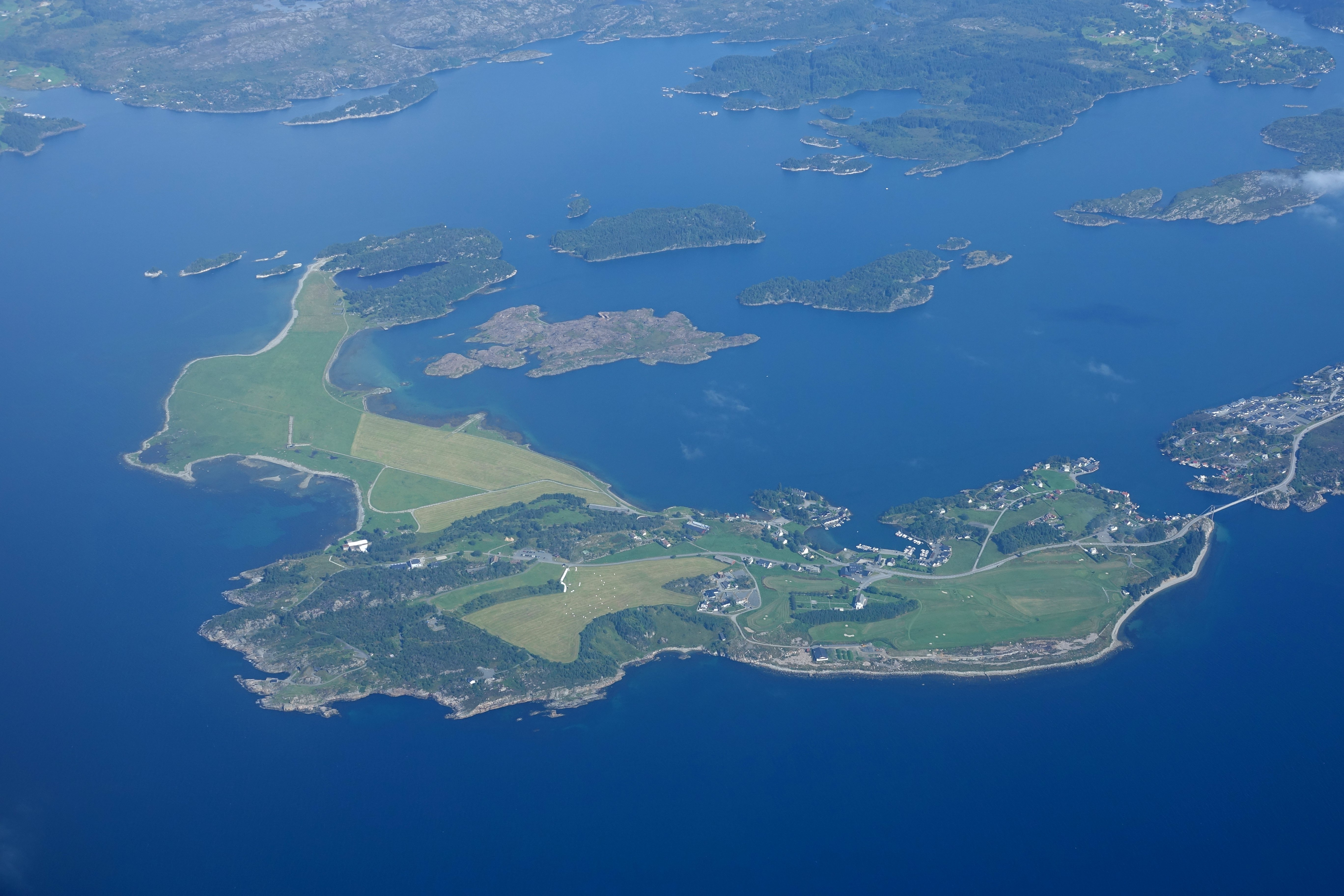
- Aerial view of the island of Herdla

- Hordaland within Norway

- Herdla within Hordaland
- Coordinates: 60°34′24″N 04°56′51″E
- Country: Norway
- County: Hordaland
- District: Nordhordland
- Established: 1 Jan 1871
  - Preceded by: Manger Municipality
- Disestablished: 1 Jan 1964
  - Succeeded by: Askøy, Fjell, Meland, Radøy, and Øygarden municipalities
- Administrative centre: Herdla

Government
  - Mayor (1959–1963): Jens O. Rong (V)

Area (upon dissolution)
  - Total: 114.5 km^{2} (44.2 sq mi)
  - Rank: #492 in Norway
- Highest elevation: 324 m (1,063 ft)

Population (1963)
  - Total: 4,991
  - Rank: #183 in Norway
  - Density: 43.6/km^{2} (113/sq mi)
  - Change (10 years): ▼ −3.3%

Official language
  - Norwegian form: Nynorsk
- Time zone: UTC+01:00 (CET)
  - Summer (DST): UTC+02:00 (CEST)
- ISO 3166 code: NO-1258

Herdla is a former municipality in the old Hordaland county, Norway. The 114.5-square-kilometre (44.2 sq mi) municipality existed from 1871 until its dissolution in 1964. The area is now divided between Alver Municipality, Askøy Municipality, and Øygarden Municipality in the traditional district of Nordhordland in Vestland county. The administrative centre was the small island-village of Herdla.

Prior to its dissolution in 1964, the 114.5-square-kilometre (44.2 sq mi) municipality was the 492nd largest by area out of the 689 municipalities in Norway. Herdla Municipality was the 183rd most populous municipality in Norway with a population of about 4,991. The municipality's population density was 43.6 inhabitants per square kilometre (113/sq mi) and its population had decreased by 3.3% over the previous 10-year period.

== General information ==
On 1 January 1871, the western island district of Manger Municipality was separated to form the new Herlø Municipality (the spelling was later changed to Herdla in 1917). Initially, the new municipality had 2,484 residents.

During the 1960s, there were many municipal mergers across Norway due to the work of the Schei Committee. In January 1964, Herdla Municipality was dissolved and its land was split up as follows:

- the islands of Misje and Turøy (population: 404) became part of Fjell Municipality
- the island of Herdla and all of Herdla Municipality located on the island of Askøy (population: 1,564) became part of Askøy Municipality
- all of Herdla Municipality on the island of Holsnøy (population: 811) became part of Meland Municipality
- all of Herdla Municipality located west of the Hjeltefjorden (population: 2,131) became part of Øygarden Municipality
- the island of Bogno (population: 29) became part of Radøy Municipality

=== Name ===
The municipality (originally the parish) is named after the old Herlø farm (Old Norse: Herðla) since the first Herdla Church was built there. The meaning of the name is uncertain. One possibility is that it is derived from hǫrðar which is the old name for a person from medieval Hordaland. Another possibility is that it means "to split" or "to divorce", likely referring to the fact that the island on which the farm is located is separated from Askøya by the narrow Herdlesundet strait. Historically, the name of the municipality was spelled Herlø. On 3 November 1917, a royal resolution changed the spelling of the name of the municipality to Herdla.

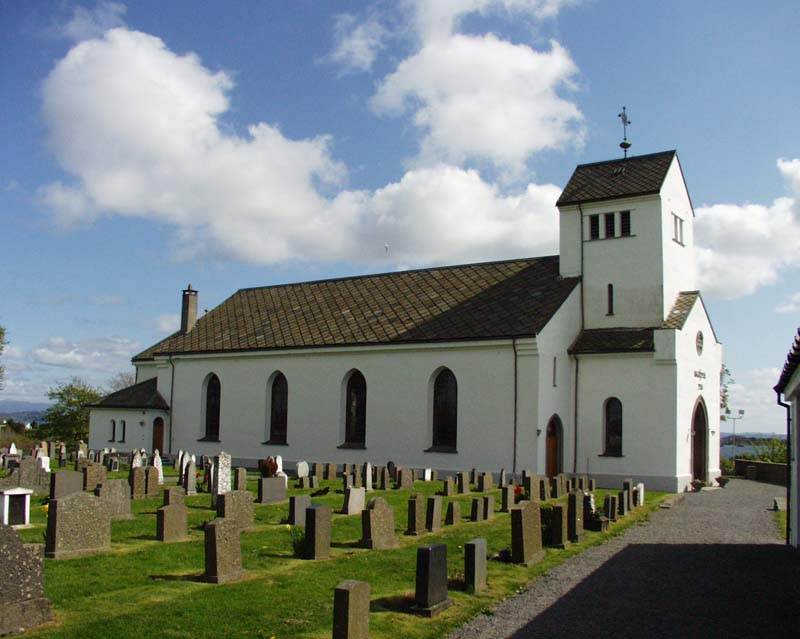
Herdla Church

=== Churches ===
The Church of Norway had one parish (sokn) within Herdla Municipality. At the time of the municipal dissolution, it was part of the Herdla prestegjeld and the Nordhordland prosti (deanery) in the Diocese of Bjørgvin.

Churches in Herdla Municipality
Parish (sokn)	Church name	Location of the church	Year built
Herdla	Herdla Church	Herdla	1863
Herdla	Blomvåg Chapel	Blomvåg	1931

Herdla Church (Herdla kirke) dates back to 1863. The stone structure has 600 seats. The original church was demolished in the 19th century because it had too little space for the congregation. During the Occupation of Norway by Nazi Germany, the tower and the roofs were removed because of the belief that the British Royal Air Force used the church to navigate attacks on the west coast of Norway. The church was restored during 1910, 1935, and 1950.

== Geography ==
The municipality encompassed a large group of about 2,000 islands and skerries covering about 115-square-kilometre (44 sq mi) of land area, to the northwest of the city of Bergen. The municipality included the northern third of the island of Holsnøy, the northern third of the island of Askøy, and the islands of Misje, Turøyna, Toftøyna, Rongøyna, Blomøyna, Ona, Bogno, and many smaller surrounding islands. The highest point in the municipality was the 324-metre (1,063 ft) tall mountain Eldsfjellet.

Manger Municipality was located to the north, Sæbø Municipality was located to the northeast, Meland Municipality was located to the east, Askøy Municipality was located to the south, Fjell Municipality was located to the southwest, and Hjelme Municipality was located to the northwest.

== Government ==
While it existed, Herdla Municipality was responsible for primary education (through 10th grade), outpatient health services, senior citizen services, welfare and other social services, zoning, economic development, and municipal roads and utilities. The municipality was governed by a municipal council of directly elected representatives. The mayor was indirectly elected by a vote of the municipal council. The municipality was under the jurisdiction of the Gulating Court of Appeal.

=== Municipal council ===
The municipal council (Heradsstyre) of Herdla Municipality was made up of 25 representatives that were elected to four year terms. The tables below show the historical composition of the council by political party.

Herdla heradsstyre 1959–1963
Party name (in Nynorsk)	Number of representatives
Labour Party (Arbeidarpartiet)	6
Conservative Party (Høgre)	2
Christian Democratic Party (Kristeleg Folkeparti)	8
Liberal Party (Venstre)	8
Local List(s) (Lokale lister)	1
Total number of members:	25

Herdla heradsstyre 1955–1959
Party name (in Nynorsk)	Number of representatives
Labour Party (Arbeidarpartiet)	6
Conservative Party (Høgre)	2
Christian Democratic Party (Kristeleg Folkeparti)	8
Liberal Party (Venstre)	6
Local List(s) (Lokale lister)	3
Total number of members:	25

Herdla heradsstyre 1951–1955
Party name (in Nynorsk)	Number of representatives
Labour Party (Arbeidarpartiet)	6
Conservative Party (Høgre)	2
Christian Democratic Party (Kristeleg Folkeparti)	7
Liberal Party (Venstre)	7
Local List(s) (Lokale lister)	2
Total number of members:	24

Herdla heradsstyre 1947–1951
Party name (in Nynorsk)	Number of representatives
Labour Party (Arbeidarpartiet)	5
Conservative Party (Høgre)	3
Christian Democratic Party (Kristeleg Folkeparti)	8
Liberal Party (Venstre)	8
Total number of members:	24

Herdla heradsstyre 1945–1947
Party name (in Nynorsk)	Number of representatives
Labour Party (Arbeidarpartiet)	8
Christian Democratic Party (Kristeleg Folkeparti)	5
Joint List(s) of Non-Socialist Parties (Borgarlege Felleslister)	2
Local List(s) (Lokale lister)	9
Total number of members:	24

Herdla heradsstyre 1937–1941*
Party name (in Nynorsk)	Number of representatives
Labour Party (Arbeidarpartiet)	9
Farmers' Party (Bondepartiet)	8
Joint list of the Conservative Party (Høgre) and the Free-minded People's Party (Frisindede Folkeparti)	4
Local List(s) (Lokale lister)	3
Total number of members:	24
Note: Due to the German occupation of Norway during World War II, no elections were held for new municipal councils until after the war ended in 1945.

=== Mayors ===
The mayor (Nynorsk: ordførar) of Herdla Municipality was the political leader of the municipality and the chairperson of the municipal council. The following people held this position:

- 1871–1873: Bernt Johan Nielsen
- 1874–1875: Knut Ryland
- 1876–1877: Gotshalk N. Eikeland
- 1878–1907: Rev. Wilhelm Nicolai Pedersen (H)
- 1908–1919: Nils Thorsteinsen Skjelanger
- 1919–1934: Mons A. Kårbø (V)
- 1934–1945: Anton Johannessen Rong (V)
- 1946–1955: Thorstein Skjelanger (V)
- 1955–1959: Anders K. Breivik (KrF)
- 1959–1963: Jens O. Rong (V)

== See also ==
- List of former municipalities of Norway
