= Rong, Norway =

Village in Øygarden Municipality, Norway

Rong
- Village
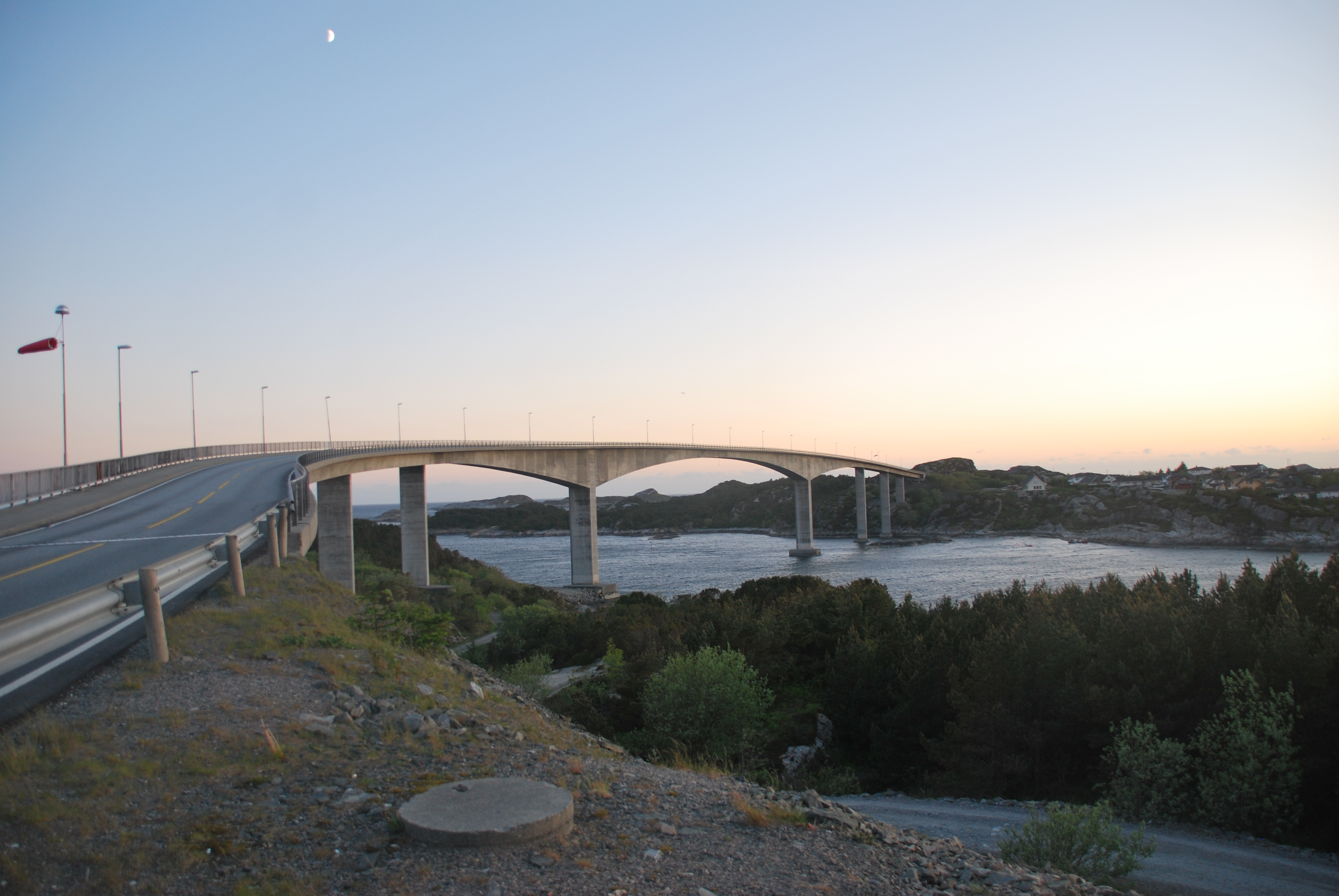
- View of the Rongesundet Bridge in Rong, heading towards Bergen
- Interactive map of Rong
- Coordinates: 60.51223°N 4.90266°E
- Country: Norway
- Region: Western Norway
- County: Vestland
- District: Midhordland
- Municipality: Øygarden Municipality
- Elevation: 14 m (46 ft)
- Time zone: UTC+01:00 (CET)
  - Summer (DST): UTC+02:00 (CEST)
- Post Code: 5337 Rong

Rong is a village in Øygarden Municipality in Vestland county, Norway. The village takes up most of the island of Rongøyna. The main road in the village is Norwegian county road 561 which runs north-south and connects the island to Toftøyna island to the south via the Rongesundet Bridge (over the Rongesundet strait) and to the island of Blomøyna to the north.

The local sports team is IL Skjergard. There is a scallops hatchery located at Rong. The village is the site of two municipal schools: Rong School (grades 1-7) and Øygarden School (grades 8-10).

== History ==
The village was made the administrative centre of Øygarden Municipality in 2009. Prior to that time, the village of Tjeldstø on the island of Alvøyna was the administrative centre. In 2020, there was a large municipal merger and the municipal centre was moved to Straume.
