= Knappskog =

Village in Øygarden Municipality, Norway

- Village
- Interactive map of Knappskog
- Coordinates: 60.37906°N 5.05602°E
- Country: Norway
- Region: Western Norway
- County: Vestland
- District: Midhordland
- Municipality: Øygarden Municipality

Area
  - Total: 0.9 km^{2} (0.35 sq mi)
- Elevation: 23 m (75 ft)

Population (2025)
  - Total: 1,601
  - Density: 1,779/km^{2} (4,610/sq mi)
- Time zone: UTC+01:00 (CET)
  - Summer (DST): UTC+02:00 (CEST)
- Post Code: 5353 Straume

Knappskog is a village in Øygarden Municipality in Vestland county, Norway. The village lies along the northeastern coast of the island of Sotra, about halfway between the villages of Ågotnes (to the north) and Kolltveit (to the south). The island of Geitanger lies about 500 metres (1,600 ft) off the coast of Knappskog.

The 0.9-square-kilometre (220-acre) village has a population (2025) of 1,601 and a population density of 1,779 inhabitants per square kilometre (4,610/sq mi).
