= IL Skjergard =

Norwegian sports club

- Full name: Idrettslaget Skjergard
- Founded: 16 December 1989
- Ground: Rong stadion, Rong, Øygarden Municipality
- League: 5. Divisjon
Home colours

Idrettslaget Skjergard is a Norwegian sports club from Øygarden Municipality. It has sections for football.

The club was founded on 16 December 1989 as an amalgamation of three local teams. The club colors are white. The men's football team currently resides in the Fifth Division (sixth tier). It last played in the Third Division in 1995. Its best known player is Tommy Knarvik.
