= Alvøyna =

Island in Vestland, Norway

Alvøyna Alvøy (unofficial)
- Interactive map of the island

Geography
- Location: Vestland, Norway
- Coordinates: 60.6080°N 4.8270°E
- Area: 12 km^{2} (4.6 sq mi)
- Length: 5.7 km (3.54 mi)
- Width: 3.7 km (2.3 mi)
- Highest elevation: 39 m (128 ft)
- Highest point: Sjonarhøyen

Administration
- Norway
- County: Vestland
- Municipality: Øygarden Municipality

Demographics
- Population: 785 (2017)

Alvøyna is an island in Øygarden Municipality in Vestland county, Norway. The 12-square-kilometre (4.6 sq mi) island is located west of the Hjeltefjorden and it had a population of 785 inhabitants in 2017. It sits just north of the island of Ona and just south of the island of Seløyna. The Sture Terminal, an oil terminal and endpoint of the Oseberg Transport System, was established here in 1988.

The village of Alveim is located on the west side of the island and the village of Tjeldstø lies on the eastern shore.
