= Kolltveit =

Village in Øygarden Municipality, Norway

- Village
- Interactive map of Kolltveit
- Coordinates: 60.35823°N 5.08222°E
- Country: Norway
- Region: Western Norway
- County: Vestland
- District: Midhordland
- Municipality: Øygarden Municipality
- Elevation: 34 m (112 ft)
- Time zone: UTC+01:00 (CET)
  - Summer (DST): UTC+02:00 (CEST)
- Post Code: 5360 Kolltveit

Kolltveit is a village in Øygarden Municipality in Vestland county, Norway. The village lies on the eastern shore of the island of Sotra, just west of the village of Straume. The island of Bildøyna lies about 100 metres (330 ft) east of the shore in Kolltveit.

National Road 555 reaches Kolltveit via the Kolltveit Tunnel, and intersects with the terminus of County Road 561 in a roundabout before heading south. There is a golf course in the area.
