= Ona, Vestland =

Island in Vestland, Norway

Ona One or Oni
- Interactive map of the island

Geography
- Location: Vestland, Norway
- Coordinates: 60.5545°N 4.8449°E
- Area: 6.8 km^{2} (2.6 sq mi)
- Length: 4.5 km (2.8 mi)
- Width: 2.5 km (1.55 mi)
- Highest elevation: 53 m (174 ft)
- Highest point: Vareidet

Administration
- Norway
- County: Vestland
- Municipality: Øygarden Municipality

Demographics
- Population: 230 (2001)

Ona is an island in Øygarden Municipality in Vestland county, Norway. The 6.8-square-kilometre (2.6 sq mi) island lies in the Øygarden archipelago just north of the island of Blomøyna and south of Alvøyna. The Hjeltefjorden lies east of the island and the North Sea and some smaller islands lie to the west. The southern portion of the island of Ona is dominated by the Kollsnes natural gas processing facility. The island is low, rocky, and barren, with its highest point being the 53-metre (174 ft) tall Vareidet hill.

== See also ==
- List of islands of Norway
