= Landro, Vestland =

Village in Øygarden Municipality, Norway

Landro
- Village
- Interactive map of Landro
- Coordinates: 60.42362°N 4.96662°E
- Country: Norway
- Region: Western Norway
- County: Vestland
- District: Midhordland
- Municipality: Øygarden Municipality
- Elevation: 13 m (43 ft)
- Time zone: UTC+01:00 (CET)
  - Summer (DST): UTC+02:00 (CEST)
- Post Code: 5363 Ågotnes

Landro is a village in Øygarden Municipality in Vestland county, Norway. The village is located in the northern part of the island of Sotra. It lies about halfway between the villages of Ågotnes and Sollsvika. Landro Church is located in this village, serving the northern part of the island.
