= Sekkingstad =

Village in Øygarden Municipality, Norway

- Village
- Interactive map of Sekkingstad
- Coordinates: 60.35474°N 4.98536°E
- Country: Norway
- Region: Western Norway
- County: Vestland
- District: Midhordland
- Municipality: Øygarden Municipality

Area
  - Total: 0.59 km^{2} (0.23 sq mi)
- Elevation: 17 m (56 ft)

Population (2025)
  - Total: 679
  - Density: 1,151/km^{2} (2,980/sq mi)
- Time zone: UTC+01:00 (CET)
  - Summer (DST): UTC+02:00 (CEST)
- Post Code: 5363 Ågotnes

Sekkingstad is a village in Øygarden Municipality in Vestland county, Norway. It is situated on the west side of the island of Sotra. Sekkingstad is the site of the fish factory Vågen Seafood. The 130-metre (430 ft) tall mountain Saufjellet lies just northeast of the village.

The 0.59-square-kilometre (150-acre) village has a population (2025) of 679 and a population density of 1,151 inhabitants per square kilometre (2,980/sq mi).
