= Marianne Bjorøy =

Norwegian politician

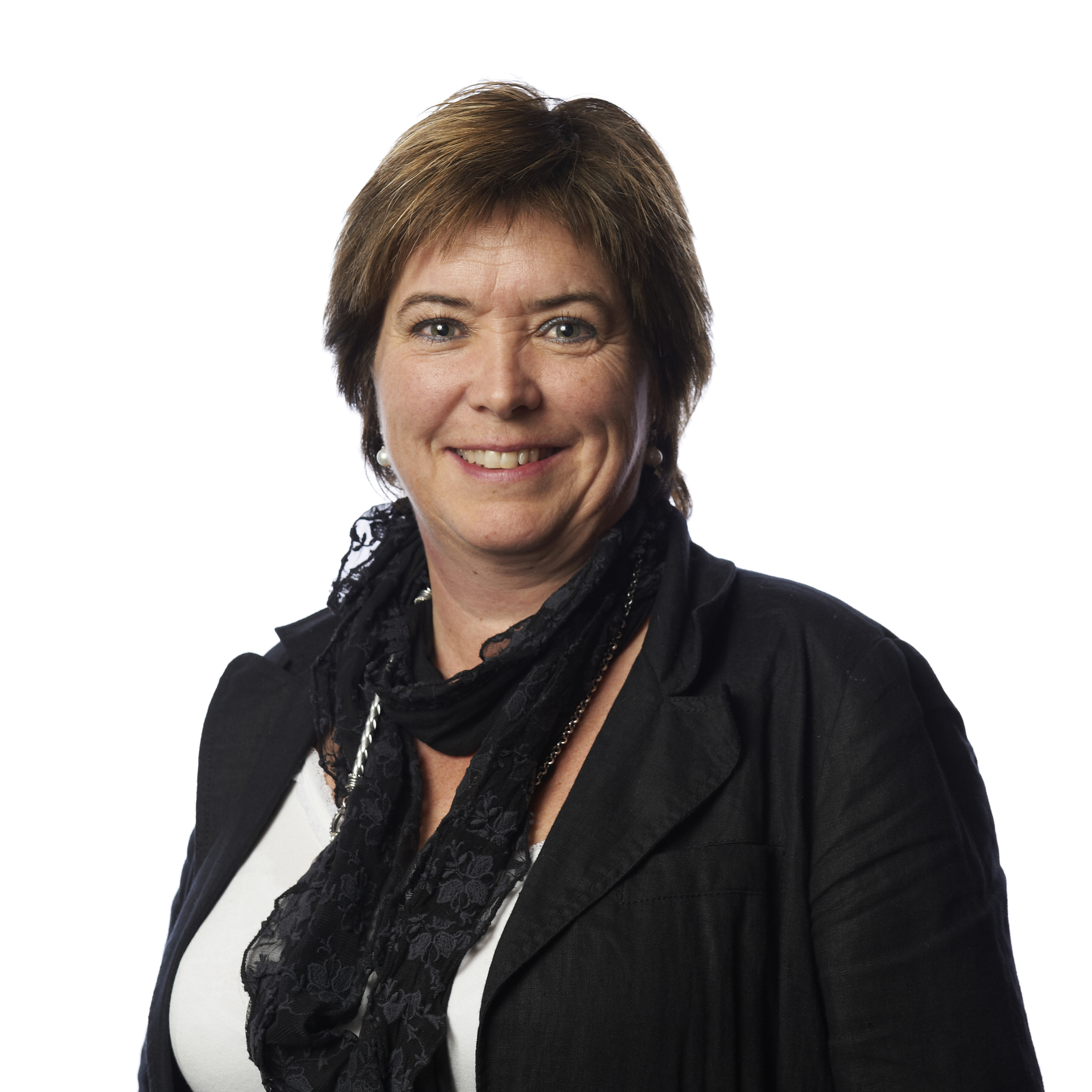
Marianne Sandahl Bjorøy

Marianne Sandahl Bjorøy (born 30 March 1962) is a Norwegian politician for the Labour Party.

She served as a deputy representative to the Parliament of Norway from Hordaland during the term 2013–2017. She became mayor of Fjell Municipality following the 2015 Norwegian local elections.
