= Alvheim =

Village in Øygarden Municipality, Norway

Alvheim Alveim
- Village
- Interactive map of Alvheim
- Coordinates: 60.60213°N 4.80023°E
- Country: Norway
- Region: Western Norway
- County: Vestland
- District: Midhordland
- Municipality: Øygarden Municipality
- Elevation: 3 m (9.8 ft)
- Time zone: UTC+01:00 (CET)
  - Summer (DST): UTC+02:00 (CEST)
- Post Code: 5336 Tjeldstø

Alvheim is a village in Øygarden Municipality in northwestern Vestland county, Norway. It is located on the western side of the coastal island of Alvøyna.
