= Toftarøyna =

Island in Vestland, Norway

Toftarøyna Toftarøy / Toftøya (unofficial)
- Interactive map of the island

Geography
- Location: Vestland, Norway
- Coordinates: 60.1886°N 5.0625°E
- Area: 9.1 km^{2} (3.5 sq mi)
- Length: 5.3 km (3.29 mi)
- Width: 3.2 km (1.99 mi)
- Highest elevation: 84 m (276 ft)
- Highest point: Sælsfjellet

Administration
- Norway
- County: Vestland
- Municipality: Øygarden Municipality

Demographics
- Population: 466 (2019)

Toftarøyna is an island in Øygarden Municipality in Vestland county, Norway. The island is home to 466 residents (as of 2019).

== Geography ==
The 9.1-square-kilometre (3.5 sq mi) island lies just south of the large island of Sotra, along the northern side of the Krossfjorden. The village of Klokkarvik lies about 5 kilometres (3.1 mi) northeast of the island.

The island is connected to Sotra by a bridge on County Road 200. The island has 3 main village areas: Hummelsund (on the south side), Vikso (on the southwest side), and Tofta (on the west side).

== See also ==
- List of islands of Norway
