= Algrøyna =

Island in Øygarden, Norway

Algrøyna Algrøy (unofficial)
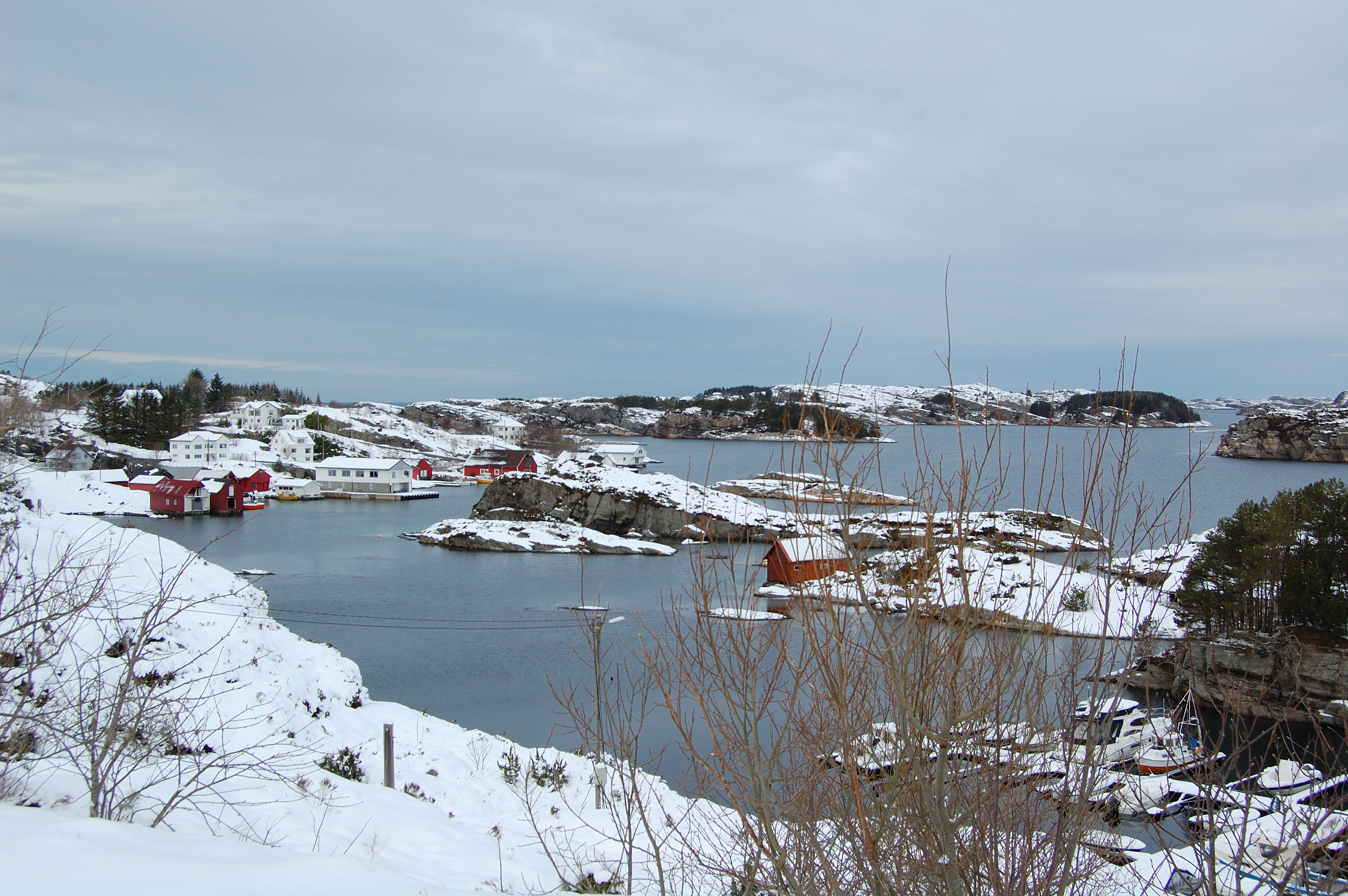
- View of the shoreline of Algrøyna
- Interactive map of the island

Geography
- Location: Vestland, Norway
- Coordinates: 60.3527°N 4.9558°E
- Area: 4.9 km^{2} (1.9 sq mi)
- Length: 3 km (1.9 mi)
- Width: 3 km (1.9 mi)
- Highest elevation: 78 m (256 ft)
- Highest point: Hillefjellet

Administration
- Norway
- County: Vestland
- Municipality: Øygarden Municipality

Demographics
- Population: 386 (2019)

Algrøyna is an island in Øygarden Municipality in Vestland county, Norway. The 4.9-square-kilometre (1.9 sq mi) island lies just west of the large island of Sotra and north of the small island of Lokøyna. There are a series of bridges connecting it to the island of Sotra, which in turn is connected to the mainland. The highest point on the island is the 78-metre (256 ft) tall mountain Hillefjellet. Almost all the 386 residents (in 2019) of the island live along the northern shore, in a village area that is referred to as Algrøyna.

== See also ==
- List of islands of Norway
