= Foldnes =

Village in Øygarden Municipality, Norway

- Village
- Interactive map of Foldnes
- Coordinates: 60.37636°N 5.10293°E
- Country: Norway
- Region: Western Norway
- County: Vestland
- District: Midhordland
- Municipality: Øygarden Municipality
- Elevation: 38 m (125 ft)
- Time zone: UTC+01:00 (CET)
  - Summer (DST): UTC+02:00 (CEST)
- Post Code: 5354 Straume

Foldnes is a village in Øygarden Municipality in Vestland county, Norway. The village is located on the northwestern shore of the island of Litlesotra, just north of the village of Straume. The Foldnes Church in this village was founded in 2001 and serves the inhabitants on the island of Litlesotra.
