= Øygarden Municipality =

Municipality in Vestland, Norway

Øygarden Municipality Øygarden kommune
- Municipality
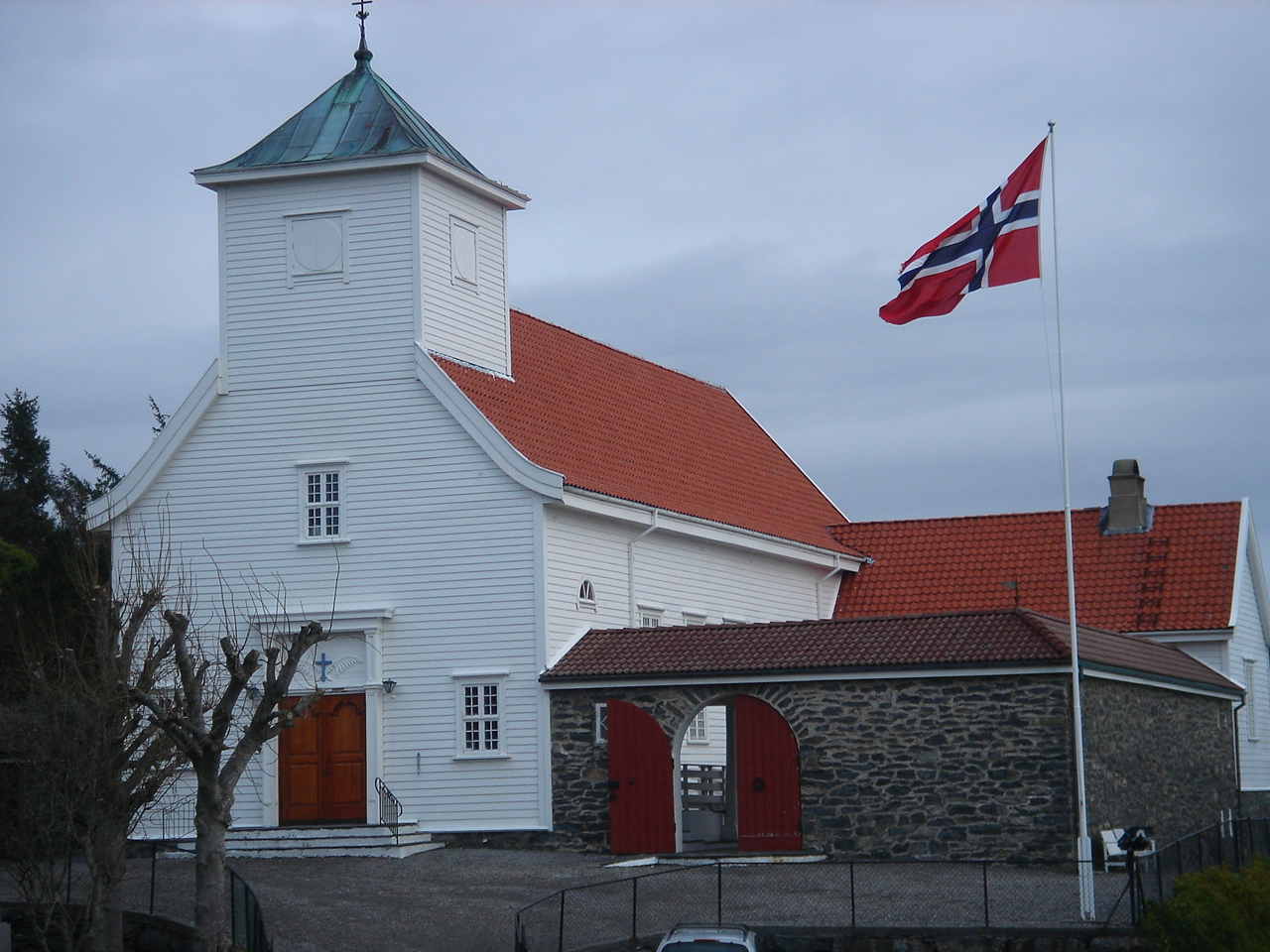
- View of the local Blomvåg Church

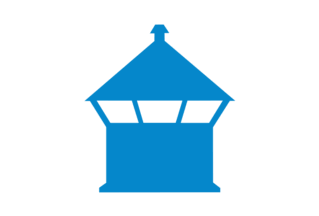
- Flag Coat of arms

- Vestland within Norway

- Øygarden within Vestland
- Coordinates: 60°36′39″N 04°49′29″E
- Country: Norway
- County: Vestland
- District: Midhordland
- Established: 1 Jan 1964
  - Preceded by: Hjelme Municipality and Herdla Municipality
- Administrative centre: Straume

Government
  - Mayor (2019): Tom Georg Indrevik (H)

Area
  - Total: 314.52 km^{2} (121.44 sq mi)
  - Land: 300.38 km^{2} (115.98 sq mi)
  - Water: 14.14 km^{2} (5.46 sq mi) 4.5%
  - Rank: #260 in Norway
- Highest elevation: 340.85 m (1,118.3 ft)

Population (2025)
  - Total: 40,105
  - Rank: #27 in Norway
  - Density: 127.5/km^{2} (330/sq mi)
  - Change (10 years): ▲ +13%
- Demonym: Øygarding

Official language
  - Norwegian form: Nynorsk
- Time zone: UTC+01:00 (CET)
  - Summer (DST): UTC+02:00 (CEST)
- ISO 3166 code: NO-4626
- Website: Official website

Øygarden is a municipality in Vestland county, Norway. It is an island municipality located in the traditional district of Midhordland, stretching along the west coast of the county. The village of Straume is the administrative centre of the municipality. Other villages in the municipality include Alvheim, Blomvåg, Vikavågen, Ågotnes, Fjell, Foldnes, Knappskog, Knarrvika, Kolltveit, Landro, Sekkingstad, Skogsvågen, Klokkarvik, Tælavåg, Kausland, and Hammarsland. The municipality consists of a chain of islands to the north and west of the city of Bergen. Øygarden is connected to the mainland by a series of bridges and a single road running across the islands.

The 314.52-square-kilometre (121.44 sq mi) municipality is the 260th largest by area out of the 357 municipalities in Norway. Øygarden Municipality is the 27th most populous municipality in Norway with a population of 40,105. The municipality's population density is 127.5 inhabitants per square kilometre (330/sq mi) and its population has increased by 13% over the previous 10-year period.

== General information ==
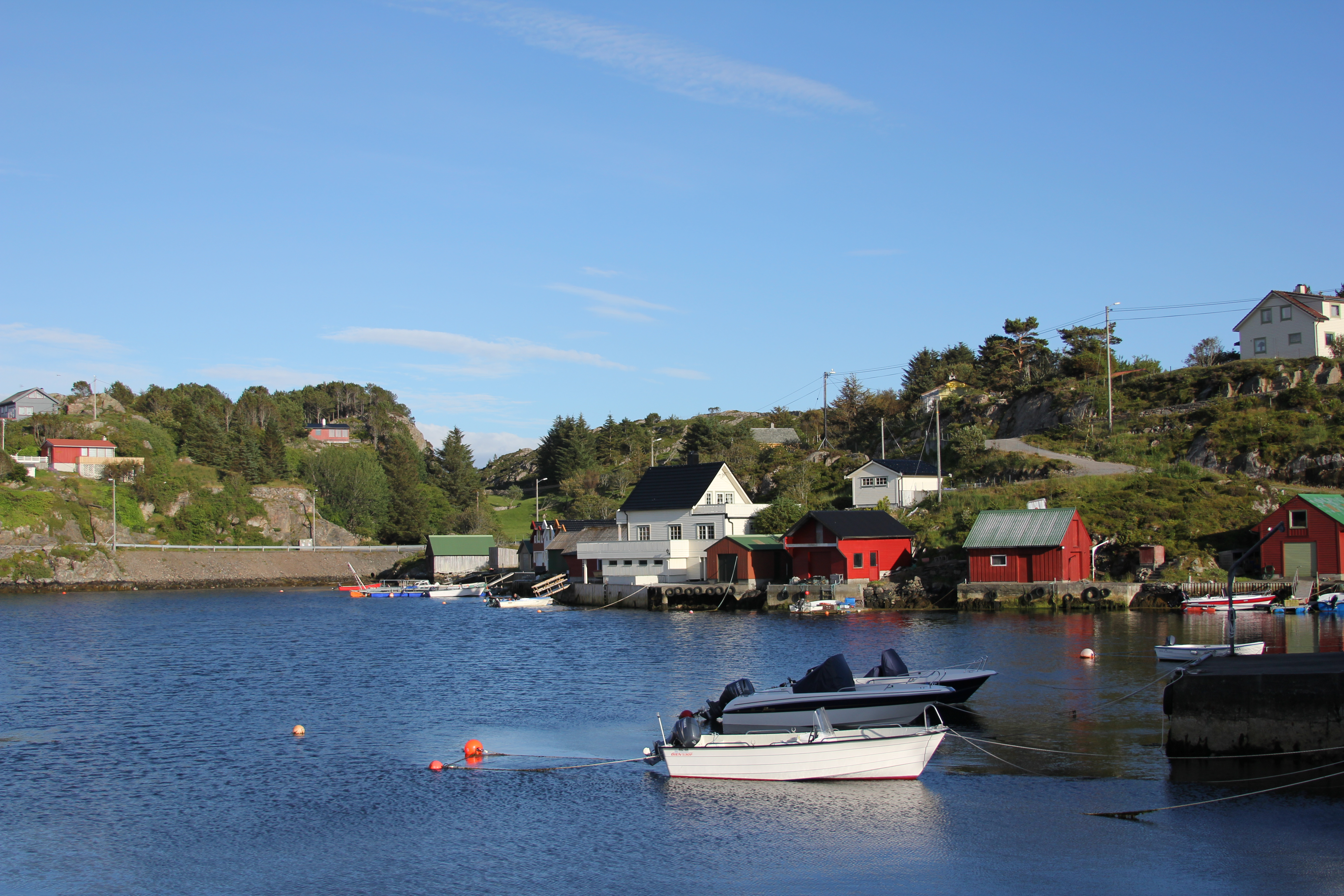
View of Hellesundet

The municipality of Øygarden was established on 1 January 1964. It was created by a merger that was set in motion by the Schei Committee. The newly created Øygarden Municipality was made up of all of the old Hjelme Municipality (population: 956) and almost all of the old Herdla Municipality (population: 2131) that was located west of the Hjeltefjorden (except for the islands of Turøyna and Misje which were transferred from Herdla Municipality to the neighboring Fjell Municipality).

On 1 January 2020, there was a large municipal merger including three neighboring municipalities. Fjell Municipality, Sund Municipality, and Øygarden Municipality were merged into a new, much larger Øygarden Municipality.

Historically, this municipality was part of the old Hordaland county. On 1 January 2020, the municipality became a part of the newly-formed Vestland county (after Hordaland and Sogn og Fjordane counties were merged).

=== Administrative centre ===
The administrative centre of Øygarden Municipality has changed three times over the years. From 1964 until 2009, it was located at the village of Tjeldstø. From 2009 through 2019, it was located in the village of Rong. In 2020, the administrative centre was moved to the large village of Straume after the municipal merger with Fjell Municipality and Sund Municipality.

=== Name ===
The municipality of Øygarden was created in 1964 and the name was created at the same time. The name is the finite form of øygard which means "island group" or more specifically "row (fence) of islands". The first element is identical to the word øy which means "island". The last element is garden which means "the farm".

=== Coat of arms ===
Arms from 1966 until 2020

Arms since 2020

The original coat of arms was granted in 1966, shortly after the establishment of the municipality and they were in use until 2020. The blazon was "Azure, a fess engrailed argent below a cairn sable and argent". This means the arms have a blue field (background) and the charge is a reference sea cairn sitting on an islet rising above a sea wave. The wave and a small stripe on the buoy both have a tincture of argent which means it is commonly colored white, but if it is made out of metal, then silver is used. The municipality consisted of larger and smaller islands and islets. The design was chosen to symbolize the importance of fishing and sea navigation for the area. Hence the importance of sea cairns, buoys and lighthouses for safety in the municipality. The arms were designed by Magnus Hardeland. The municipal flag has the same design as the coat of arms.

A new coat of arms was adopted in 2019 for use starting on 1 January 2020 after a municipal merger where Sund, Fjell, and Øygarden merged to form a new Øygarden Municipality. The new municipality decided to use the coat of arms for the old Sund Municipality which had originally been granted to that municipality on 23 March 1988. The official blazon is "Argent, a lighthouse couped azure" (Norwegian: På sølv grunn ei blå fyrlykt). This means the arms have a field (background) has a tincture of argent which means it is commonly colored white, but if it is made out of metal, then silver is used. The charge is a lighthouse. The lighthouse reflects the municipality's close ties to the sea, and the white colour represents the light emitted from the lighthouse. The arms were designed by Even Jarl Skoglund. The municipal flag has the same design as the coat of arms.

=== Churches ===
The Church of Norway has four parishes (sokn) within Øygarden Municipality. It is part of the Vesthordland prosti (deanery) in the Diocese of Bjørgvin.

Churches in Øygarden Municipality
Parish (sokn)	Church name	Location	Year built
Blomvåg	Blomvåg Church	Blomvåg	1931
Fjell	Fjell Church	Fjell	1874
Fjell	Foldnes Church	Foldnes	2001
Fjell	Landro Church	Landro	1977
Hjelme	Hjelme Church	Seløyna	1971
Hjelme	Old Hjelme Church	Seløyna	1875
Sund	Sund Church	Klokkarvik	1997
Sund	Kausland Church	Kausland	1881

== Geography ==
The municipality is made up of many islands. The main islands are (from north to south): Seløyna, Alvøyna, Ona, Blomøyna, Rongøyna, Toftøyna, Misje, Turøyna, Sotra, Litlesotra, Geitanger, Bildøyna, Bjorøyna, Algrøyna, Lokøyna, Syltøyna, Toftarøyna, Lerøyna, Bjelkarøyna, Tyssøyna, Stora Risøyna, Stora Vardøyna, Golta, and Vikso. Besides these larger islands, the municipality consists of hundreds small islands, islets, and reefs. Some of the other islands include Hernar in the far north and Førehjelmo.

The landscape is low and relatively flat. The highest point in the municipality is the 340.85-metre (1,118.3 ft) tall mountain Liatårnet on the island of Sotra. Several smaller lakes are located on the islands. The west side of the islands is an important nesting site for birds. The North Sea lies to the west of the islands and the Hjeltefjorden.

Tjeldstø Marka on Alvøyna has been a protected nature reserve since 1995. It is one of the largest wetland reserves in Hordaland. The Ormhilleren friluftsområde is another nature reserve surrounding the Rongesundet strait.

== Population ==
Historical population
Year	1964	1970	1980	1990	2000	2010	2020	2023
Pop.	3,087	2,835	2,534	3,158	3,623	4,267	38,316	39,368
±%	—	−8.2%	−10.6%	+24.6%	+14.7%	+17.8%	+798.0%	+2.7%
Note: The municipal borders were changed in 2020, causing a significant change in the population. Source: Statistics Norway

== Government ==
Øygarden Municipality is responsible for primary education (through 10th grade), outpatient health services, senior citizen services, welfare and other social services, zoning, economic development, and municipal roads and utilities. The municipality is governed by a municipal council of directly elected representatives. The mayor is indirectly elected by a vote of the municipal council. The municipality is under the jurisdiction of the Hordaland District Court and the Gulating Court of Appeal.

=== Municipal council ===
The municipal council (Kommunestyre) of Øygarden Municipality is made up of 45 representatives that are elected to four-year terms. The tables below show the current and historical composition of the council by political party.

Øygarden kommunestyre 2023–2027
Party name (in Nynorsk)	Number of representatives
Labour Party (Arbeidarpartiet)	7
Progress Party (Framstegspartiet)	7
Green Party (Miljøpartiet Dei Grøne)	1
Conservative Party (Høgre)	14
Industry and Business Party (Industri‑ og Næringspartiet)	4
Christian Democratic Party (Kristeleg Folkeparti)	3
Pensioners' Party (Pensjonistpartiet)	1
Red Party (Raudt)	1
Centre Party (Senterpartiet)	1
Socialist Left Party (Sosialistisk Venstreparti)	2
Liberal Party (Venstre)	1
Sotra List (Sotralista)	3
Total number of members:	45

Øygarden kommunestyre 2019–2023
Party name (in Nynorsk)	Number of representatives
Labour Party (Arbeidarpartiet)	8
People's Action No to More Road Tolls (Folkeaksjonen nei til meir bompengar)	4
Progress Party (Framstegspartiet)	4
Green Party (Miljøpartiet Dei Grøne)	2
Conservative Party (Høgre)	10
Christian Democratic Party (Kristeleg Folkeparti)	4
Red Party (Raudt)	1
Centre Party (Senterpartiet)	4
Socialist Left Party (Sosialistisk Venstreparti)	2
Liberal Party (Venstre)	1
Sotra List (Sotralista)	5
Total number of members:	45
Note: On 1 January 2020, Fjell Municipality and Sund Municipality were merged into Øygarden Municipality.

Øygarden kommunestyre 2015–2019
Party name (in Nynorsk)	Number of representatives
Labour Party (Arbeidarpartiet)	6
Progress Party (Framstegspartiet)	2
Conservative Party (Høgre)	3
Christian Democratic Party (Kristeleg Folkeparti)	2
Socialist Left Party (Sosialistisk Venstreparti)	1
Cross-party Election List for Øygarden (Tverrpolitisk valliste for Øygarden)	9
Total number of members:	23

Øygarden kommunestyre 2011–2015
Party name (in Nynorsk)	Number of representatives
Labour Party (Arbeidarpartiet)	7
Progress Party (Framstegspartiet)	2
Conservative Party (Høgre)	4
Christian Democratic Party (Kristeleg Folkeparti)	1
Socialist Left Party (Sosialistisk Venstreparti)	1
Cross-party Election List for Øygarden (Tverrpolitisk valliste for Øygarden)	9
Total number of members:	23

Øygarden kommunestyre 2007–2011
Party name (in Nynorsk)	Number of representatives
Labour Party (Arbeidarpartiet)	7
Progress Party (Framstegspartiet)	3
Christian Democratic Party (Kristeleg Folkeparti)	1
Socialist Left Party (Sosialistisk Venstreparti)	1
Joint List(s) of Non-Socialist Parties (Borgarlege Felleslister)	1
Cross-party Election List for Øygarden (Tverrpolitisk valliste for Øygarden)	10
Total number of members:	23

Øygarden kommunestyre 2003–2007
Party name (in Nynorsk)	Number of representatives
Labour Party (Arbeidarpartiet)	7
Progress Party (Framstegspartiet)	2
Christian Democratic Party (Kristeleg Folkeparti)	2
Joint List(s) of Non-Socialist Parties (Borgarlege Felleslister)	2
Cross-party Election List for Øygarden (Tverrpolitisk valliste for Øygarden)	10
Total number of members:	23

Øygarden kommunestyre 1999–2003
Party name (in Nynorsk)	Number of representatives
Labour Party (Arbeidarpartiet)	5
Christian Democratic Party (Kristeleg Folkeparti)	2
Joint List(s) of Non-Socialist Parties (Borgarlege Felleslister)	4
Cross-party Election List for Øygarden (Tverrpolitisk valliste for Øygarden)	12
Total number of members:	23

Øygarden kommunestyre 1995–1999
Party name (in Nynorsk)	Number of representatives
Labour Party (Arbeidarpartiet)	7
Christian Democratic Party (Kristeleg Folkeparti)	2
Joint List(s) of Non-Socialist Parties (Borgarlege Felleslister)	3
Cross-party Election List for Øygarden (Tverrpolitisk valliste for Øygarden)	11
Total number of members:	23

Øygarden kommunestyre 1991–1995
Party name (in Nynorsk)	Number of representatives
Labour Party (Arbeidarpartiet)	9
Christian Democratic Party (Kristeleg Folkeparti)	5
Socialist Left Party (Sosialistisk Venstreparti)	1
Joint List(s) of Non-Socialist Parties (Borgarlege Felleslister)	3
Election list for South Øygarden (Valliste for Søre Øygarden)	5
Total number of members:	23

Øygarden kommunestyre 1987–1991
Party name (in Nynorsk)	Number of representatives
Labour Party (Arbeidarpartiet)	5
Conservative Party (Høgre)	6
Socialist Left Party (Sosialistisk Venstreparti)	1
Liberal Party (Venstre)	1
Joint List(s) of Non-Socialist Parties (Borgarlege Felleslister)	3
Election list for Blomvåg parish (Vallista for Blomvåg sokn)	7
Total number of members:	23

Øygarden kommunestyre 1983–1987
Party name (in Nynorsk)	Number of representatives
Labour Party (Arbeidarpartiet)	4
Conservative Party (Høgre)	2
Christian Democratic Party (Kristeleg Folkeparti)	7
Election list for Blomvåg parish (Vallista for Blomvåg sokn)	6
Common list (Samlingslista)	4
Total number of members:	23

Øygarden kommunestyre 1979–1983
Party name (in Nynorsk)	Number of representatives
Labour Party (Arbeidarpartiet)	3
Conservative Party (Høgre)	6
Christian Democratic Party (Kristeleg Folkeparti)	7
Election list for Blomvåg parish (Vallista for Blomvåg sokn)	3
Common list (Samlingslista)	4
Total number of members:	23

Øygarden kommunestyre 1975–1979
Party name (in Nynorsk)	Number of representatives
Labour Party (Arbeidarpartiet)	3
Christian Democratic Party (Kristeleg Folkeparti)	4
Blomvåg parish list (Blomvåg Sokn liste)	10
Common list (Samlingslista)	6
Total number of members:	23

Øygarden kommunestyre 1971–1975
Party name (in Nynorsk)	Number of representatives
Labour Party (Arbeidarpartiet)	1
Centre Party (Senterpartiet)	8
Liberal Party (Venstre)	3
Local List(s) (Lokale lister)	11
Total number of members:	23

Øygarden kommunestyre 1967–1971
Party name (in Nynorsk)	Number of representatives
Local List(s) (Lokale lister)	23
Total number of members:	23

Øygarden kommunestyre 1963–1967
Party name (in Nynorsk)	Number of representatives
Local List(s) (Lokale lister)	23
Total number of members:	23

=== Mayors ===
The mayor (Nynorsk: ordførar) of Øygarden Municipality is the political leader of the municipality and the chairperson of the municipal council. Here is a list of people who have held this position:

- 1964–1967: Jens Christian Rong (LL)
- 1968–1971: Karl J. Hellesøy (LL)
- 1972–1975: Alf Magnus Sæle (LL)
- 1976–1979: Kjell Alvheim (LL)
- 1980–1981: Rolv Svein Rougnø (H)
- 1982–1983: Ottar Vik (KrF)
- 1984–1985: Rolv Svein Rougnø (H)
- 1986–1987: Kjell Alvheim (LL)
- 1988–1989: Ottar Vik (KrF)
- 1990–1995: Otto Harkestad (Ap)
- 1995–1999: Rolv Svein Rougnø (H)
- 2000–2011: Olav Martin Vik (LL)
- 2011–2014: Otto Harkestad (Ap)
- 2015–2015: Åse Gunn Husebø (Ap)
- 2015–2019: Børge Haugetun (LL)
- 2019–present: Tom Georg Indrevik (H)

== Economy ==
The municipality has a significant aquaculture industry, primarily with salmon, cod, and shellfish. Agriculture is limited in the municipality and is largely a part-time occupation, so most farmers have another profession too. Agriculture in Øygarden is dominated by raising livestock (sheep, cattle, and chickens).

Since 1988, petroleum activities have become a major industry in Øygarden. The transportation of oil from the Oseberg oil field through a pipeline to Sture on Alvøyna was the start of the oil boom. In 1996, a natural gas processing plant at Kollsnes on the island of Ona was completed.

In 2024, the company Norsk Kjernekraft signed an agreement with a landowner in the municipality to purchase 250 acres (100 ha), to accommodate up to five Small modular reactor units.

== Notable people ==
- Martin Rasmussen Hjelmen (1904 in Øygarden – 1944), sailor and communist activist
- John Alvheim (1930 in Øygarden – 2005), nurse anaesthetist, aid worker, and politician
- Lars Arne Nilsen (born 1964 in Sotra), football manager
- Alexander Dale Oen (1985 in Øygarden – 2012), swimmer on the Norwegian national team and silver medallist at the 2008 Summer Olympics

== Gallery ==
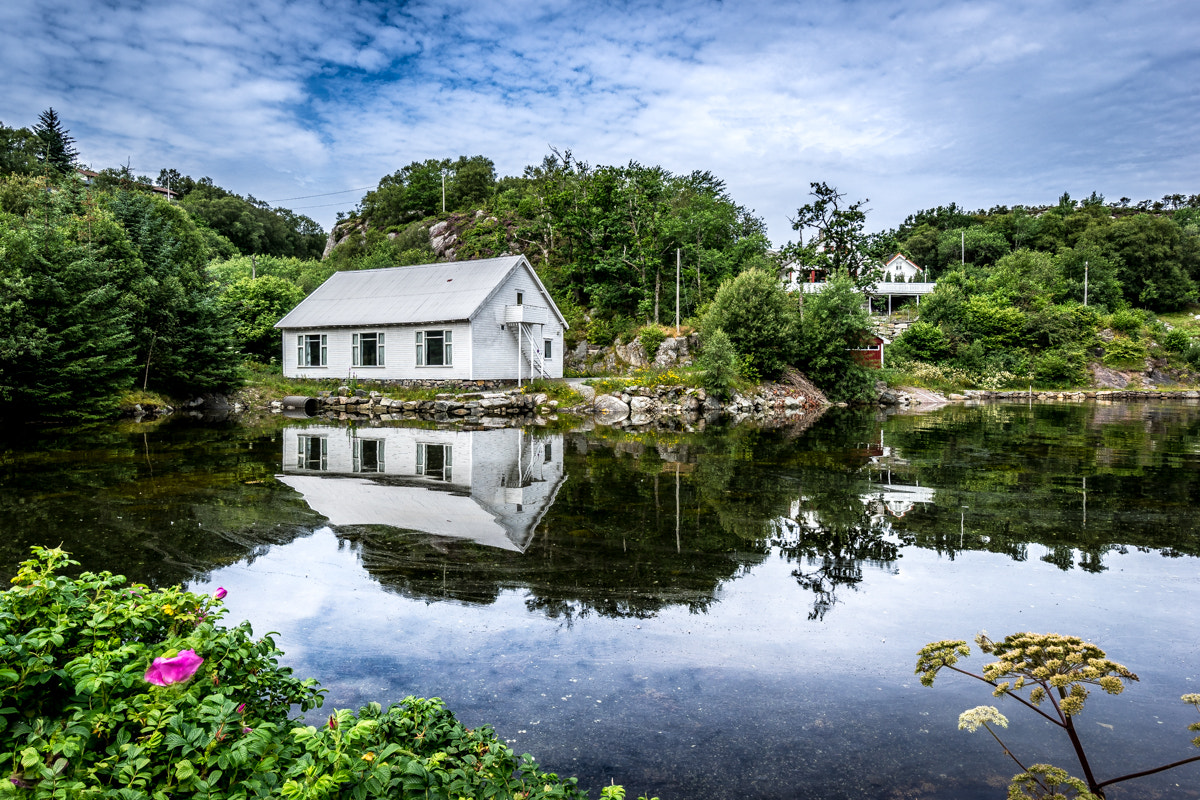
Spjeld Storelva

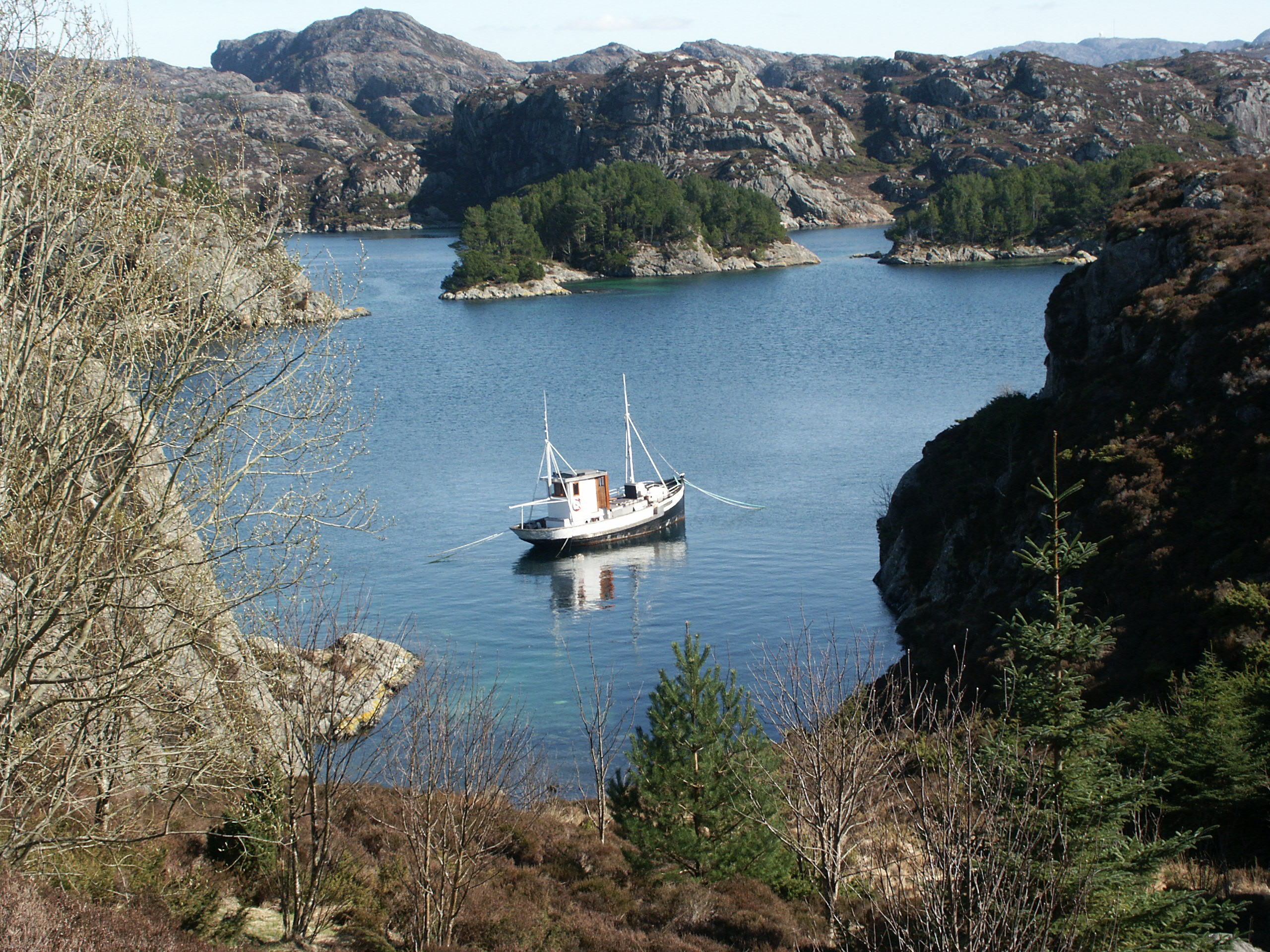
Fjord landscape, Sotra

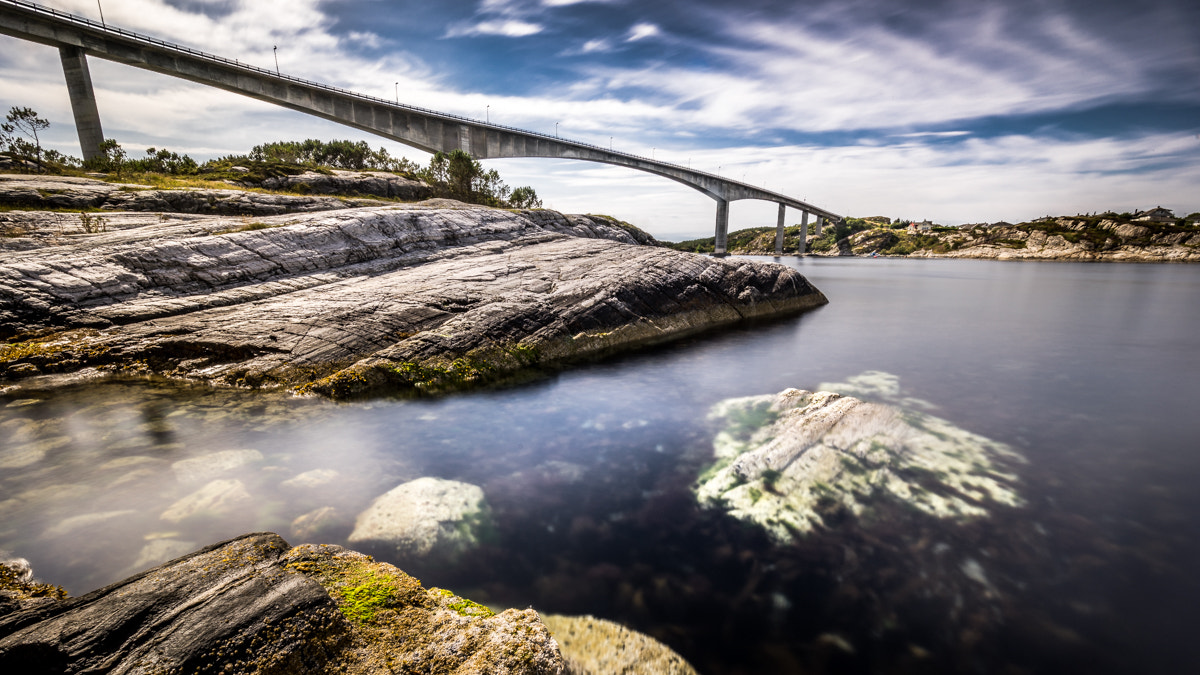
Nordra Straumsundet

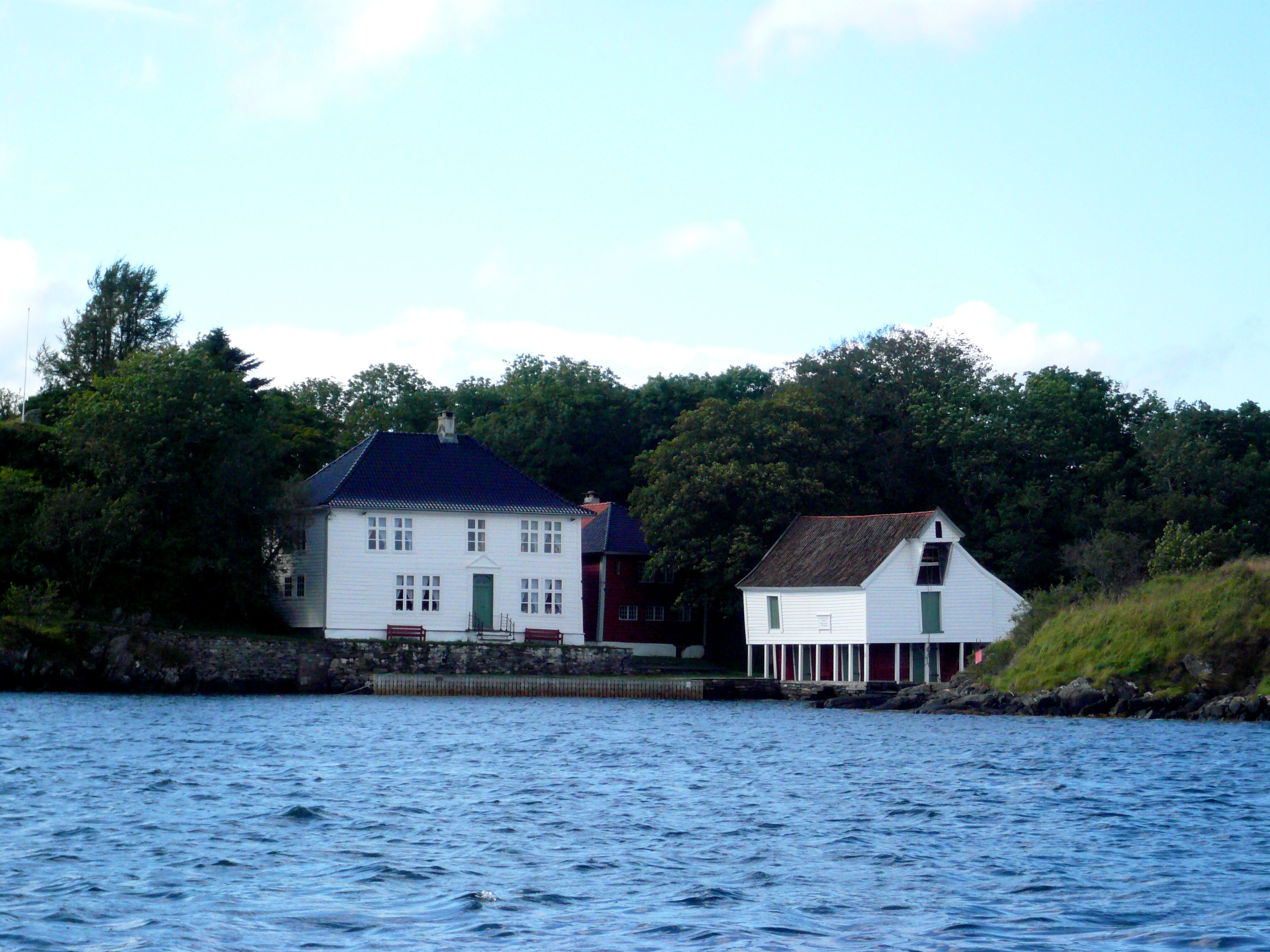
Bukken
