= Foldnes Church =

Church in Vestland, Norway

- Foldnes kyrkje
- Foldnes Church
- 60°22′03″N 5°07′36″E
- Location: Øygarden Municipality, Vestland
- Country: Norway
- Denomination: Church of Norway
- Churchmanship: Evangelical Lutheran

History
- Status: Parish church
- Founded: 2001
- Consecrated: 22 April 2001

Architecture
- Functional status: Active
- Architect: Kolbjørn Jensen
- Architectural type: Rectangular
- Completed: 2001 (25 years ago)

Specifications
- Capacity: 700
- Materials: Wood and Leca

Administration
- Diocese: Bjørgvin bispedømme
- Deanery: Vesthordland prosti
- Parish: Fjell
- Norwegian Cultural Heritage Site
- Type: Church
- Status: Listed by municipality
- ID: 269249

Foldnes Church (Norwegian: Foldnes kyrkje) is a parish church of the Church of Norway in Øygarden Municipality in Vestland county, Norway. It is located in the village of Foldnes, just north of the larger village of Straume, on the island of Litlesotra. It is one of the three churches for the Fjell parish which is part of the Vesthordland prosti (deanery) in the Diocese of Bjørgvin. The modern-looking wood-and-leca church was built in a rectangular design in 2001 using plans drawn up by the architect Kolbjørn Jensen. The church seats about 700 people.

== History ==
The new church at Foldnes was established in 2001. Planning for the church began in the 1990s. Jensen, from the firm architects' Signatur arkitekter, was hired to design the building. The church, consecrated on 22 April 2001, has been awarded a couple of architectural prizes: Fjell municipality's building prize in 2002 and the Bergen area masonry prize in 2003. A cemetery for the church was built about 200 metres (660 ft) east of the church in 2012-2013.

== See also ==
- List of churches in Bjørgvin
