= Lokøyna =

Island in Vestland, Norway

- Interactive map of Lokøyna

Geography
- Location: Vestland, Norway
- Coordinates: 60.3304°N 4.9656°E
- Area: 2.5 km^{2} (0.97 sq mi)
- Length: 2 km (1.2 mi)
- Width: 1.75 km (1.087 mi)
- Highest elevation: 68 m (223 ft)
- Highest point: Storafjellet

Administration
- Norway
- County: Vestland
- Municipality: Øygarden Municipality

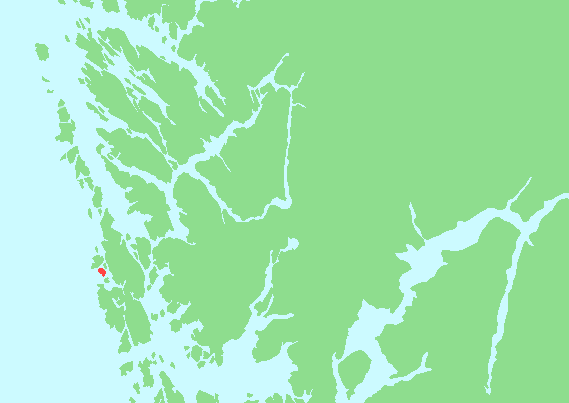
Lokøy, Hordaland, Norway

Lokøyna is an island in Øygarden Municipality in Vestland county, Norway. The 2.5-square-kilometre (0.97 sq mi) lies about 20 kilometres (12 mi) west of the centre of the city of Bergen. It is located in a large archipelago and sits just south of the island of Algrøyna, north of Syltøyna, and west of the large island of Sotra.

== See also ==
- List of islands of Norway
