= Blomvåg Church =

Church in Vestland, Norway

- Blomvåg kyrkje
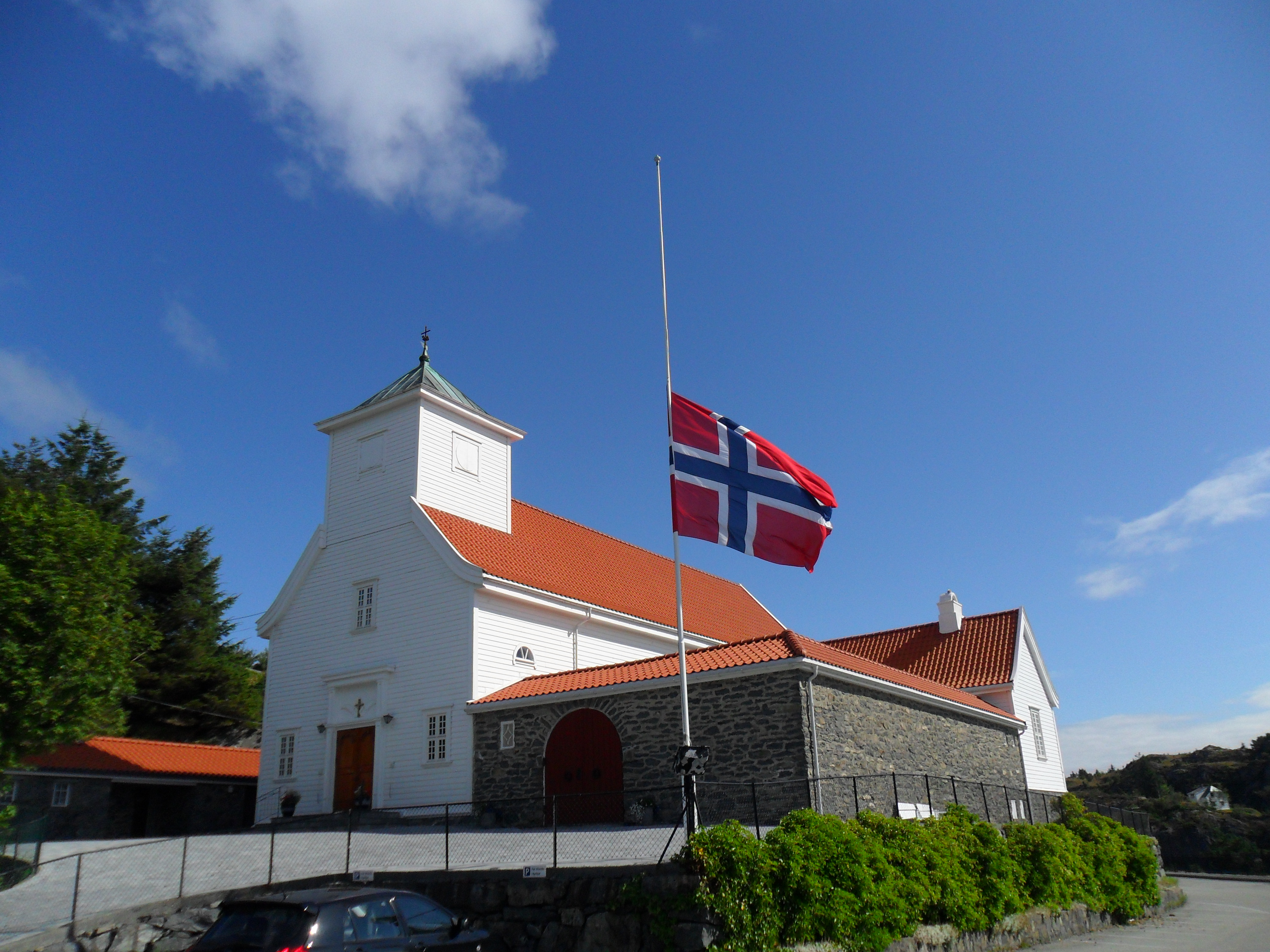
- View of the church
- Blomvåg Church
- 60°31′49″N 4°52′38″E
- Location: Øygarden Municipality, Vestland
- Country: Norway
- Denomination: Church of Norway
- Churchmanship: Evangelical Lutheran

History
- Former name: Blomvåg kapell
- Status: Parish church
- Founded: 1931
- Consecrated: 25 Nov 1931

Architecture
- Functional status: Active
- Architect: Carl Berner
- Architectural type: Long church
- Completed: 1931 (95 years ago)

Specifications
- Capacity: 300
- Materials: Wood

Administration
- Diocese: Bjørgvin bispedømme
- Deanery: Vesthordland prosti
- Parish: Hjelme og Blomvåg
- Norwegian Cultural Heritage Site
- Type: Church
- Status: Listed
- ID: 83916

Blomvåg Church (Norwegian: Blomvåg kyrkje) is a parish church of the Church of Norway in Øygarden Municipality in Vestland county, Norway. It is located in the village of Blomvåg on the island of Blomøyna. It is one of the three churches in the Hjelme og Blomvåg parish which is part of the Vesthordland prosti (deanery) in the Diocese of Bjørgvin. The white, wood and stone church was built in a long church design in 1931 using plans drawn up by the architect Carl Berner. The church seats about 300 people.

== History ==
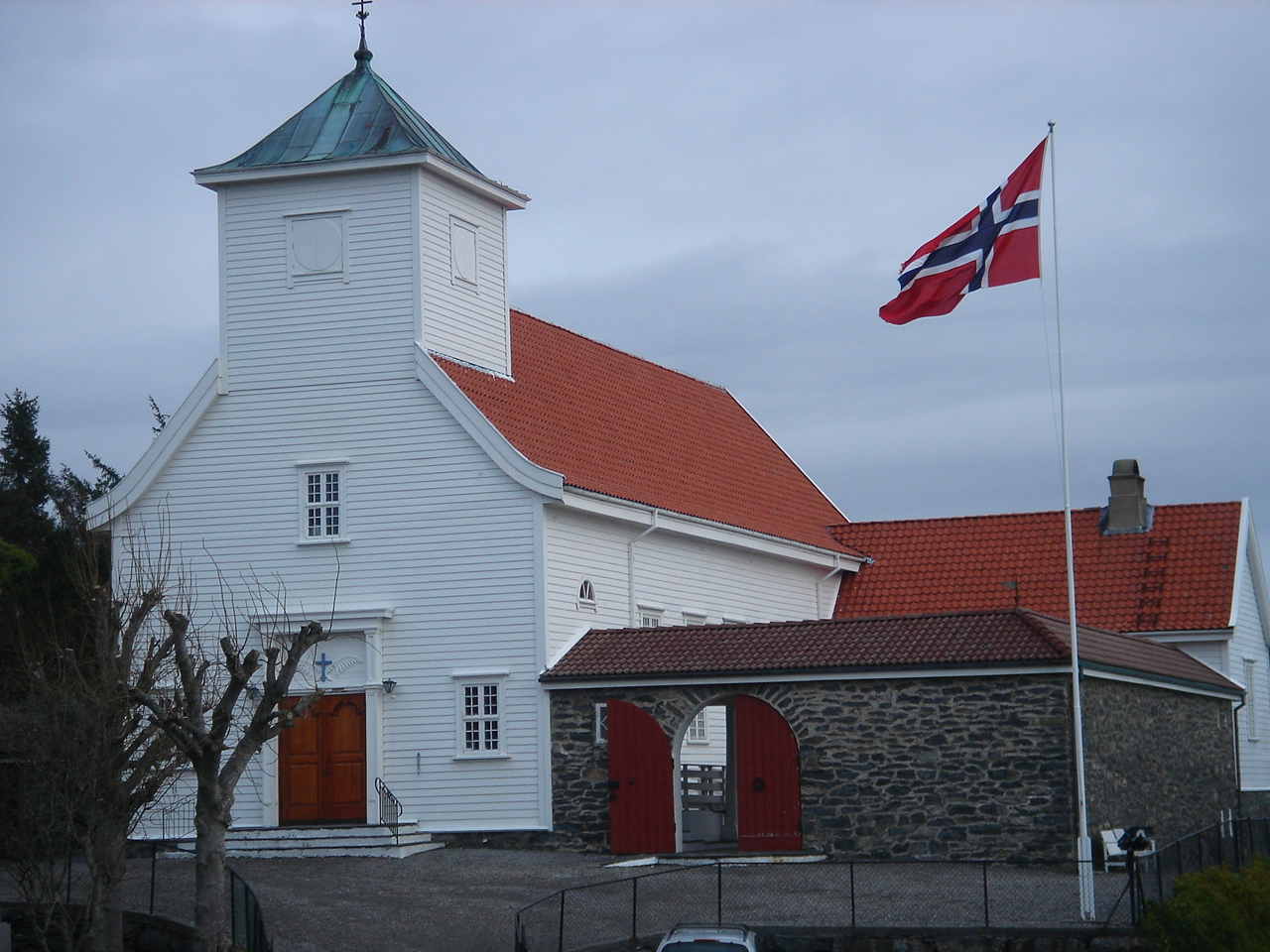
View of the church

In 1930, Ingwald Nielsen gave funds for the construction of a chapel at Blomvåg in exchange for the municipality providing the land, road, and foundation wall. The deal was agreed to and a permit issued on 5 December 1930. The chapel was designed by Carl Berner. The foundation stone was laid on 29 April 1931 and the work was completed in just over six months during 1931. Unfortunately, Nielsen died in June 1931, so he never got to see the finished chapel. The chapel was built with a nave and a chancel on the east end of the nave. To the south of the chancel, lies a large extension that holds a meeting room, sacristy, bathrooms, and a hallway. A rectangular atrium surrounded by a stone wall lies between the nave and the extension to the south. This atrium area is called the Borggården. The new chapel was titled Blomvåg Chapel and it was consecrated on 25 November 1931. Later, the chapel was upgraded to the status of parish church and renamed Blomvåg Church. In the early 1970s, a new sacristy was built perpendicular to the north wall of the choir.

== See also ==
- List of churches in Bjørgvin
