= Blomvåg =

Village in Øygarden Municipality, Norway

- Village
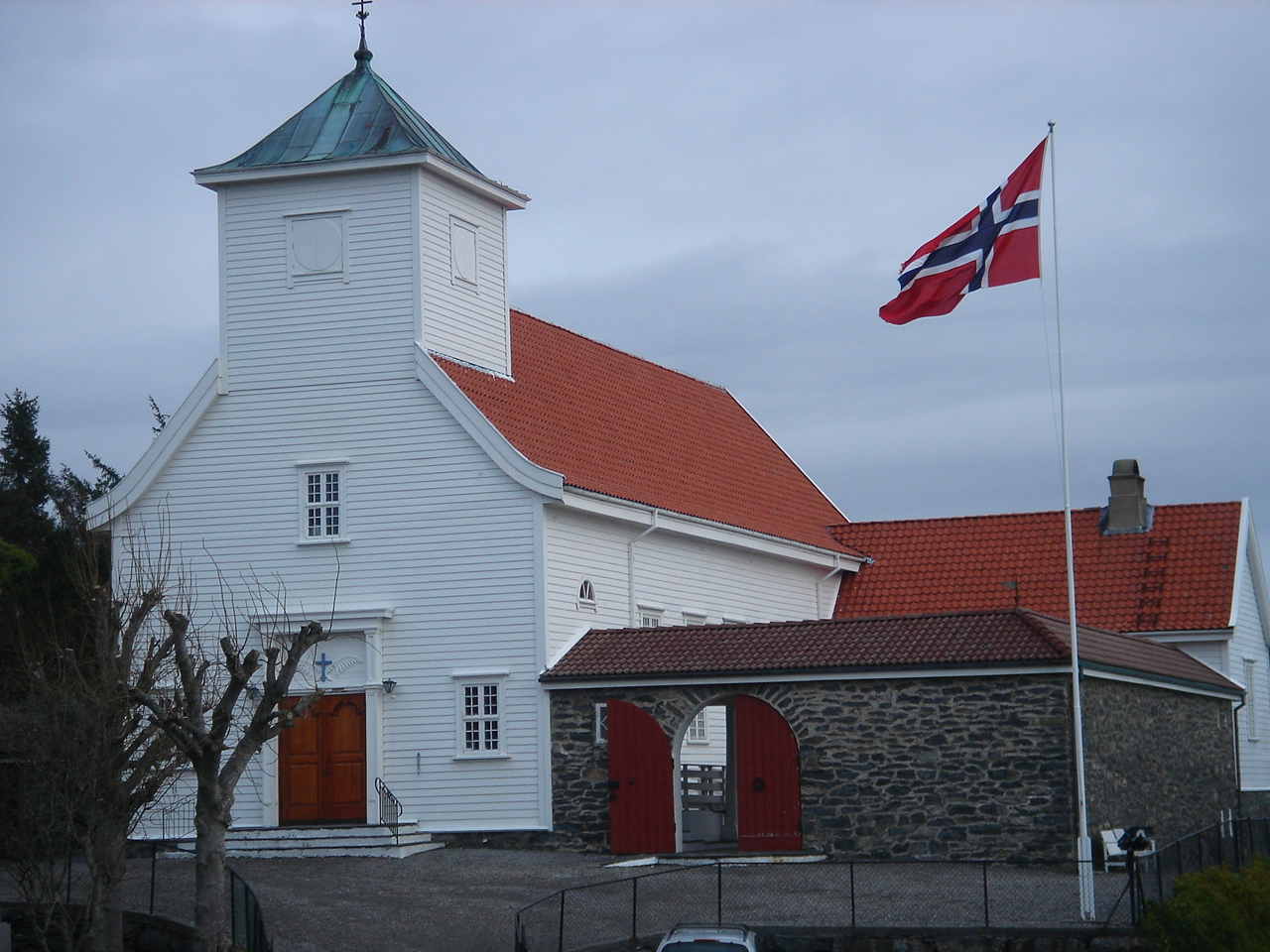
- View of the village
- Interactive map of Blomvåg
- Coordinates: 60.52984°N 4.87588°E
- Country: Norway
- Region: Western Norway
- County: Vestland
- District: Midhordland
- Municipality: Øygarden Municipality

Area
  - Total: 0.72 km^{2} (0.28 sq mi)
- Elevation: 15 m (49 ft)

Population (2025)
  - Total: 533
  - Density: 740/km^{2} (1,900/sq mi)
- Time zone: UTC+01:00 (CET)
  - Summer (DST): UTC+02:00 (CEST)
- Post Code: 5337 Rong

Blomvåg is a village in Øygarden Municipality in Vestland county, Norway. The village is located in the central part of the island of Blomøyna, surrounding inner part of the Blomvågen fjord. The Blomvåg Church was built in this village in 1931. The economy is based on the fishing industry, and historically it was also a whaling port.

The 0.72-square-kilometre (180-acre) village has a population (2025) of 533 and a population density of 740 inhabitants per square kilometre (1,900/sq mi).
