= Rongøyna =

Island in Vestland, Norway

Rongøyna Rongøy (unofficial)
- Interactive map of the island

Geography
- Location: Vestland, Norway
- Coordinates: 60.5083°N 4.9175°E
- Area: 2.7 km^{2} (1.0 sq mi)
- Length: 2.8 km (1.74 mi)
- Width: 1.4 km (0.87 mi)
- Highest elevation: 48 m (157 ft)
- Highest point: Medarseta

Administration
- Norway
- County: Vestland
- Municipality: Øygarden Municipality

Demographics
- Population: 1,303 (2017)

Rongøyna is an island in Øygarden Municipality in northwestern Vestland county, Norway. It is situated in the Øygarden archipelago, about 24 kilometres (15 mi) by air northwest of the city of Bergen.

== Geography ==
The 2.7-square-kilometre (1.0 sq mi) island is located in the Øygarden archipelago, north of the island of Toftøyna, east of the island of Ono, and south of the island of Blomøyna. The village of Rong covers the majority of the island. The island is connected to the island of Toftøyna via the Rongesundet Bridge, which crosses the Rongesundet strait and there is a short bridge over the Ulvsundet strait on the north side of the island.

== Economy ==
The island has about 1300 residents (in 2017) and it is notable for its aquaculture industry. There is a scallops hatchery located at Rong.

== Education ==
The island is the site of two municipal schools: Rong School (grades 1-7) and Øygarden School (grades 8-10).

== See also ==
- List of islands of Norway
