= Ågotnes =

Village in Øygarden Municipality, Norway

- Village
- Interactive map of Ågotnes
- Coordinates: 60.40264°N 5.00869°E
- Country: Norway
- Region: Western Norway
- County: Vestland
- District: Midhordland
- Municipality: Øygarden Municipality

Area
  - Total: 3.28 km^{2} (1.27 sq mi)
- Elevation: 41 m (135 ft)

Population (2025)
  - Total: 3,628
  - Density: 1,106/km^{2} (2,860/sq mi)
- Time zone: UTC+01:00 (CET)
  - Summer (DST): UTC+02:00 (CEST)
- Post Code: 5363 Ågotnes

Ågotnes is a village in Øygarden Municipality in Vestland county, Norway. The industrial village is located on northern part of the island of Sotra, about 20 kilometres (12 mi) west of the city of Bergen. The village of Landro (and Landro Church) lies about 3 kilometres (1.9 mi) to the northwest.

Ågotnes serves as a commercial centre for the northern part of Sotra. It is the site of a primary school, sports facilities, fire station, and health clinic. It is also a main supply base for the oil industry.

The 3.28-square-kilometre (810-acre) village has a population (2025) of 3,628 which gives the village a population density of 1,106 inhabitants per square kilometre (2,860/sq mi).
