= Blomøyna =

Island in Vestland, Norway

Blomøyna Blomøy (unofficial)
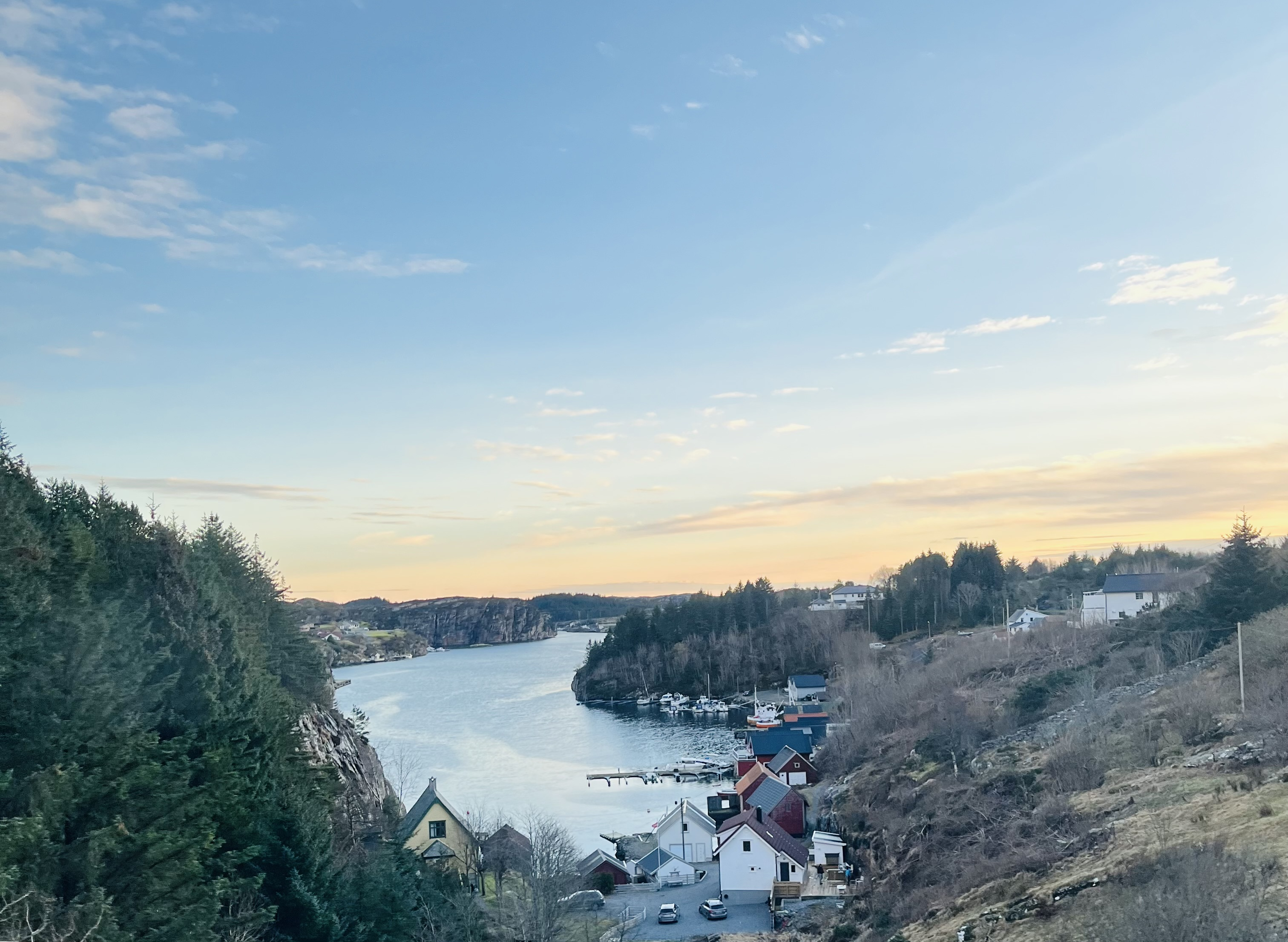
- View of the Blomvågen bay
- Interactive map of the island

Geography
- Location: Vestland, Norway
- Coordinates: 60.5402°N 4.8883°E
- Area: 9.1 km^{2} (3.5 sq mi)
- Length: 5 km (3.1 mi)
- Width: 3.5 km (2.17 mi)
- Highest elevation: 74 m (243 ft)
- Highest point: Blomøyknuten

Administration
- Norway
- County: Vestland
- Municipality: Øygarden Municipality

Demographics
- Population: 638 (2017)

Blomøyna is an island in Øygarden Municipality in Vestland county, Norway. The 9.1-square-kilometre (3.5 sq mi) island lies north of the island of Rongøyna and south of the island of Ona. The southern part of the island is split into two parts by the Blomvågen fjord which cuts northward for 2 kilometres (1.2 mi) into the island. The village of Blomvåg surrounds the inner part of the Blomvågen fjord. Nearly all of the island's 638 residents (in 2017) live in Blomvåg. Blomvåg Church is located in the village.

== See also ==
- List of islands of Norway
