= Sotra =

Island in Vestland, Norway

Sotra Stora Sotra Store Sotra
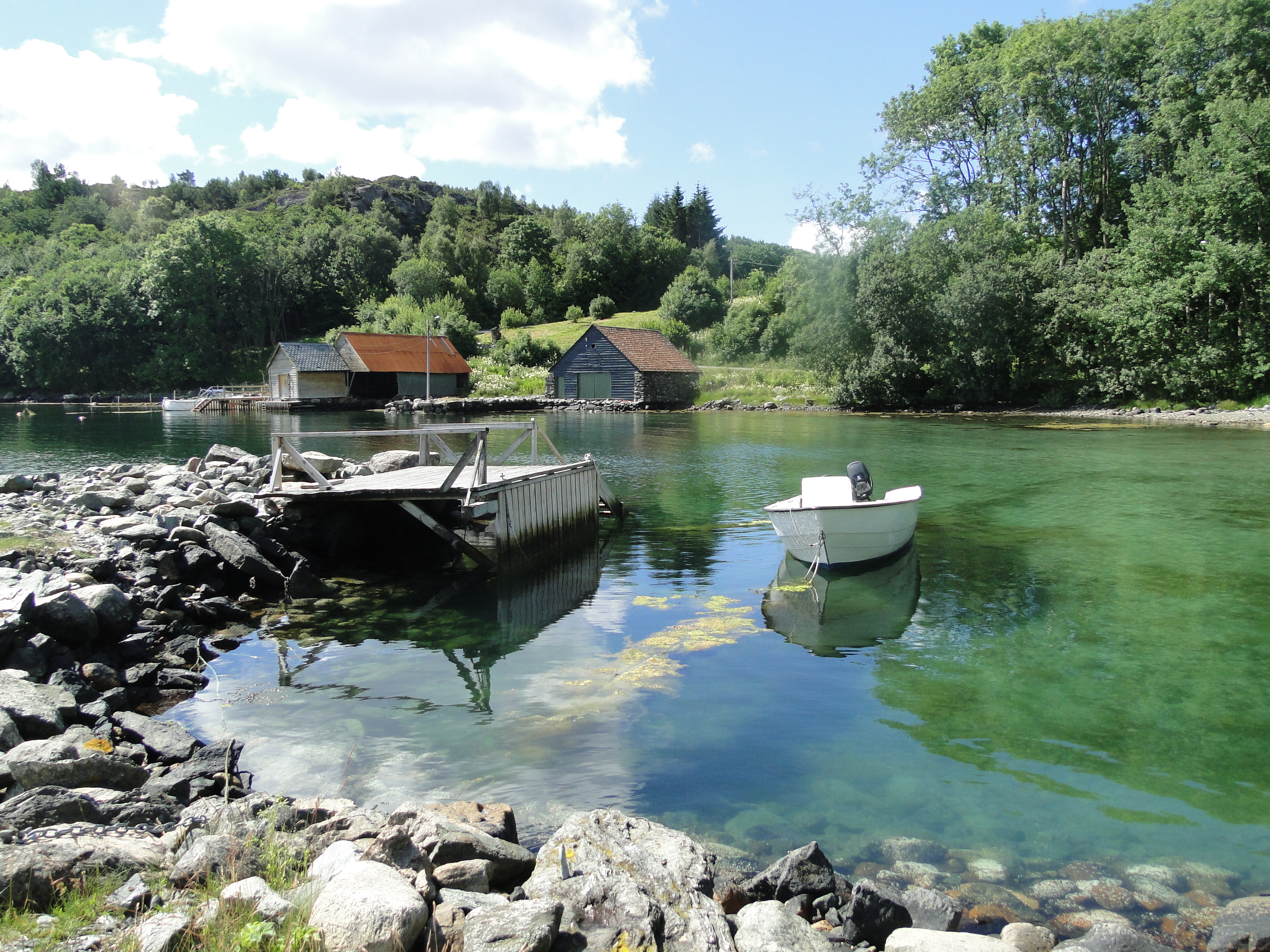
- Interactive map of the island

Geography
- Location: Vestland, Norway
- Coordinates: 60.2366°N 5.0795°E
- Area: 178.6 km^{2} (69.0 sq mi)
- Length: 31 km (19.3 mi)
- Width: 10 km (6 mi)
- Highest elevation: 341 m (1119 ft)
- Highest point: Liatårnet

Administration
- Norway
- County: Vestland
- Municipality: Øygarden Municipality

Demographics
- Population: 19,100 (2017)
- Pop. density: 106.9/km^{2} (276.9/sq mi)

Sotra is the name of the largest island in Øygarden Municipality in Vestland county, Norway. It is located just west of the city of Bergen. It is part of a pair of islands called 'Sotra' and 'Litlesotra' (lit. 'small Sotra') that are part of a large archipelago stretching from Fedje southwards along the coast of Norway. The larger of the two islands is Sotra which is sometimes called Store Sotra (lit. 'Big Sotra'), while Litlesotra is smaller and less populated of the two. Roughly 28,700 (2017) people live on the two islands of Sotra, with the larger island having a population of about 19,100 (2017) and 9,589 (2017) living on the smaller island.

== Geography ==
The main population centres on Sotra include (from north to south) Vindenes, Ågotnes, Knappskog, Møvik, Tælavåg, Hammarsland, Skogsvåg, and Klokkarvik. Historically, part of the island was located in Fjell Municipality, and the large disused Fjell Fortress, built by German forces in World War II, is on the island.

The island of Sotra is part of an archipelago, so it is surrounded by islands and waterways. To the east of Sotra lies the island of Litlesotra. The small islands of Bildøyna and Geitanger lie near Litlesotra. The Raunefjorden (to the east) separates Sotra from the mainland Bergen Peninsula. The small islands of Tyssøyna, Lerøyna, and Bjelkarøyna lie in the Raunefjorden off the southeastern coast of Sotra. To the south of Sotra lies the island of Toftøya and the Krossfjorden. To the west of Sotra lie a number of small islands including Algrøyna and Lokøyna. Finally, to the north of Sotra lie the small islands of Misje, Turøyna, and Toftøyna. Sotra is connected to the mainland by a series of road bridges across Bildøyna and Litlesotra before crossing the Sotra Bridge, the seventh-longest suspension bridge in Norway.

The 341-metre (1,119 ft) tall Liatårnet is the highest mountain on Sotra. Other mountains on the island include the 285-metre (935 ft) tall Førdesveten, the 112-metre (367 ft) tall Gardafjellet, the 164-metre (538 ft) tall Knappskogfjellet, and the 165-metre (541 ft) tall Spjeldsfjellet.

== Media gallery ==
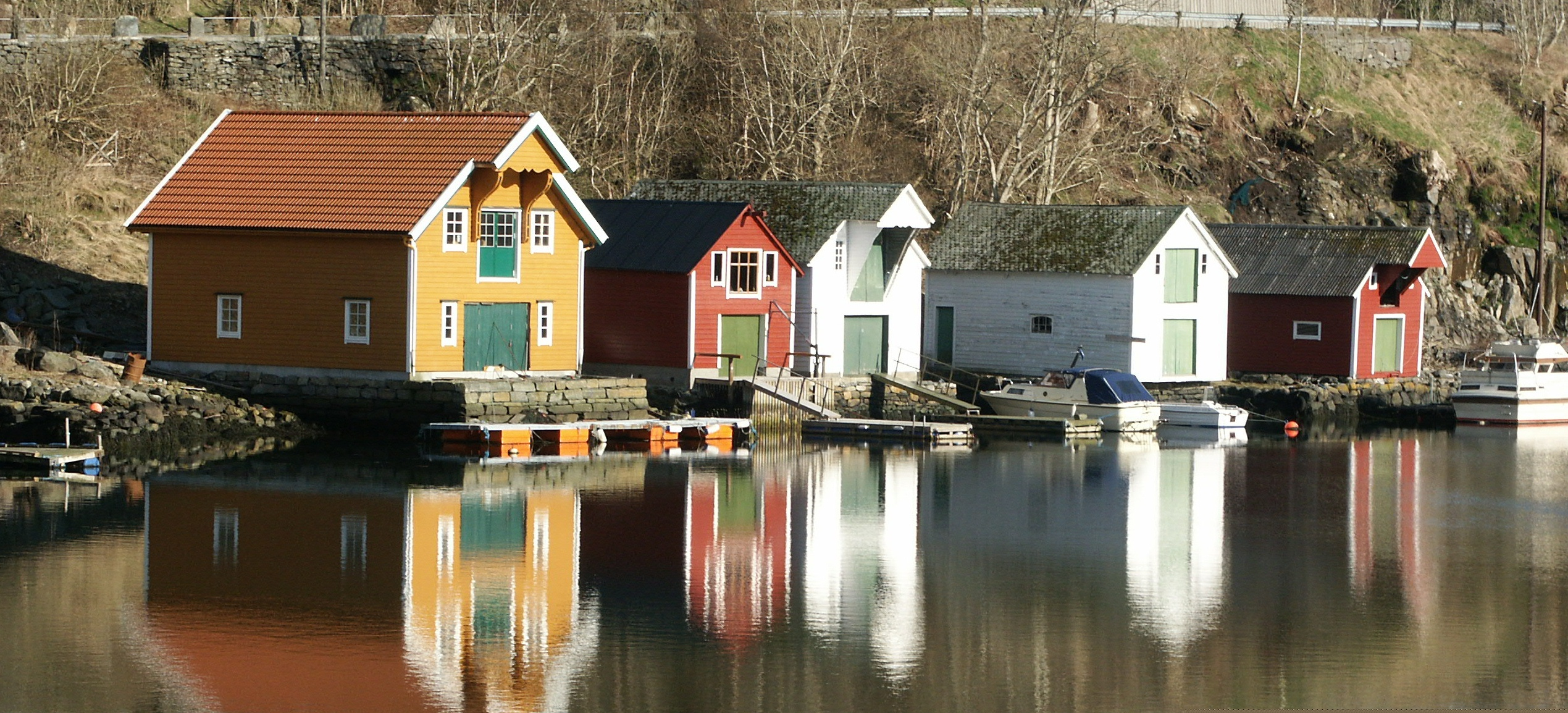
Boathouses at Bildøy.

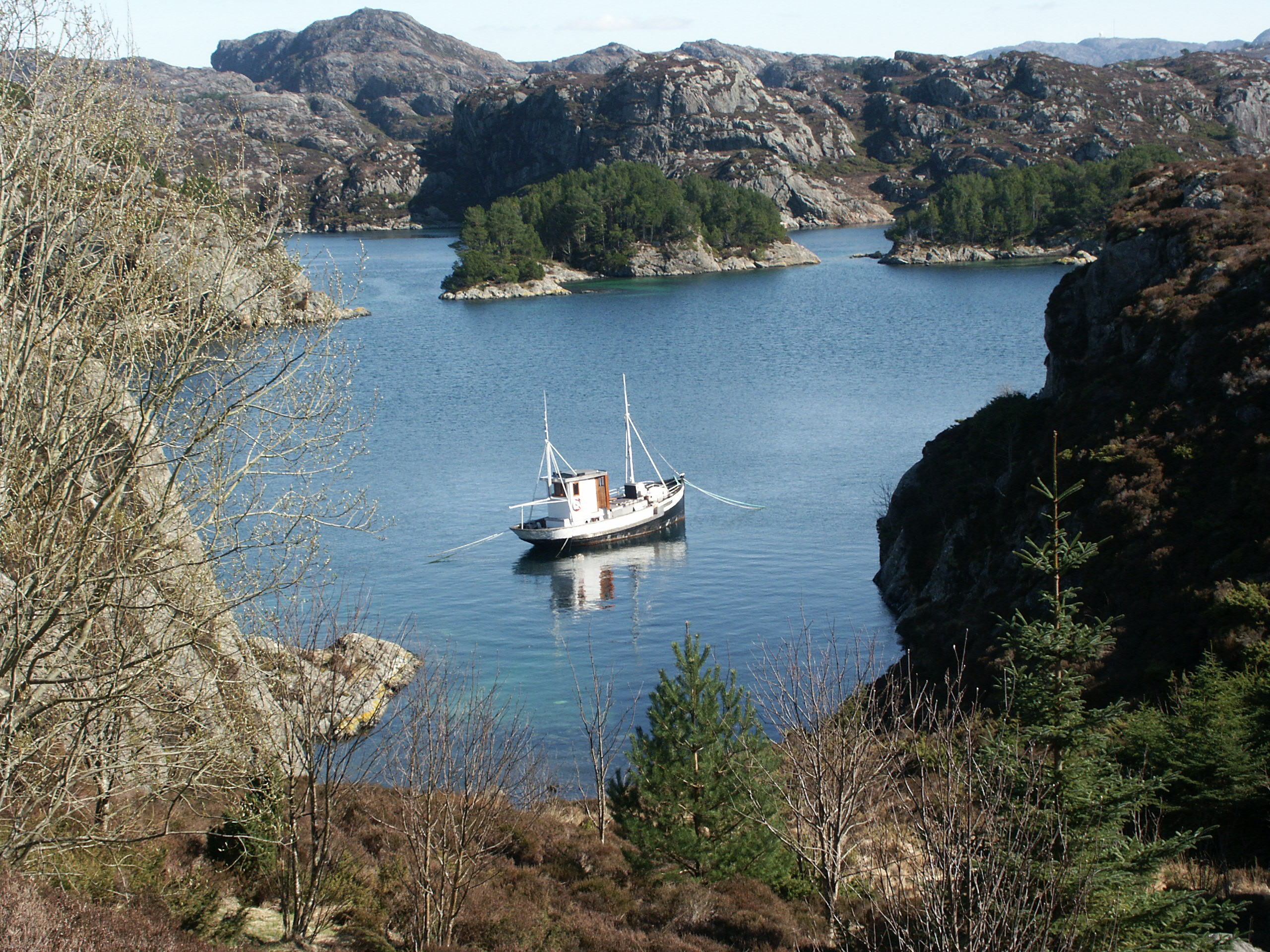
Fishing vessel anchored in a bay.

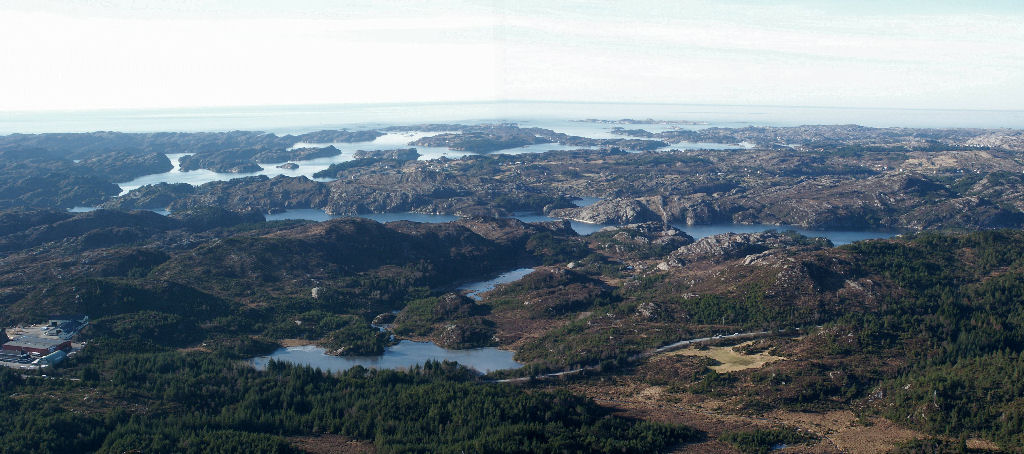
View from Liatårnet.

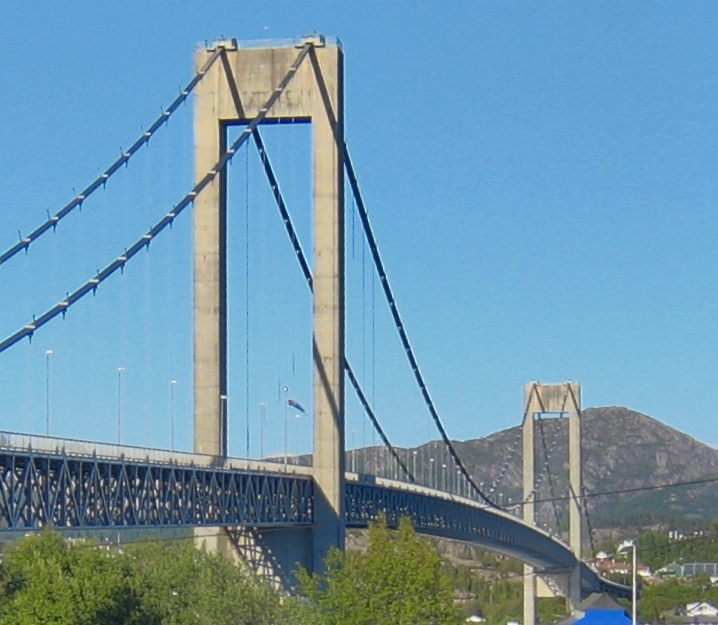
Sotra Bridge.
