= Bildøyna =

Island in Vestland, Norway

Bildøyna Bildøy (unofficial)
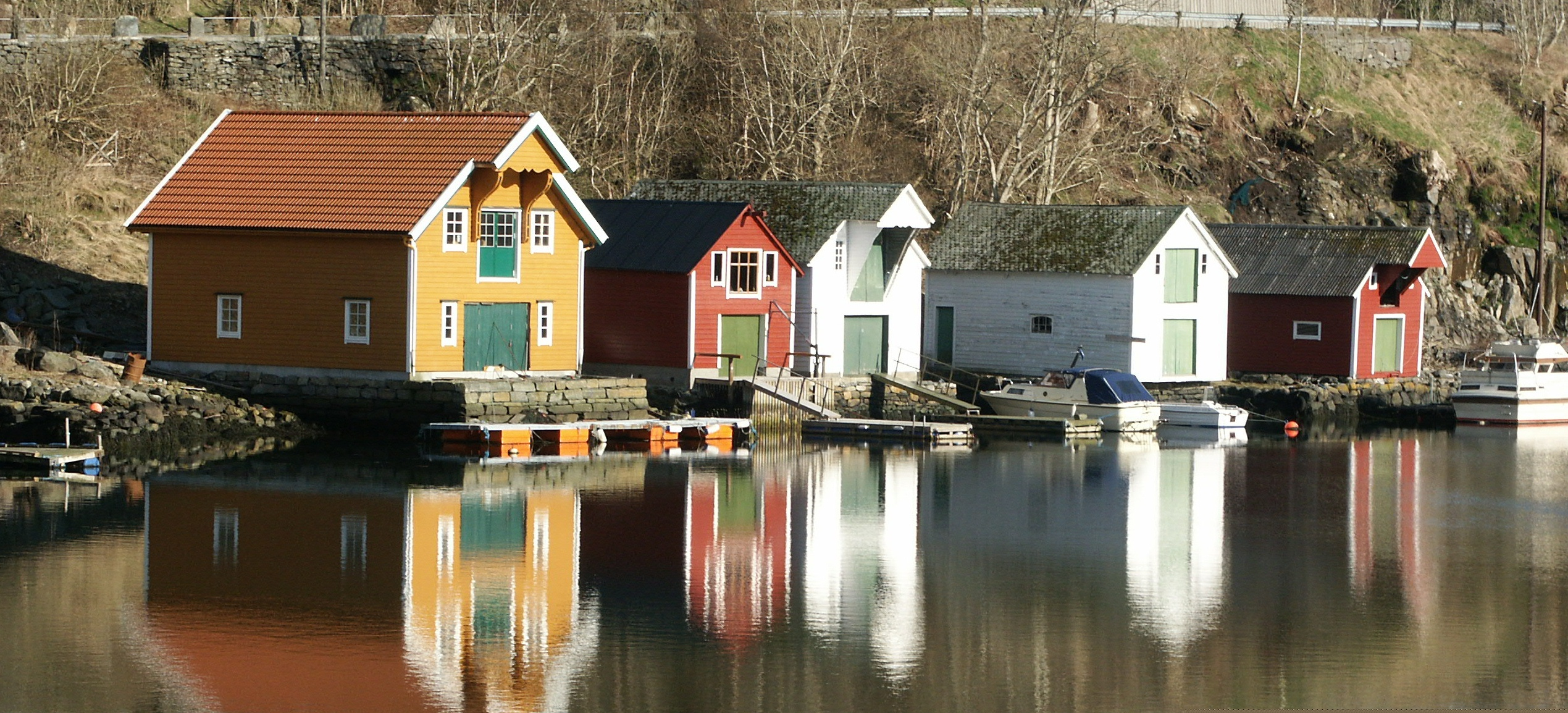
- View of some boathouses on Bildøy
- Interactive map of the island

Geography
- Location: Vestland, Norway
- Coordinates: 60.3539°N 5.1079°E
- Area: 1.5 km^{2} (0.58 sq mi)

Administration
- Norway
- County: Vestland
- Municipality: Øygarden Municipality

Demographics
- Population: 600 (2017)

Bildøyna is a small island in Øygarden Municipality in Vestland county, Norway. The 1.5-square-kilometre (0.58 sq mi) island lies between the islands of Litlesotra to the west and Store Sotra to the east. An upper secondary school and a lower secondary school are located on the island. In 2017, there were about 600 residents on the island. There is a Lutheran Bible school located on the island.

== See also ==
- List of islands of Norway
