= Toftøyna =

Island in Vestland, Norway

Toftøyna Toftøy / Toftøyni
- Interactive map of the island

Geography
- Location: Vestland, Norway
- Coordinates: 60.4821°N 4.9500°E
- Area: 7.5 km^{2} (2.9 sq mi)
- Length: 5 km (3.1 mi)
- Width: 1.9 km (1.18 mi)
- Highest elevation: 60 m (200 ft)
- Highest point: Anekletten

Administration
- Norway
- County: Vestland
- Municipality: Øygarden Municipality

Demographics
- Population: 1,328 (2019)

Toftøyna is an island in Øygarden Municipality in Vestland county, Norway. The 7.5-square-kilometre (2.9 sq mi) island is connected by bridge to the island of Rongøyna (to the north), to the small island of Turøyna (to the southwest), and to the island of Misje (to the south). Toftøyna is connected to the mainland by a series of bridges by heading south via Misje island.

There are 2 main settlements on the rocky island: Vikavågen on the southeastern shore and Torsteinsvik on the northwestern shore. The main road on the island is Norwegian County Road 561 which runs between the two villages, connecting it to the surrounding islands. There are about 1,328 residents living on the island (as of 2019). The Hjeltefjorden flows along the eastern shore of the island and the North Sea lies to the west. There are two small straits to the north and south of the island, separating it from the neighboring islands of Rongøyna and Misje.

== See also ==
- List of islands of Norway
