= Geitanger =

Island in Vestland, Norway

Geitanger Geitung
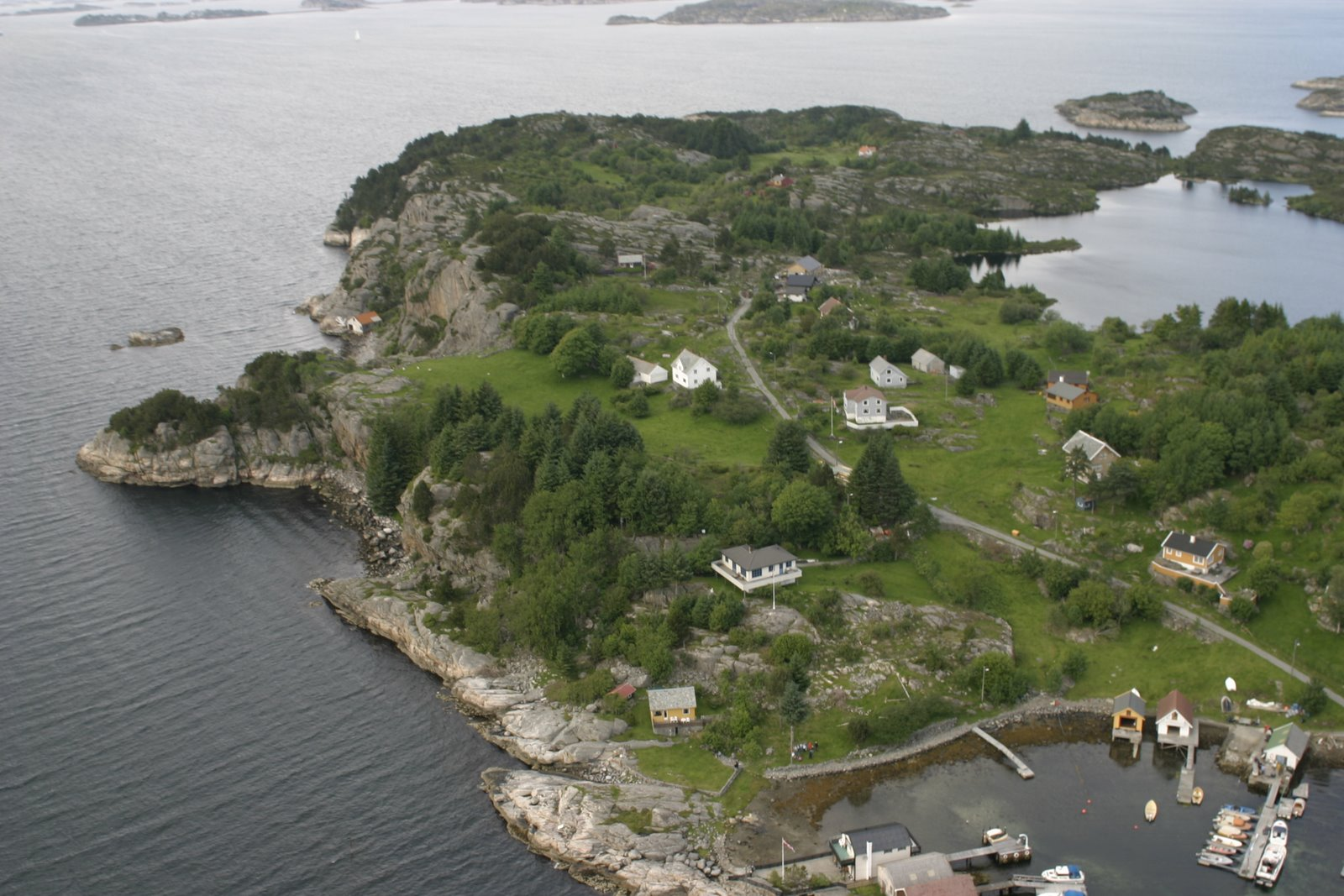
- Northern Geitanger
- Interactive map of the island

Geography
- Location: Vestland, Norway
- Coordinates: 60.39486°N 5.0731°E
- Area: 0.9 km^{2} (0.35 sq mi)
- Length: 1.6 km (0.99 mi)
- Width: 850 m (2790 ft)
- Highest elevation: 63 m (207 ft)
- Highest point: Søre Nuten

Administration
- Norway
- County: Vestland
- Municipality: Øygarden Municipality

Geitanger is an island in Øygarden Municipality in Vestland county, Norway. The 0.9-square-kilometre (220-acre) island is entirely car-free, and the population of the island is very low.

== See also ==
- List of islands of Norway
