= Hjeltefjorden =

Fjord near Bergen, Norway

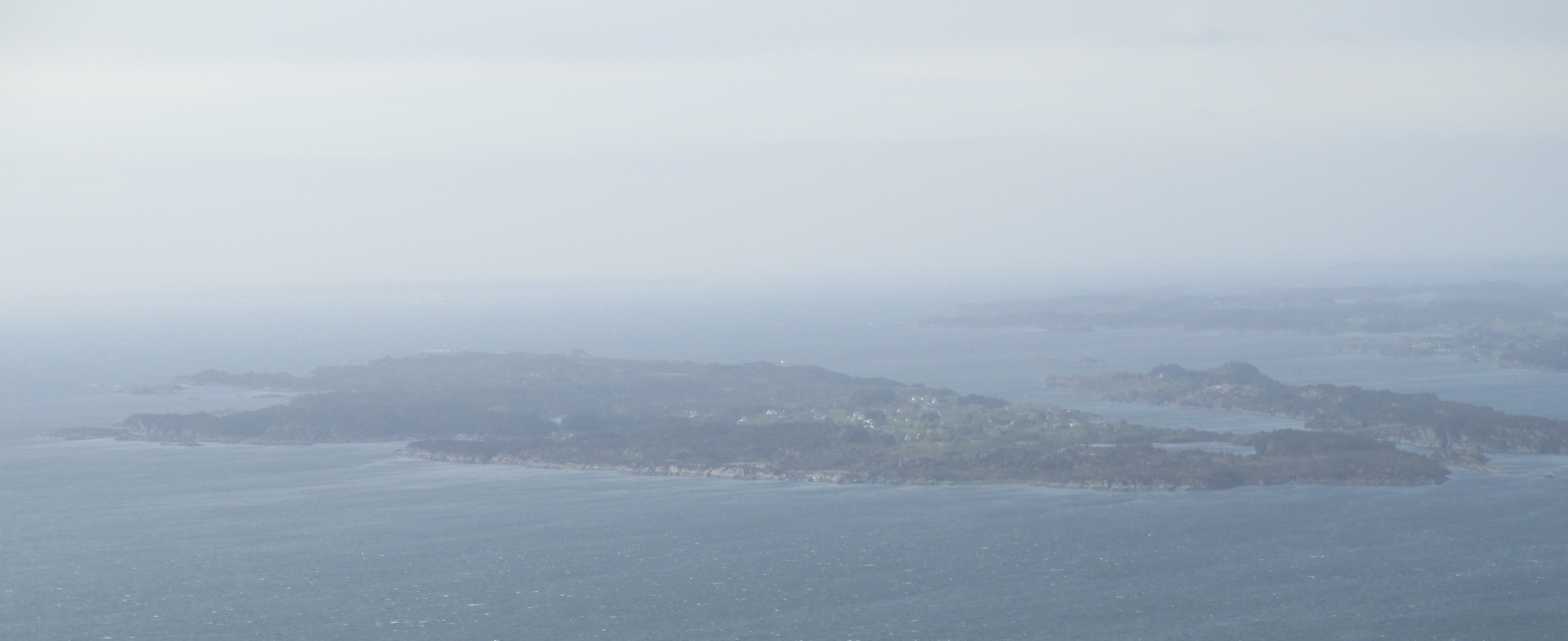
- View of the fjord
- Interactive map of Hjeltefjorden
- Location: Vestland county, Norway
- Coordinates: 60.53°N 4.94842°E
- Type: Fjord
- Primary inflows: Byfjorden
- Primary outflows: Fedjefjorden
- Basin countries: Norway
- Max. length: 35 kilometres (22 mi)
- Max. width: 4.5 kilometres (2.8 mi)

Hjeltefjorden is a fjord in Vestland county, Norway. The 35-kilometre (22 mi) long fjord runs north–south between many islands leading from the open ocean to the city of Bergen. It passes through the municipalities of Fedje, Øygarden, Alver, and Askøy. Its name is derived from Hjaltland, the Old Norse name for Shetland. The main shipping routes from Bergen to Shetland ran through Hjeltefjorden.

Hjeltefjorden is a major shipping route into the city of Bergen, and it runs from the island of Fedje in the north to Byfjorden in the south. It is delimited to the west by the islands of Øygarden and Sotra and to the east by the islands of Radøy, Holsnøy, Herdla and Askøy.

Hjeltefjorden was the site of the closing stages of the Battle of Alvøen in 1808.

== See also ==
- List of Norwegian fjords
