= Radøy Municipality =

Former municipality in Hordaland, Norway

Radøy Municipality Radøy kommune
- Former municipality
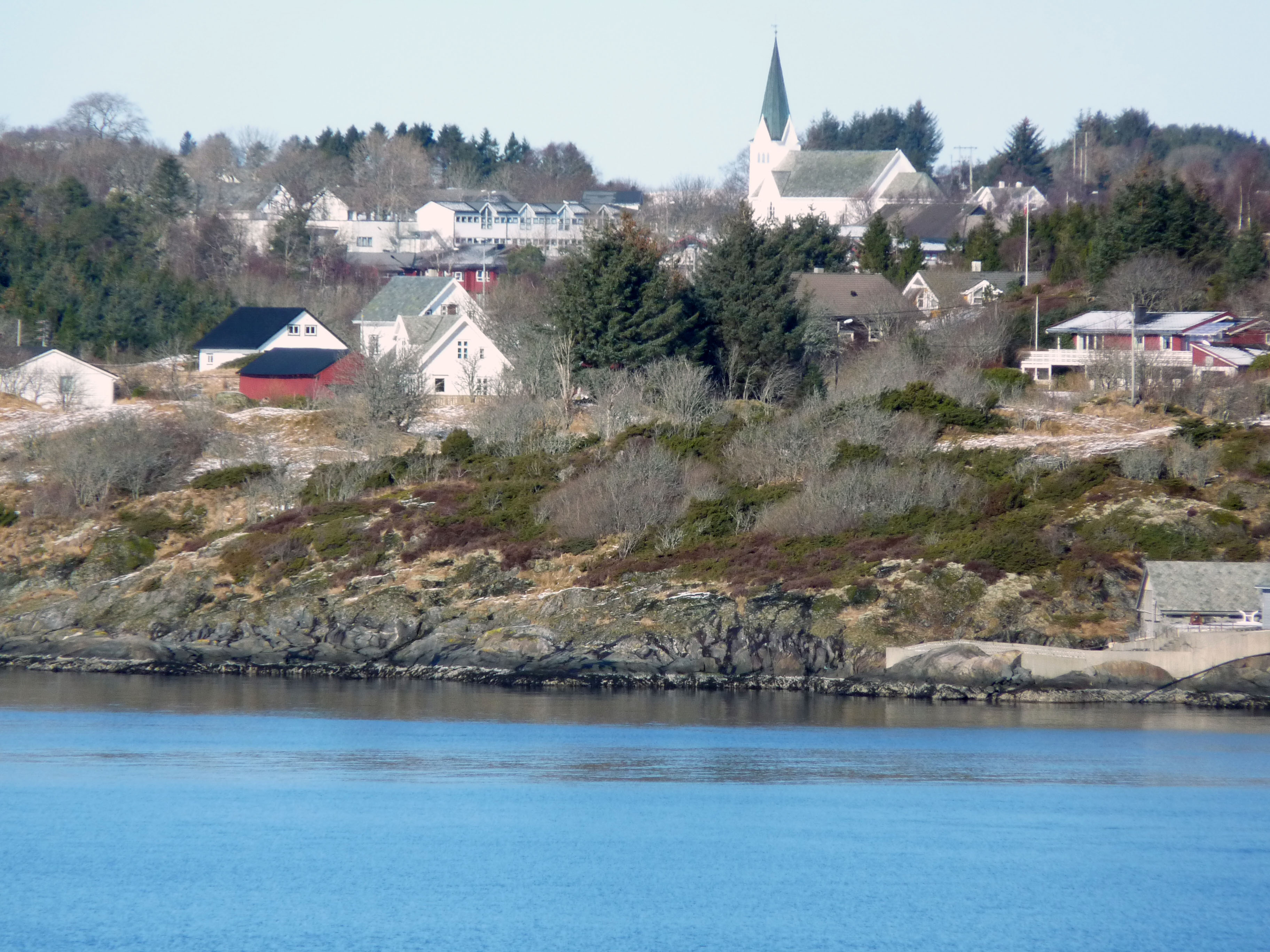
- View of the village of Manger

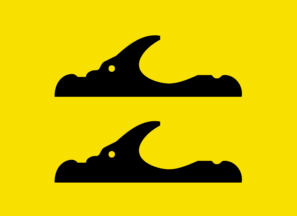
- Flag Coat of arms

- Hordaland within Norway

- Radøy within Hordaland
- Coordinates: 60°40′09″N 05°02′10″E
- Country: Norway
- County: Hordaland
- District: Nordhordland
- Established: 1 Jan 1964
  - Preceded by: Hordabø Municipality, Sæbø Municipality, and Manger Municipality
- Disestablished: 1 Jan 2020
  - Succeeded by: Alver Municipality
- Administrative centre: Manger

Government
  - Mayor (2007-2019): Jon Askeland (Sp)

Area (upon dissolution)
  - Total: 111.44 km^{2} (43.03 sq mi)
  - Land: 106.80 km^{2} (41.24 sq mi)
  - Water: 4.64 km^{2} (1.79 sq mi) 4.2%
  - Rank: #372 in Norway
- Highest elevation: 216.7 m (711 ft)

Population (2019)
  - Total: 5,091
  - Rank: #199 in Norway
  - Density: 45.7/km^{2} (118/sq mi)
  - Change (10 years): ▲ +5.5%
- Demonym: Radværing

Official language
  - Norwegian form: Nynorsk
- Time zone: UTC+01:00 (CET)
  - Summer (DST): UTC+02:00 (CEST)
- ISO 3166 code: NO-1260

Radøy is a former municipality in the old Hordaland county, Norway. The 111.44-square-kilometre (43.03 sq mi) municipality existed from 1964 until its dissolution in 2020. The area is now part of Alver Municipality in the traditional district of Nordhordland in Vestland county. The administrative centre was the village of Manger. Other villages in the municipality included Askeland, Austmarka, Bøvågen, Haugland, Sæbø, and Sletta. The municipality included almost all of the island of Radøy plus many small surrounding islands.

Prior to its dissolution in 2020, the 111.44-square-kilometre (43.03 sq mi) municipality was the 372nd largest by area out of the 422 municipalities in Norway. Radøy Municipality was the 199th most populous municipality in Norway with a population of about 5,091. The municipality's population density was 45.7 inhabitants per square kilometre (118/sq mi) and its population had increased by 5.5% over the previous 10-year period.

== General information ==
During the 1960s, there were many municipal mergers across Norway due to the work of the Schei Committee. On 1 January 1964, Radøy Municipality was created by merging the following areas:

- all of Manger Municipality (population: 1,344)
- all of Hordabø Municipality (population: 1,679)
- the island of Bogno from Herdla Municipality (population: 29)
- most of Sæbø Municipality, except the Titland area on the Lindås peninsula (population: 916)
- the Sletta area on the island of Radøy from Lindås Municipality (population: 305)
- the Straume area on the island of Radøy and the small island of Fesøyna from Austrheim Municipality (population: 56)

Historically, this municipality was part of the old Hordaland county. On 1 January 2020, the municipality became a part of the newly-formed Vestland county (after Hordaland and Sogn og Fjordane counties were merged). Also on that same date, Meland Municipality, Radøy Municipality, and Lindås Municipality were merged to form the new Alver Municipality.

=== Name ===
The municipality is named after the island of Radøy (Old Norse: Rǫð) since the municipality encompassed the island. The first element is rǫð which means "row", "ridge", or "line" (here in the sense that it is a "long island" sticking out of the ocean). The last element, øy which means "island", was added later as a suffix to the name.

=== Coat of arms ===
The coat of arms was granted on 14 June 1991 and it was in use until 1 January 2020 when the municipality was dissolved. The official blazon is "Or, two oarlocks in pale sable" (Norwegian: På gul grunn to svarte årekeipar.). This means the arms have a field (background) has a tincture of Or which means it is commonly colored yellow, but if it is made out of metal, then gold is used. The charge is a pair of oarlocks, one above the other. Oarlocks are on the gunwale of a boat and they support the oar and give force to the rower's stroke. Some of these objects have been found in several places in Radøy and the artifacts date back to the first century BC. The arms were designed by Even Jarl Skoglund. The municipal flag has the same design as the coat of arms.

=== Churches ===
The Church of Norway had one parish (sokn) within Radøy Municipality. It is part of the Nordhordland prosti (deanery) in the Diocese of Bjørgvin.

Churches in Radøy Municipality
| Parish (sokn) | Church name | Location of the church | Year built |
|---|---|---|---|
| Radøy | Hordabø Church | Bøvågen | 1875 |
| Radøy | Manger Church | Manger | 1891 |
| Radøy | Sæbø Church | Sæbø | 1883 |
| Radøy | Emigrant Church, Sletta | Sletta | 1997 |

== Population ==
Historical population
| Year | 1964 | 1970 | 1980 | 1990 | 2000 | 2010 | 2019 |
| Pop. | 4,329 | 4,100 | 4,363 | 4,560 | 4,585 | 4,825 | 5,128 |
| ±% p.a. | — | −0.90% | +0.62% | +0.44% | +0.05% | +0.51% | +0.68% |
Source: Statistics Norway

== Geography ==
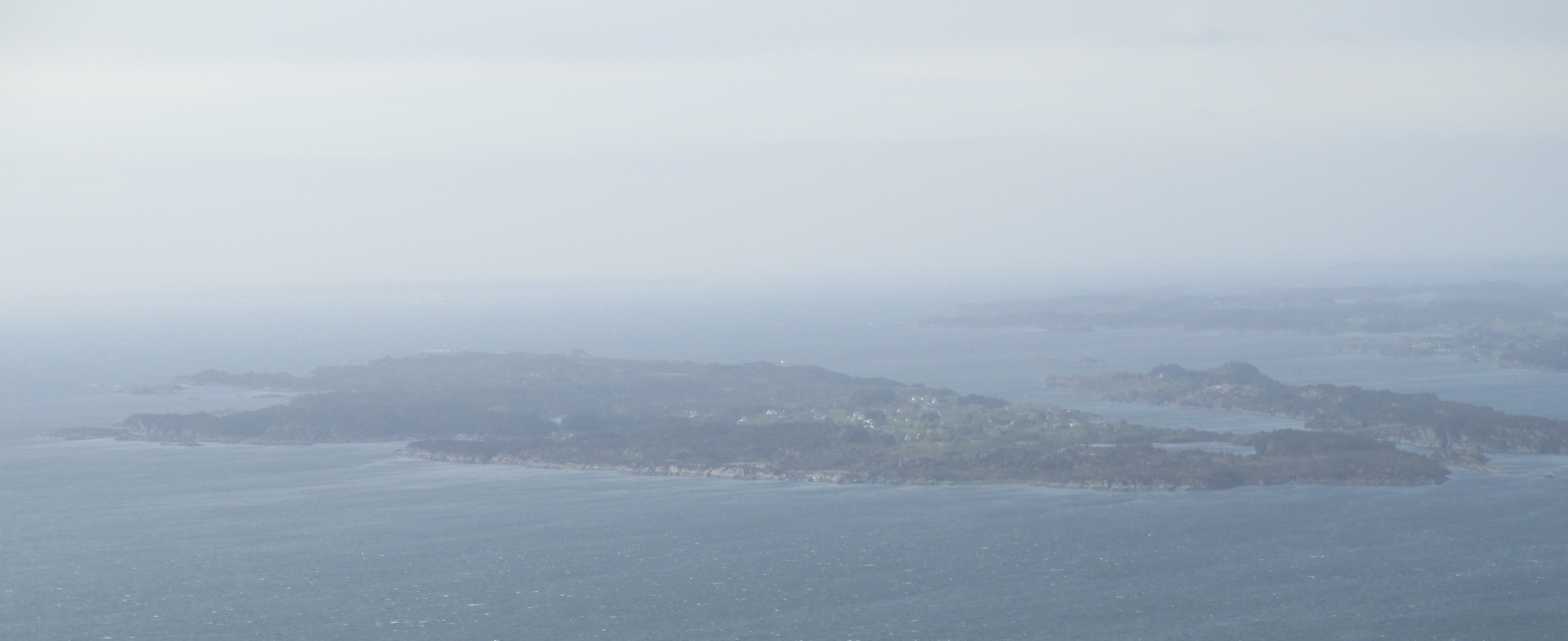
View of the island of Toska

The municipality encompassed all of the island of Radøy, except the far southern tip (which belonged to Lindås Municipality). The smaller surrounding islands of Toska, Bogno, Fesøy, and others were also part of Radøy Municipality. The highest point in the municipality was the 216.7-metre (711 ft) tall mountain Morkefjellet.

The Radfjorden separated Radøy Municipality from Meland Municipality to the south. The Radsundet strait separated the municipality from Lindås Municipality to the east. The island of Fosnøyna (in Austrheim Municipality) was located to the north. The islands of Øygarden Municipality sat across the Hjeltefjorden to the west.

== Government ==
While it existed, Radøy Municipality was responsible for primary education (through 10th grade), outpatient health services, senior citizen services, welfare and other social services, zoning, economic development, and municipal roads and utilities. The municipality was governed by a municipal council of directly elected representatives. The mayor was indirectly elected by a vote of the municipal council. The municipality was under the jurisdiction of the Nordhordland District Court and Gulating Court of Appeal.

=== Municipal council ===
The municipal council (Kommunestyre) of Radøy Municipality was made up of 25 representatives that were elected to four year terms. The tables below show the historical composition of the council by political party.

Radøy kommunestyre 2015–2019
| Party name (in Nynorsk) | Number of representatives |
|---|---|
| Labour Party (Arbeidarpartiet) | 5 |
| Progress Party (Framstegspartiet) | 2 |
| Conservative Party (Høgre) | 5 |
| Christian Democratic Party (Kristeleg Folkeparti) | 2 |
| Centre Party (Senterpartiet) | 9 |
| Liberal Party (Venstre) | 2 |
| Total number of members: | 25 |
Note: On 1 January 2020, Radøy Municipality became part of Alver Municipality.

Radøy kommunestyre 2011–2015
| Party name (in Nynorsk) | Number of representatives |
|---|---|
| Labour Party (Arbeidarpartiet) | 4 |
| Progress Party (Framstegspartiet) | 3 |
| Conservative Party (Høgre) | 5 |
| Christian Democratic Party (Kristeleg Folkeparti) | 2 |
| Centre Party (Senterpartiet) | 9 |
| Liberal Party (Venstre) | 2 |
| Total number of members: | 25 |

Radøy kommunestyre 2007–2011
| Party name (in Nynorsk) | Number of representatives |
|---|---|
| Labour Party (Arbeidarpartiet) | 4 |
| Progress Party (Framstegspartiet) | 4 |
| Conservative Party (Høgre) | 4 |
| Christian Democratic Party (Kristeleg Folkeparti) | 2 |
| Centre Party (Senterpartiet) | 8 |
| Liberal Party (Venstre) | 2 |
| Joint list of the Red Party (Raudt) and the Socialist Left Party (Sosialistisk Venstreparti) | 1 |
| Total number of members: | 25 |

Radøy kommunestyre 2003–2007
| Party name (in Nynorsk) | Number of representatives |
|---|---|
| Labour Party (Arbeidarpartiet) | 5 |
| Progress Party (Framstegspartiet) | 5 |
| Conservative Party (Høgre) | 3 |
| Christian Democratic Party (Kristeleg Folkeparti) | 2 |
| Centre Party (Senterpartiet) | 7 |
| Liberal Party (Venstre) | 3 |
| Total number of members: | 25 |

Radøy kommunestyre 1999–2003
| Party name (in Nynorsk) | Number of representatives |
|---|---|
| Labour Party (Arbeidarpartiet) | 6 |
| Progress Party (Framstegspartiet) | 3 |
| Conservative Party (Høgre) | 4 |
| Christian Democratic Party (Kristeleg Folkeparti) | 4 |
| Centre Party (Senterpartiet) | 8 |
| Liberal Party (Venstre) | 3 |
| Common List (Samlingslista) | 1 |
| Total number of members: | 29 |

Radøy kommunestyre 1995–1999
| Party name (in Nynorsk) | Number of representatives |
|---|---|
| Labour Party (Arbeidarpartiet) | 8 |
| Conservative Party (Høgre) | 5 |
| Christian Democratic Party (Kristeleg Folkeparti) | 4 |
| Centre Party (Senterpartiet) | 10 |
| Liberal Party (Venstre) | 1 |
| Common list (Samlingslista) | 1 |
| Total number of members: | 29 |

Radøy kommunestyre 1991–1995
| Party name (in Nynorsk) | Number of representatives |
|---|---|
| Labour Party (Arbeidarpartiet) | 9 |
| Conservative Party (Høgre) | 4 |
| Christian Democratic Party (Kristeleg Folkeparti) | 4 |
| Centre Party (Senterpartiet) | 9 |
| Liberal Party (Venstre) | 1 |
| Common list (Samlingslista) | 2 |
| Total number of members: | 29 |

Radøy kommunestyre 1987–1991
| Party name (in Nynorsk) | Number of representatives |
|---|---|
| Labour Party (Arbeidarpartiet) | 11 |
| Conservative Party (Høgre) | 4 |
| Christian Democratic Party (Kristeleg Folkeparti) | 5 |
| Centre Party (Senterpartiet) | 5 |
| Joint list of the Liberal Party (Venstre) and Liberal People's Party (Liberale Folkepartiet) | 2 |
| Common list (Samlingslista) | 2 |
| Total number of members: | 29 |

Radøy kommunestyre 1983–1987
| Party name (in Nynorsk) | Number of representatives |
|---|---|
| Labour Party (Arbeidarpartiet) | 11 |
| Conservative Party (Høgre) | 5 |
| Christian Democratic Party (Kristeleg Folkeparti) | 6 |
| Liberal People's Party (Liberale Folkepartiet) | 2 |
| Centre Party (Senterpartiet) | 4 |
| Liberal Party (Venstre) | 1 |
| Total number of members: | 29 |

Radøy kommunestyre 1979–1983
| Party name (in Nynorsk) | Number of representatives |
|---|---|
| Labour Party (Arbeidarpartiet) | 9 |
| Conservative Party (Høgre) | 5 |
| Christian Democratic Party (Kristeleg Folkeparti) | 6 |
| New People's Party (Nye Folkepartiet) | 2 |
| Centre Party (Senterpartiet) | 5 |
| Liberal Party (Venstre) | 2 |
| Total number of members: | 29 |

Radøy kommunestyre 1975–1979
| Party name (in Nynorsk) | Number of representatives |
|---|---|
| Labour Party (Arbeidarpartiet) | 10 |
| Conservative Party (Høgre) | 3 |
| Christian Democratic Party (Kristeleg Folkeparti) | 7 |
| New People's Party (Nye Folkepartiet) | 2 |
| Centre Party (Senterpartiet) | 6 |
| Liberal Party (Venstre) | 1 |
| Total number of members: | 29 |

Radøy kommunestyre 1971–1975
| Party name (in Nynorsk) | Number of representatives |
|---|---|
| Labour Party (Arbeidarpartiet) | 10 |
| Conservative Party (Høgre) | 2 |
| Christian Democratic Party (Kristeleg Folkeparti) | 6 |
| Centre Party (Senterpartiet) | 8 |
| Liberal Party (Venstre) | 3 |
| Total number of members: | 29 |

Radøy kommunestyre 1967–1971
| Party name (in Nynorsk) | Number of representatives |
|---|---|
| Labour Party (Arbeidarpartiet) | 10 |
| Conservative Party (Høgre) | 1 |
| Christian Democratic Party (Kristeleg Folkeparti) | 5 |
| Centre Party (Senterpartiet) | 7 |
| Liberal Party (Venstre) | 4 |
| Local List(s) (Lokale lister) | 2 |
| Total number of members: | 29 |

Radøy kommunestyre 1964–1967
| Party name (in Nynorsk) | Number of representatives |
|---|---|
| Labour Party (Arbeidarpartiet) | 10 |
| Conservative Party (Høgre) | 1 |
| Christian Democratic Party (Kristeleg Folkeparti) | 5 |
| Centre Party (Senterpartiet) | 6 |
| Liberal Party (Venstre) | 3 |
| Local List(s) (Lokale lister) | 4 |
| Total number of members: | 29 |

=== Mayors ===
The mayor (Nynorsk: ordførar) of Radøy Municipality was the political leader of the municipality and the chairperson of the municipal council. The following people held this position:

- 1964–1969: Vilhelm Kartveit (Sp)
- 1969–1971: Nils Gjerde (KrF)
- 1971–1979: Normann Villanger (Sp)
- 1979–1983: Meinert Helland (KrF)
- 1983–1991: Olav Marås (Ap)
- 1991–2007: Olav Steinar Namtvedt (Sp)
- 2007–2019: Jon Askeland (Sp)

== See also ==
- List of former municipalities of Norway
