= Manger (disambiguation) =

A manger is a trough or box of carved stone or wood construction used to hold food for animals.

Manger may also refer to:

== People ==
- Albert Manger (1899-1985), American weightlifter
- Carola von der Weth (born Manger, 1959), German chess master
- Itzik Manger (1901-1969), Yiddish writer
- James Manger (born 1958), former English cricketer
- Josef Manger (1913-1991), German weightlifter
- Jürgen von Manger (1923-1994), German actor and comedian
- Rosi Manger, Swiss curler
- William Manger (disambiguation), a list of several people named William Manger

== Places ==
- Manger, Norway, a village in Alver municipality in Vestland county, Norway
- Manger Municipality, a former municipality in the old Hordaland county, Norway
- Manger Church, a church in Alver municipality in Vestland county, Norway
- Manger Square, a square in Bethlehem, Palestinian territories
- Mount Manger, a mountain in Antarctica
- The Manger, a dry valley below Whitehorse Hill in Oxfordshire, England

== Businesses ==
- Manger Hotels, a former hotel chain

== Other ==
- Away in a Manger, a Christmas carol
- Nativity scene, representing the birth of Jesus Christ
