= Askeland, Radøy =

Village in Alver Municipality, Norway

Askeland
- Village
- Interactive map of Askeland
- Coordinates: 60.64396°N 5.12682°E
- Country: Norway
- Region: Western Norway
- County: Vestland
- District: Nordhordland
- Municipality: Alver Municipality
- Elevation: 42 m (138 ft)
- Time zone: UTC+01:00 (CET)
  - Summer (DST): UTC+02:00 (CEST)
- Post Code: 5938 Sæbøvågen

Askeland is a village in Alver Municipality in Vestland county, Norway. The village is located on the southern part of the island of Radøy, about 3 kilometres (1.9 mi) north of the village of Sæbø and about 6 kilometres (3.7 mi) southeast of the village of Manger.

The village was part of Radøy Municipality before 2020 when it became part of the newly created Alver Municipality.
