= Olav Marås =

Norwegian politician (1931–2025)

Olav Marås (11 April 1931, Sæbø – 28 September 2025) was a Norwegian politician for the Labour Party.

He was elected to the Parliament of Norway from Hordaland in 1969, but was not re-elected in 1973. He served as a deputy representative during the terms 1965–1969 and 1973–1977. From 1973 to 1974, during the second cabinet Bratteli, Marås was appointed State Secretary in the Ministry of Transport.

On the local level he was a member of the municipal council of Sæbø Municipality from 1955 to 1963, serving the last four years as deputy mayor. He then became a member of the executive committee of its successor, Radøy Municipality, from 1963 to 1972, and mayor there from 1983 to 1990. From 1969 to 1971 he was also a member of the Hordaland County Council.
