= Hordabø Municipality =

Former municipality in Hordaland, Norway

Hordabø Municipality Hordabø herad
- Former municipality
- Bø herad (historic name)
- Hordaland within Norway

- Hordabø within Hordaland
- Coordinates: 60°41′51″N 04°55′40″E
- Country: Norway
- County: Hordaland
- District: Nordhordland
- Established: 1 July 1924
  - Preceded by: Manger Municipality
- Disestablished: 1 Jan 1964
  - Succeeded by: Radøy Municipality
- Administrative centre: Bøvågen

Area (upon dissolution)
  - Total: 39.5 km^{2} (15.3 sq mi)
  - Rank: #599 in Norway
- Highest elevation: 154 m (505 ft)

Population (1963)
  - Total: 1,704
  - Rank: #493 in Norway
  - Density: 43.1/km^{2} (112/sq mi)
  - Change (10 years): ▼ −8.8%

Official language
  - Norwegian form: Nynorsk
- Time zone: UTC+01:00 (CET)
  - Summer (DST): UTC+02:00 (CEST)
- ISO 3166 code: NO-1260

Hordabø is a former municipality in the old Hordaland county, Norway. The 39.5-square-kilometre (15.3 sq mi) municipality existed from 1924 until its dissolution in 1964. The area is now part of Alver Municipality in the traditional district of Nordhordland in Vestland county. The administrative centre was the village of Bøvågen, where Hordabø Church is located.

Prior to its dissolution in 1964, the 39.5-square-kilometre (15.3 sq mi) municipality was the 599th largest by area out of the 689 municipalities in Norway. Hordabø Municipality was the 493rd most populous municipality in Norway with a population of about 1,704. The municipality's population density was 43.1 inhabitants per square kilometre (112/sq mi) and its population had decreased by 8.8% over the previous 10-year period.

== General information ==
The parish of Bø (later changed to Hordabø) was established as a municipality on 1 July 1924 when the old Manger Municipality was divided into three municipalities: Bø Municipality (population: 1,938) in the north, a much smaller Manger Municipality (population: 1,426) in the central part, and Sæbø Municipality (population: 1,125) in the south.

On 13 March 1925 the name was changed by royal resolution from Bø to Hordabø.

During the 1960s, there were many municipal mergers across Norway due to the work of the Schei Committee. On 1 January 1964, the municipality was dissolved and a merged with the following places to form the new Radøy Municipality.

- all of Hordabø Municipality (population: 1,679)
- all of Manger Municipality (population: 1,344)
- the island of Bogno from Herdla Municipality (population: 29)
- most of Sæbø Municipality, except the Titland area on the Lindås peninsula (population: 916)
- the Sletta area on the island of Radøy from Lindås Municipality (population: 305)
- the Straume area on the island of Radøy and the small island of Fesøy from Austrheim Municipality (population: 56)

=== Name ===
The municipality (originally the parish) is named after the old Bø farm (Old Norse: Bœr) since the first Bø Church was built there. The name comes from the word bœr which means "farm" or "farmhouse". Historically, the name of the municipality was Bø. On 13 March 1925, a royal resolution changed the name of the municipality to Hordabø. The prefix Horda- was added to distinguish this "Bø" from several other Norwegian municipalities with the same name. The prefix comes from the word hǫrðar which is the Old Norse name for the people from Hordaland.

=== Churches ===
The Church of Norway had one parish (sokn) within Hordabø Municipality. At the time of the municipal dissolution, it was part of the Manger prestegjeld and the Nordhordland prosti (deanery) in the Diocese of Bjørgvin.

Churches in Hordabø Municipality
Parish (sokn)	Church name	Location of the church	Year built
Hordabø	Hordabø Church	Bøvågen	1875

== Geography ==
Hordabø Municipality was located on the northern part of the island of Radøy, plus a number of small surrounding islets and skerries. The highest point in the municipality was the 154-metre (505 ft) tall mountain Kalsås, on the border with Manger Municipality.

Austrheim Municipality was located to the north, Lindås Municipality was located to the east, Manger Municipality was located to the south, Hjelme Municipality was located to the west, and Fedje Municipality was located to the northwest.

== Government ==
While it existed, Hordabø Municipality was responsible for primary education (through 10th grade), outpatient health services, senior citizen services, welfare and other social services, zoning, economic development, and municipal roads and utilities. The municipality was governed by a municipal council of directly elected representatives. The mayor was indirectly elected by a vote of the municipal council. The municipality was under the jurisdiction of the Gulating Court of Appeal.

=== Municipal council ===
The municipal council (Heradsstyre) of Hordabø Municipality was made up of 19 representatives that were elected to four year terms. The tables below show the historical composition of the council by political party.

Hordabø heradsstyre 1959–1963
Party name (in Nynorsk)	Number of representatives
Labour Party (Arbeidarpartiet)	4
Liberal Party (Venstre)	1
Local List(s) (Lokale lister)	14
Total number of members:	19
Note: On 1 January 1964, Hordabø Municipality became part of Radøy Municipality.

Hordabø heradsstyre 1955–1959
Party name (in Nynorsk)	Number of representatives
Labour Party (Arbeidarpartiet)	4
Liberal Party (Venstre)	1
Joint List(s) of Non-Socialist Parties (Borgarlege Felleslister)	2
Local List(s) (Lokale lister)	12
Total number of members:	19

Hordabø heradsstyre 1951–1955
Party name (in Nynorsk)	Number of representatives
Labour Party (Arbeidarpartiet)	4
Liberal Party (Venstre)	2
Local List(s) (Lokale lister)	10
Total number of members:	16

Hordabø heradsstyre 1947–1951
Party name (in Nynorsk)	Number of representatives
Labour Party (Arbeidarpartiet)	4
Christian Democratic Party (Kristeleg Folkeparti)	1
Liberal Party (Venstre)	1
Local List(s) (Lokale lister)	10
Total number of members:	16

Hordabø heradsstyre 1945–1947
Party name (in Nynorsk)	Number of representatives
Labour Party (Arbeidarpartiet)	3
Local List(s) (Lokale lister)	13
Total number of members:	16

Hordabø heradsstyre 1937–1941*
Party name (in Nynorsk)	Number of representatives
Labour Party (Arbeidarpartiet)	4
List of workers, fishermen, and small farmholders (Arbeidarar, fiskarar, småbrukarar liste)	1
Joint List(s) of Non-Socialist Parties (Borgarlege Felleslister)	1
Local List(s) (Lokale lister)	10
Total number of members:	16
Note: Due to the German occupation of Norway during World War II, no elections were held for new municipal councils until after the war ended in 1945.

=== Mayors ===
The mayor (Nynorsk: ordførar) of Hordabø Municipality was the political leader of the municipality and the chairperson of the municipal council. The following people held this position:

- 1924–1925: Bertin Insylta
- 1926–1928: Elias K. Marøen
- 1929–1947: Andreas Lamberg
- 1948–1951: Alfred Nordanger
- 1952–1955: Johannes G. Bøe
- 1955–1959: Alfred Nordanger
- 1959–1963: Johannes G. Bøe

== See also ==
- List of former municipalities of Norway
