= Manger Municipality =

Former municipality in Hordaland, Norway

Manger Municipality Manger herad
- Former municipality
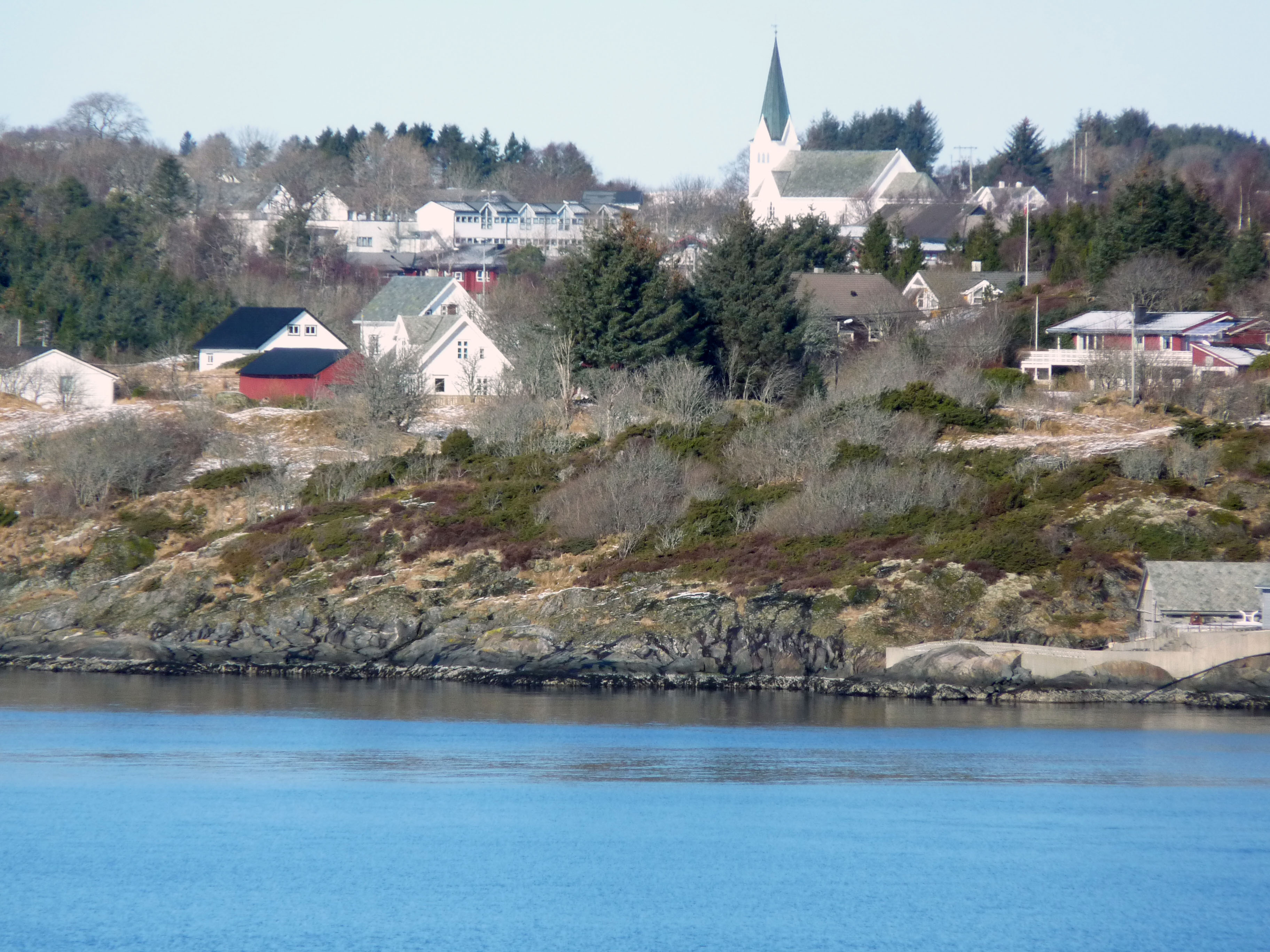
- View of the village of Manger

- Hordaland within Norway

- Manger within Hordaland
- Coordinates: 60°38′29″N 05°02′29″E
- Country: Norway
- County: Hordaland
- District: Nordhordland
- Established: 1 January 1838
  - Created as: Formannskapsdistrikt
- Disestablished: 1 January 1964
  - Succeeded by: Radøy Municipality
- Administrative centre: Manger

Government
  - Mayor (1960–1963): Wilhelm Kartveit

Area (upon dissolution)
  - Total: 33.9 km^{2} (13.1 sq mi)
  - Rank: #607 in Norway
- Highest elevation: 216.7 m (711 ft)

Population (1963)
  - Total: 1,328
  - Rank: #561 in Norway
  - Density: 39.2/km^{2} (102/sq mi)
  - Change (10 years): ▲ +1.4%

Official language
  - Norwegian form: Nynorsk
- Time zone: UTC+01:00 (CET)
  - Summer (DST): UTC+02:00 (CEST)
- ISO 3166 code: NO-1261

Manger is a former municipality in the old Hordaland county, Norway. The 33.9-square-kilometre (13.1 sq mi) municipality existed from 1838 until its dissolution in 1964. The area is now part of Alver Municipality in the traditional district of Nordhordland in Vestland county. The administrative centre was the village of Manger where Manger Church is located.

Prior to its dissolution in 1964, the 33.9-square-kilometre (13.1 sq mi) municipality was the 607th largest by area out of the 689 municipalities in Norway. Manger Municipality was the 561st most populous municipality in Norway with a population of about 1,328. The municipality's population density was 39.2 inhabitants per square kilometre (102/sq mi) and its population had increased by 1.4% over the previous 10-year period.

== General information ==
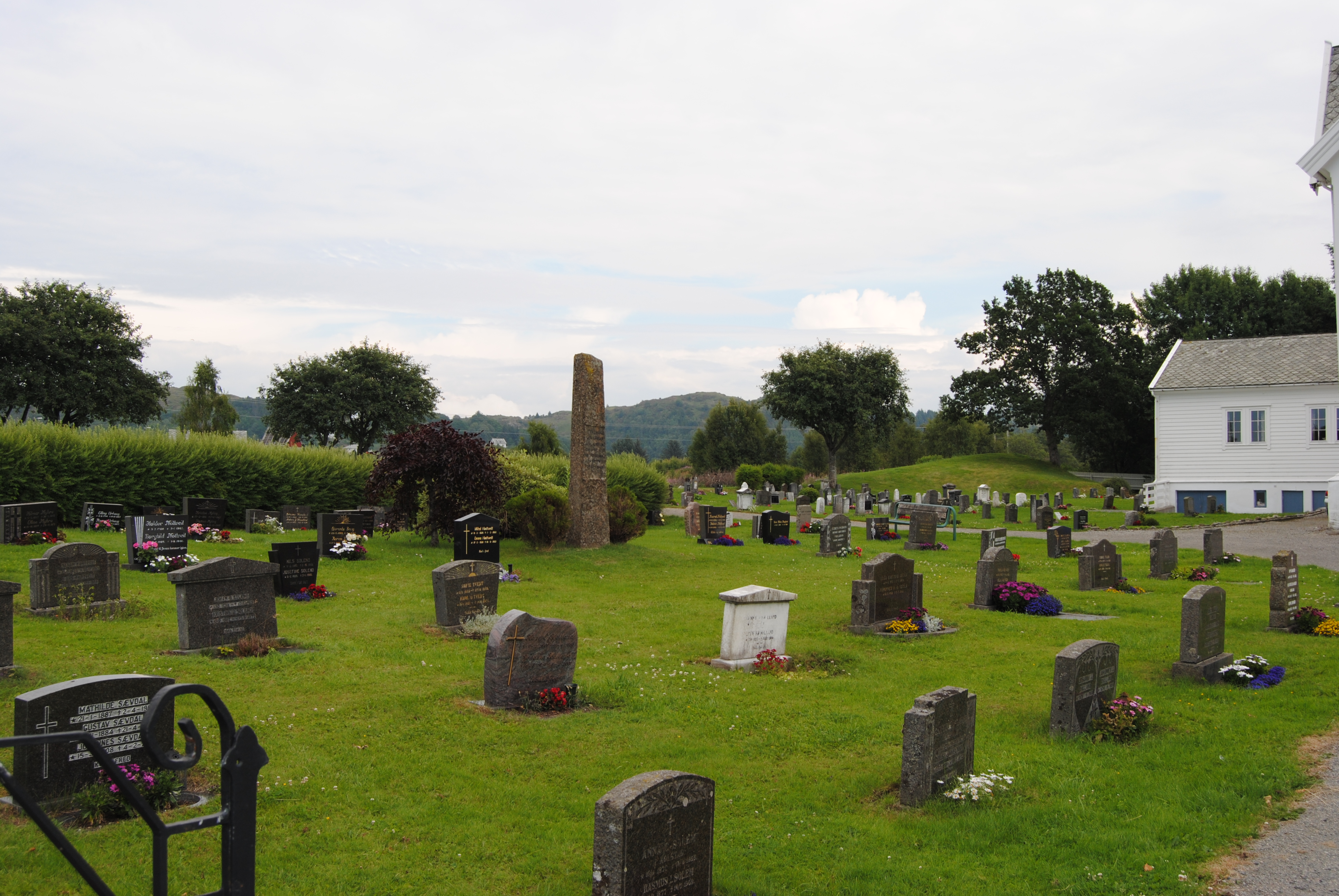
View of the Manger area surrounding the church

The parish of Manger was established as a municipality on 1 January 1838 (see formannskapsdistrikt law). On 1 January 1871, the northwestern island district (population: 2,484) was separated to form the new Herdla Municipality. This left Manger Municipality with a population of 4,364. Then on 1 January 1910, the rest of the islands in the western part of Manger Municipality (population: 986) was separated to form the new Hjelme Municipality. This left Manger Municipality with a population of 4,453.

On 1 July 1924, Manger Municipality was divided into three municipalities: Bø Municipality (population: 1,938) in the north, a much smaller Manger Municipality (population: 1,426) in the central part, and Sæbø Municipality (population: 1,125) in the south.

During the 1960s, there were many municipal mergers across Norway due to the work of the Schei Committee. On 1 January 1964, the municipality was dissolved and a merged with the following places to form the new Radøy Municipality.

- all of Manger Municipality (population: 1,344)
- all of Hordabø Municipality (population: 1,679)
- the island of Bogno from Herdla Municipality (population: 29)
- most of Sæbø Municipality, except the Titland area on the Lindås peninsula (population: 916)
- the Sletta area on the island of Radøy from Lindås Municipality (population: 305)
- the Straume area on the island of Radøy and the small island of Fesøy from Austrheim Municipality (population: 56)

=== Name ===
The municipality (originally the parish) is named after the old Manger farm (Old Norse: Mángr) since the first Manger Church was built there. The first element comes from the word már which means "seagull". The last element is angr which means "bay" or "inlet". Thus the name means "seagull bay".

=== Churches ===
The Church of Norway had one parish (sokn) within Manger Municipality. At the time of the municipal dissolution, it was part of the Manger prestegjeld and the Nordhordland prosti (deanery) in the Diocese of Bjørgvin.

Churches in Manger Municipality
Parish (sokn)	Church name	Location of the church	Year built
Manger	Manger Church	Manger	1891

== Geography ==
Manger unicipality originally included almost all of the island of Radøy, the northern part of the island of Holsnøy, and all the islands west of these areas all the way to the open sea. Over time, the municipality was reduced in size several times, so that by 1964, it was just the central part of the island of Radøy. The highest point in the municipality was the 216.7-metre (711 ft) tall mountain Morkefjellet.

Hordabø Municipality was located to the north, Lindås Municipality was located to the northeast, Sæbø Municipality was located to the southeast, Herdla Municipality was located to the south, and Hjelme Municipality was located to the west.

== Government ==
While it existed, Manger Municipality was responsible for primary education (through 10th grade), outpatient health services, senior citizen services, welfare and other social services, zoning, economic development, and municipal roads and utilities. The municipality was governed by a municipal council of directly elected representatives. The mayor was indirectly elected by a vote of the municipal council. The municipality was under the jurisdiction of the Gulating Court of Appeal.

=== Municipal council ===
The municipal council (Heradsstyre) of Manger Municipality was made up of 13 representatives that were elected to four year terms. The tables below show the historical composition of the council by political party.

Manger heradsstyre 1959–1963
Party name (in Nynorsk)	Number of representatives
Labour Party (Arbeidarpartiet)	2
Christian Democratic Party (Kristeleg Folkeparti)	3
Centre Party (Senterpartiet)	4
Liberal Party (Venstre)	3
Local List(s) (Lokale lister)	1
Total number of members:	13
Note: On 1 January 1964, Manger Municipality became part of Radøy Municipality.

Manger heradsstyre 1955–1959
Party name (in Nynorsk)	Number of representatives
Labour Party (Arbeidarpartiet)	2
Christian Democratic Party (Kristeleg Folkeparti)	3
Liberal Party (Venstre)	3
Local List(s) (Lokale lister)	5
Total number of members:	13

Manger heradsstyre 1951–1955
Party name (in Nynorsk)	Number of representatives
Labour Party (Arbeidarpartiet)	3
Christian Democratic Party (Kristeleg Folkeparti)	2
Liberal Party (Venstre)	2
Local List(s) (Lokale lister)	5
Total number of members:	12

Manger heradsstyre 1947–1951
Party name (in Nynorsk)	Number of representatives
Labour Party (Arbeidarpartiet)	2
Christian Democratic Party (Kristeleg Folkeparti)	2
Liberal Party (Venstre)	2
Local List(s) (Lokale lister)	6
Total number of members:	12

Manger heradsstyre 1945–1947
Party name (in Nynorsk)	Number of representatives
Labour Party (Arbeidarpartiet)	3
Christian Democratic Party (Kristeleg Folkeparti)	3
Liberal Party (Venstre)	3
Local List(s) (Lokale lister)	3
Total number of members:	12

Manger heradsstyre 1937–1941*
Party name (in Nynorsk)	Number of representatives
Labour Party (Arbeidarpartiet)	2
Farmers' Party (Bondepartiet)	1
Liberal Party (Venstre)	3
List of workers, fishermen, and small farmholders (Arbeidarar, fiskarar, småbrukarar liste)	4
Local List(s) (Lokale lister)	2
Total number of members:	12
Note: Due to the German occupation of Norway during World War II, no elections were held for new municipal councils until after the war ended in 1945.

=== Mayors ===
The mayor (Nynorsk: ordførar) of Manger Municipality was the political leader of the municipality and the chairperson of the municipal council. The following people held this position:

- 1838–1839: Ole Jacobsen Sjurtvedt
- 1840–1843: Jacob Waagenæs
- 1844–1845: Michael Sars
- 1846–1851: Ole Jacobsen Sjurtvedt
- 1852–1859: Gudmund N. Kolstad
- 1860–1861: Halvor Olsen Brudeknapsholmen
- 1862–1865: I.L. Kobro
- 1866–1871: Jacob Severin Kars
- 1872–1873: Magne Magnesen Solheim
- 1874–1875: Knut R. Askeland
- 1876–1881: Wilhelm Askeland
- 1882–1907: Hans Smith
- 1908–1910: Ole Maraas
- 1911–1913: Lauritz Johan A. Tvedt
- 1914–1916: Ole Maraas
- 1916–1928: Lauritz Johan A. Tvedt
- 1929–1934: Olav Eikenes
- 1935–1945: Karl G. Kolstad
- 1946–1947: Ragnvald Færøy
- 1948–1951: Lauritz Johan A. Tvedt
- 1952–1955: Sverre Kolstad
- 1956–1959: Otto Holmås
- 1960–1963: Wilhelm Kartveit

== See also ==
- List of former municipalities of Norway
