= Sæbø Municipality =

Former municipality in Hordaland, Norway

Sæbø Municipality Sæbø herad
- Former municipality
- Hordaland within Norway

- Sæbø within Hordaland
- Coordinates: 60°36′48″N 05°09′11″E
- Country: Norway
- County: Hordaland
- District: Nordhordland
- Established: 1 July 1924
  - Preceded by: Manger Municipality
- Disestablished: 1 Jan 1964
  - Succeeded by: Radøy Municipality
- Administrative centre: Sæbø

Government
  - Mayor (1948 1963): Benjamin Storheim

Area (upon dissolution)
  - Total: 27.2 km^{2} (10.5 sq mi)
  - Rank: #618 in Norway
- Highest elevation: 249 m (817 ft)

Population (1963)
  - Total: 946
  - Rank: #620 in Norway
  - Density: 34.8/km^{2} (90/sq mi)
  - Change (10 years): ▼ −6.6%
- Demonym(s): Sæbøsoknar; Sæbøsokner

Official language
  - Norwegian form: Nynorsk
- Time zone: UTC+01:00 (CET)
  - Summer (DST): UTC+02:00 (CEST)
- ISO 3166 code: NO-1262

Sæbø is a former municipality in the old Hordaland county, Norway. The 27-square-kilometre (10 sq mi) municipality existed from 1924 until its dissolution in 1964. The area is now part of Alver Municipality in the traditional district of Nordhordland in Vestland county. The administrative centre was the village of Sæbø, where Sæbø Church is located.

Prior to its dissolution in 1964, the 27.2-square-kilometre (10.5 sq mi) municipality was the 618th largest by area out of the 689 municipalities in Norway. Sæbø Municipality was the 620th most populous municipality in Norway with a population of about 946. The municipality's population density was 34.8 inhabitants per square kilometre (90/sq mi) and its population had decreased by 6.6% over the previous 10-year period.

== General information ==
The parish of Sæbø was established as a municipality on 1 July 1924 when the old Manger Municipality was divided into three municipalities: Bø Municipality (population: 1,938) in the north, a much smaller Manger Municipality (population: 1,426) in the central part, and Sæbø Municipality (population: 1,125) in the south.

During the 1960s, there were many municipal mergers across Norway due to the work of the Schei Committee. On 1 January 1964, the municipality was dissolved and a merged with the following places to form the new Radøy Municipality.

- most of Sæbø Municipality, except the Titland area on the Lindås peninsula (population: 916)
- all of Hordabø Municipality (population: 1,679)
- all of Manger Municipality (population: 1,344)
- the island of Bogno from Herdla Municipality (population: 29)
- the Sletta area on the island of Radøy from Lindås Municipality (population: 305)
- the Straume area on the island of Radøy and the small island of Fesøy from Austrheim Municipality (population: 56)

=== Name ===
The municipality (originally the parish) is named after the old Sæbø farm (Old Norse: Sæbœr) since the first Sæbø Church was built there. The first element comes from the word sær which means "sea" or "ocean". The last element is bœr which means "farm" or "farmstead". Thus, the name means "farm by the sea".

=== Churches ===
The Church of Norway had one parish (sokn) within Sæbø Municipality. At the time of the municipal dissolution, it was part of the Manger prestegjeld and the Nordhordland prosti (deanery) in the Diocese of Bjørgvin.

Churches in Sæbø Municipality
Parish (sokn)	Church name	Location of the church	Year built
Sæbø	Sæbø Church	Sæbø	1883

== Geography ==
Sæbø Municipality occupied the southern part of the island of Radøy, some small areas on the mainland Lindås peninsula, and some small areas on the island of Holsnøy. The highest point in the municipality was the 249-metre (817 ft) tall mountain Skarsveten on the border with Alversund Municipality.

Lindås Municipality was located to the north, Alversund Municipality was located to the east, Meland Municipality was located to the south, Herdla Municipality was located to the southwest, and Manger Municipality was located to the northwest.

== Government ==
While it existed, Sæbø Municipality was responsible for primary education (through 10th grade), outpatient health services, senior citizen services, welfare and other social services, zoning, economic development, and municipal roads and utilities. The municipality was governed by a municipal council of directly elected representatives. The mayor was indirectly elected by a vote of the municipal council. The municipality was under the jurisdiction of the Gulating Court of Appeal.

=== Municipal council ===
The municipal council (Heradsstyre) of Sæbø Municipality was made up of 13 representatives that were elected to four year terms. The tables below show the historical composition of the council by political party.

Sæbø heradsstyre 1959–1963
Party name (in Nynorsk)	Number of representatives
Labour Party (Arbeidarpartiet)	4
Christian Democratic Party (Kristeleg Folkeparti)	2
Centre Party (Senterpartiet)	5
Liberal Party (Venstre)	1
Local List(s) (Lokale lister)	1
Total number of members:	13
Note: On 1 January 1964, Sæbø Municipality became part of Radøy Municipality.

Sæbø heradsstyre 1955–1959
Party name (in Nynorsk)	Number of representatives
Labour Party (Arbeidarpartiet)	3
Christian Democratic Party (Kristeleg Folkeparti)	2
Farmers' Party (Bondepartiet)	6
Local List(s) (Lokale lister)	2
Total number of members:	13

Sæbø heradsstyre 1951–1955
Party name (in Nynorsk)	Number of representatives
Labour Party (Arbeidarpartiet)	2
Christian Democratic Party (Kristeleg Folkeparti)	3
Farmers' Party (Bondepartiet)	4
Local List(s) (Lokale lister)	3
Total number of members:	12

Sæbø heradsstyre 1947–1951
Party name (in Nynorsk)	Number of representatives
Labour Party (Arbeidarpartiet)	3
Christian Democratic Party (Kristeleg Folkeparti)	3
Farmers' Party (Bondepartiet)	2
Local List(s) (Lokale lister)	4
Total number of members:	12

Sæbø heradsstyre 1945–1947
Party name (in Nynorsk)	Number of representatives
Christian Democratic Party (Kristeleg Folkeparti)	2
List of workers, fishermen, and small farmholders (Arbeidarar, fiskarar, småbrukarar liste)	4
Joint List(s) of Non-Socialist Parties (Borgarlege Felleslister)	4
Local List(s) (Lokale lister)	2
Total number of members:	12

Sæbø heradsstyre 1937–1941*
Party name (in Nynorsk)	Number of representatives
Labour Party (Arbeidarpartiet)	4
Farmers' Party (Bondepartiet)	7
List of workers, fishermen, and small farmholders (Arbeidarar, fiskarar, småbrukarar liste)	1
Total number of members:	12
Note: Due to the German occupation of Norway during World War II, no elections were held for new municipal councils until after the war ended in 1945.

=== Mayors ===
The mayor (Nynorsk: ordførar) of Sæbø Municipality was the political leader of the municipality and the chairperson of the municipal council. The following people held this position:

- 1924–1925: Olav Maraas
- 1926–1928: Hans K. Askeland
- 1929–1948: Alfred O. Haukeland
- 1948–1963: Benjamin Storheim

== See also ==
- List of former municipalities of Norway
