= Haugland, Alver =

Village in Alver Municipality, Norway

Haugland
- Village
- Interactive map of Haugland
- Coordinates: 60.69448°N 4.9331°E
- Country: Norway
- Region: Western Norway
- County: Vestland
- District: Nordhordland
- Municipality: Alver Municipality

Area
  - Total: 0.76 km^{2} (0.29 sq mi)
- Elevation: 23 m (75 ft)

Population (2025)
  - Total: 406
  - Density: 534/km^{2} (1,380/sq mi)
- Time zone: UTC+01:00 (CET)
  - Summer (DST): UTC+02:00 (CEST)
- Post Code: 5937 Bøvågen

Haugland is a small village in Alver Municipality in Vestland county, Norway. The village is located just east of the village of Bøvågen on the northern part of the island of Radøy. Prior to 2020, the village was part of Radøy Municipality.

Statistics Norway considers the neighboring village of Bøvågen to be part of the same urban area as Haugland. The 0.76-square-kilometre (190-acre) village (including Bøvågen) has a population (2025) of 406 and a population density of 534 inhabitants per square kilometre (1,380/sq mi).
