= Olav Steinar Namtvedt =

Norwegian politician (born 1947)

Olav Steinar Namtvedt (born 9 April 1947) is a Norwegian politician for the Centre Party.

He served as a deputy representative to the Norwegian Parliament from Hordaland during the terms 1993–1997 and 2001–2005. On the local level he was the mayor of Radøy Municipality until 2007.
