= Emigrant Church, Sletta =

Church in Vestland, Norway

Emigrant Church at Sletta
- Emigrantskyrkje på Sletta
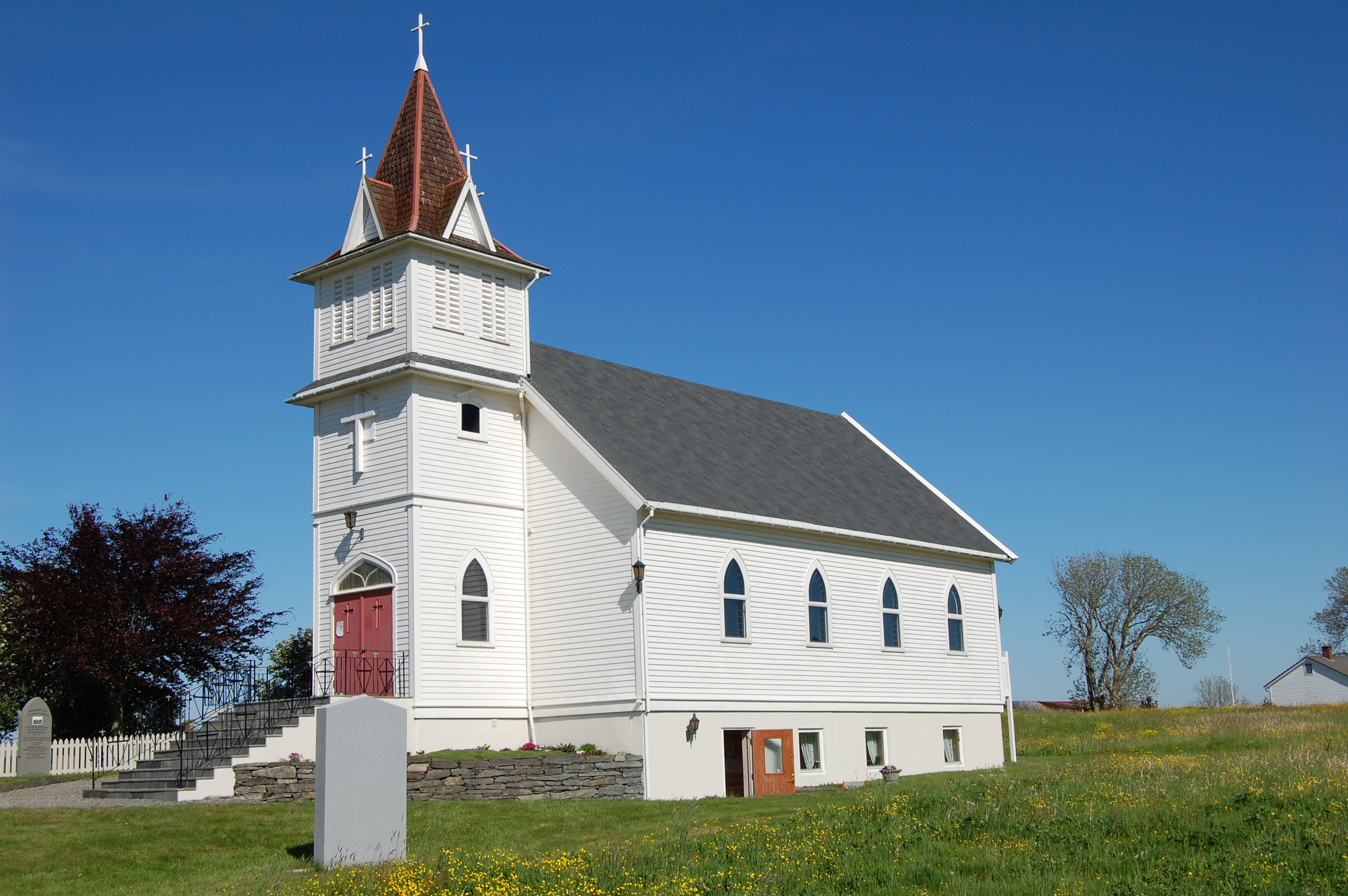
- View of the church
- Emigrant Church at Sletta
- 60°41′04″N 5°03′06″E
- Location: Alver Municipality, Vestland
- Country: Norway
- Denomination: Church of Norway
- Previous denomination: Catholic Church
- Churchmanship: Evangelical Lutheran

History
- Former name: Brampton Lutheran Church
- Status: Chapel
- Founded: 1997
- Consecrated: 1997
- Events: Moved to Sletta in 1997

Architecture
- Functional status: Active
- Architectural type: Long church
- Completed: 1921 (105 years ago)

Specifications
- Capacity: 150
- Materials: Wood

Administration
- Diocese: Bjørgvin bispedømme
- Deanery: Nordhordland prosti
- Parish: Radøy

The Emigrant Church at Sletta (Norwegian: Emigrantkyrkja på Sletta) is a chapel of the Church of Norway in Alver Municipality in Vestland county, Norway. It is located in the village of Sletta, but it originally stood in Brampton Township in the state of North Dakota in the United States. It is an annex chapel in the Radøy parish which is part of the Nordhordland prosti (deanery) in the Diocese of Bjørgvin.

The white, wooden church was built in the early 1900s in the rural township of Brampton in the US state of North Dakota. The small Lutheran Church existed for many decades until it closed. In 1997, a group of Norwegian-Americans in North Dakota gave the church to a group of Norwegians who wanted to move it to Norway. It now stands on the island of Radøy as part of the Western Norway Emigration Center. The church was consecrated in 1997 by the Bishop Ole Danbolt Hagesæther, and it was given the name Emigrantkirka på Sletta.

== Media gallery ==
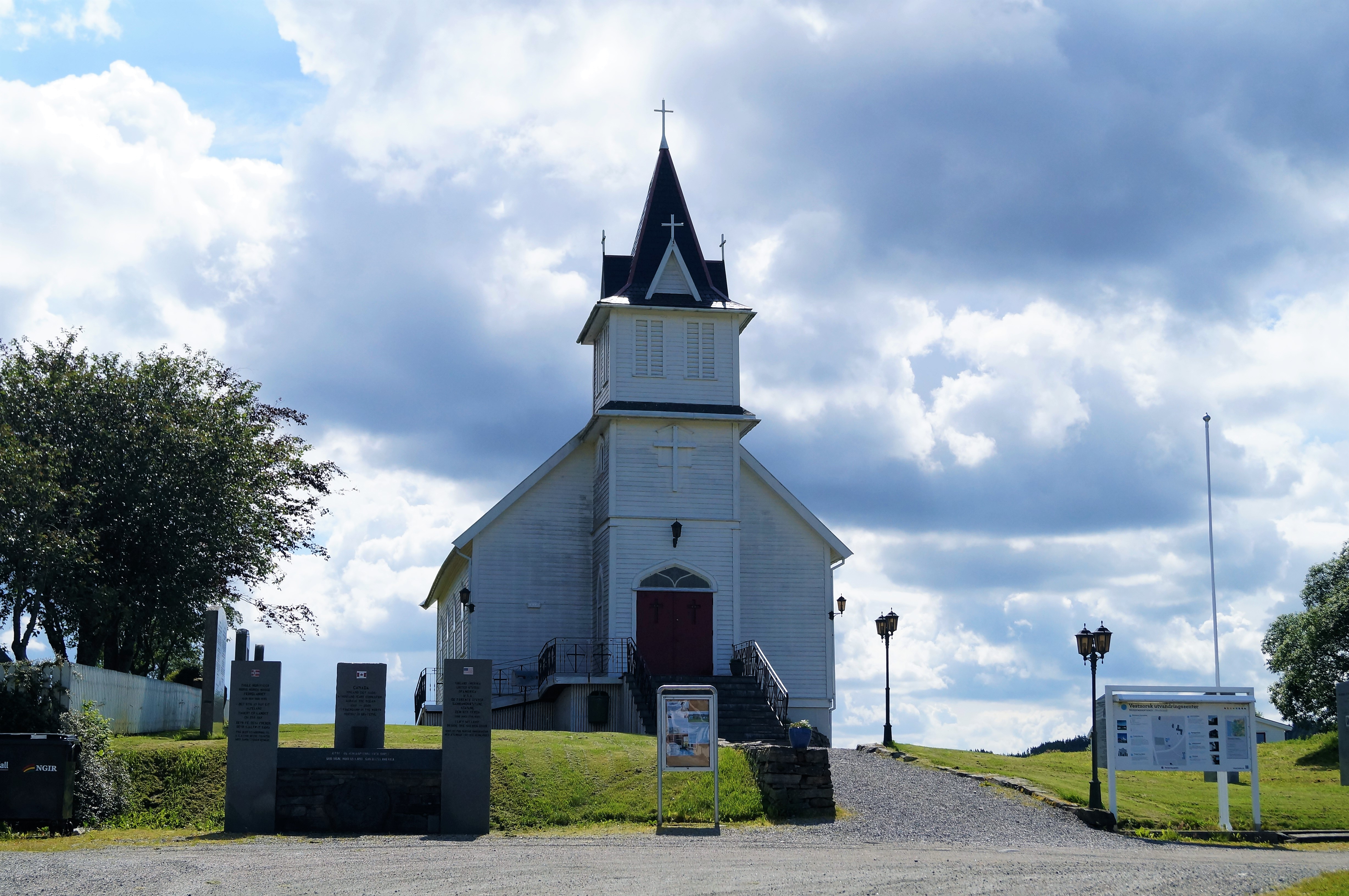

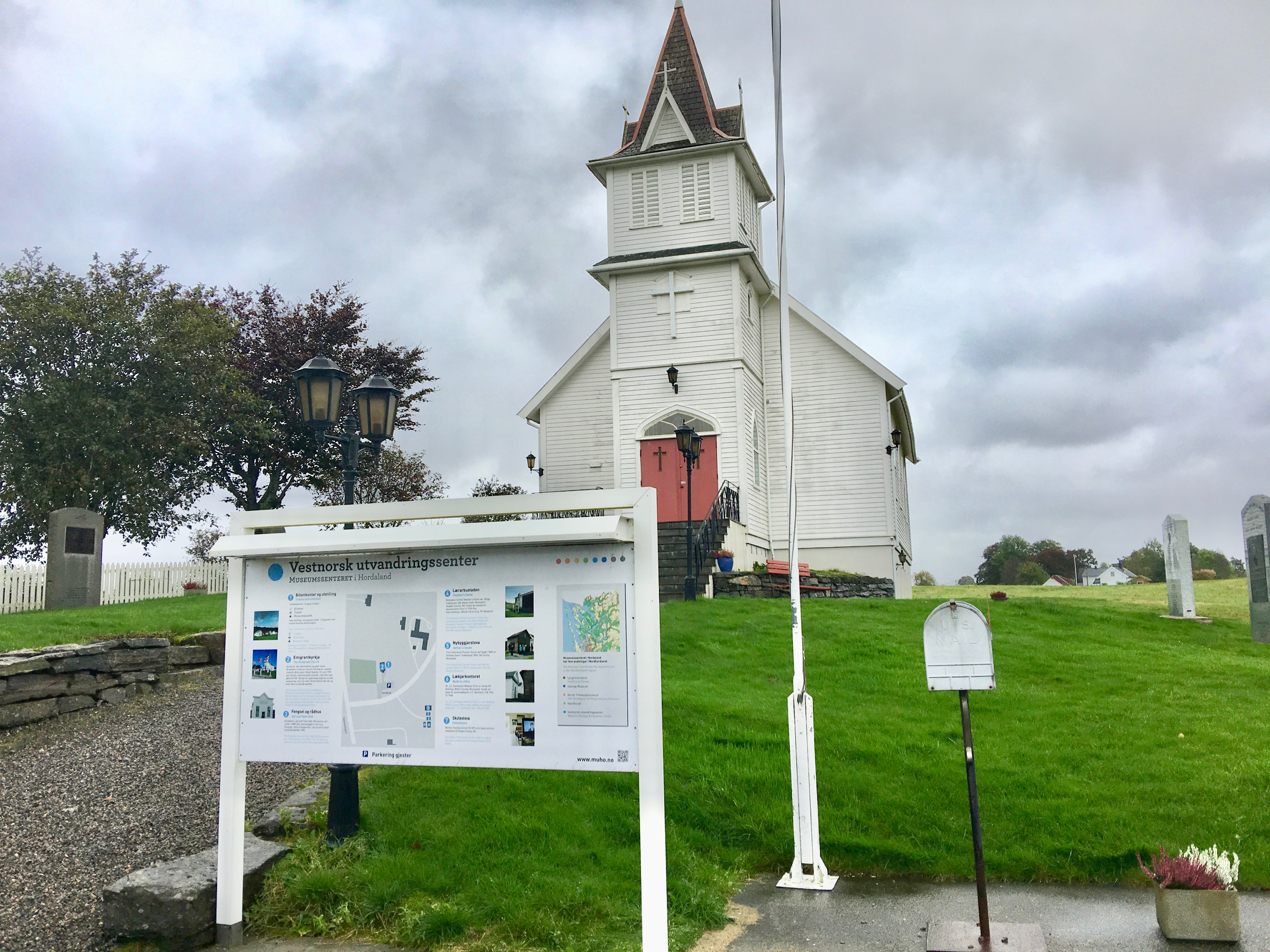

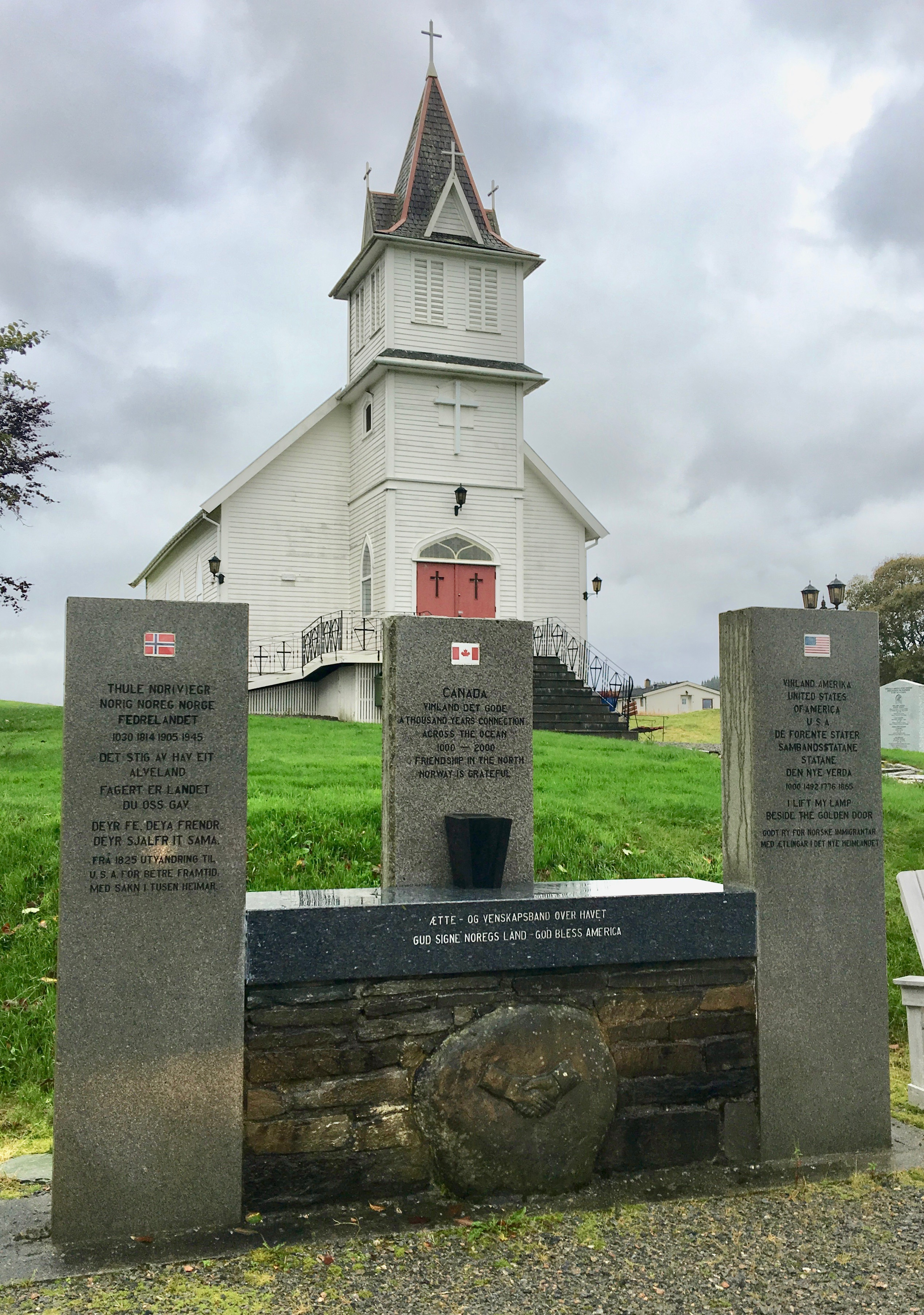

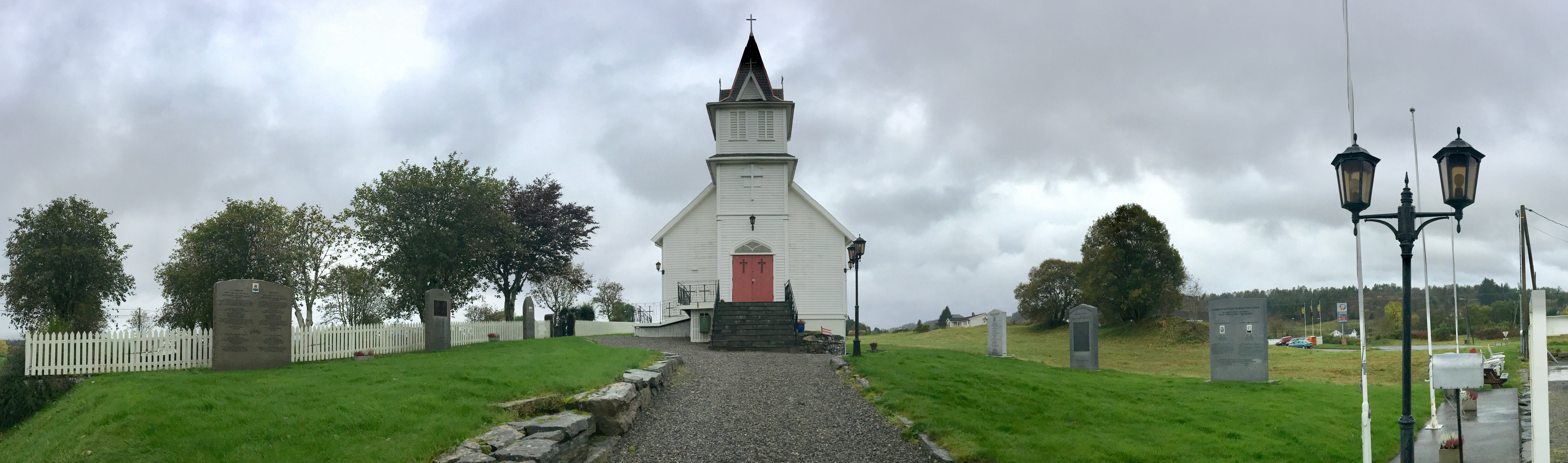

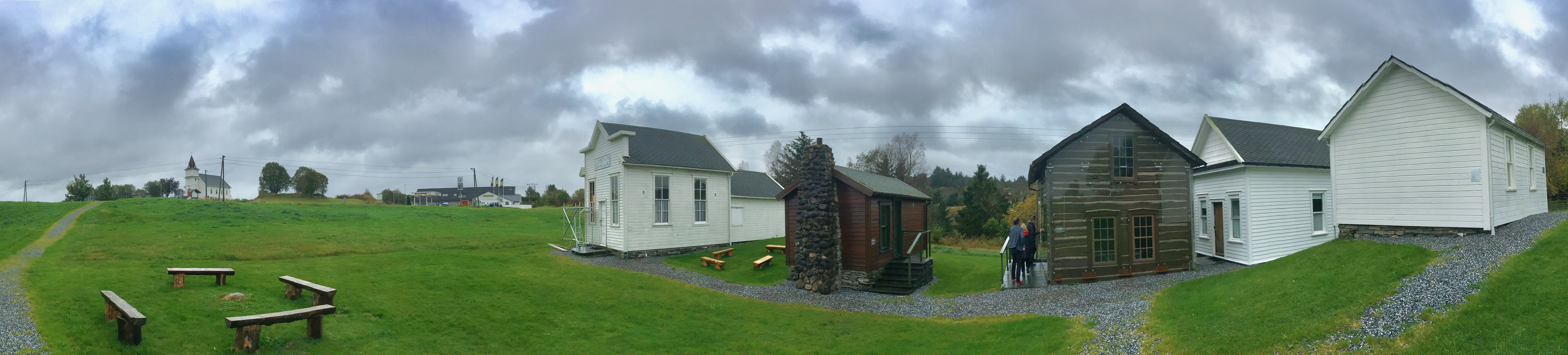

== See also ==
- List of churches in Bjørgvin
