= Toska =

Island in Vestland, Norway

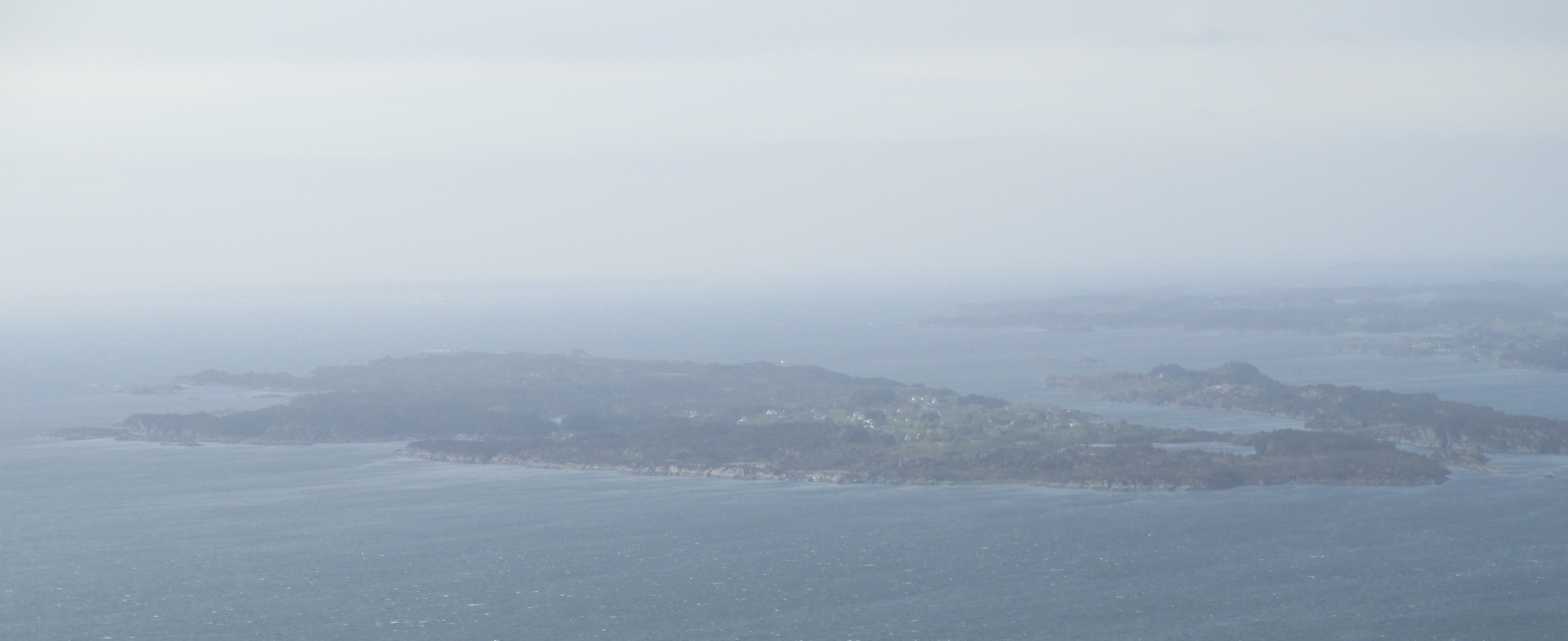
- View of the island
- Interactive map of Toska

Geography
- Location: Vestland, Norway
- Coordinates: 60.6483°N 4.9442°E
- Area: 5 km^{2} (1.9 sq mi)
- Length: 6.6 km (4.1 mi)
- Width: 1 km (0.6 mi)

Administration
- Norway
- County: Vestland
- Municipality: Alver Municipality

Toska is an island in Alver Municipality in Vestland county, Norway. The 5-square-kilometre (1.9 sq mi) island lies just west of the island of Radøy in the Hjeltefjorden, at the entrance to the Radfjorden.

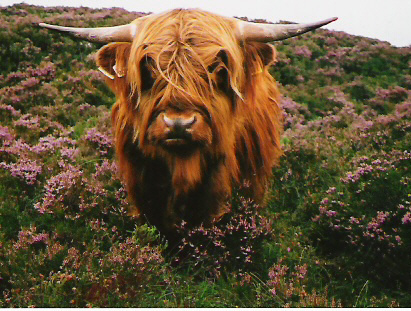
View of a local cow

A road connection from the village of Manger (on the island of Radøy) to the island of Toska was completed in 1989. The island is a popular holiday destination. Toska has about 40 inhabitants, mostly living in the village of Toska, also known as Vestevågen.

There are still a few farmers left on the island, but most residents work in other professions, with many commuting to neighboring villages and even to the city of Bergen.

== See also ==
- List of islands of Norway
