= Sæbø Church =

Church in Vestland, Norway

- Sæbø kyrkje
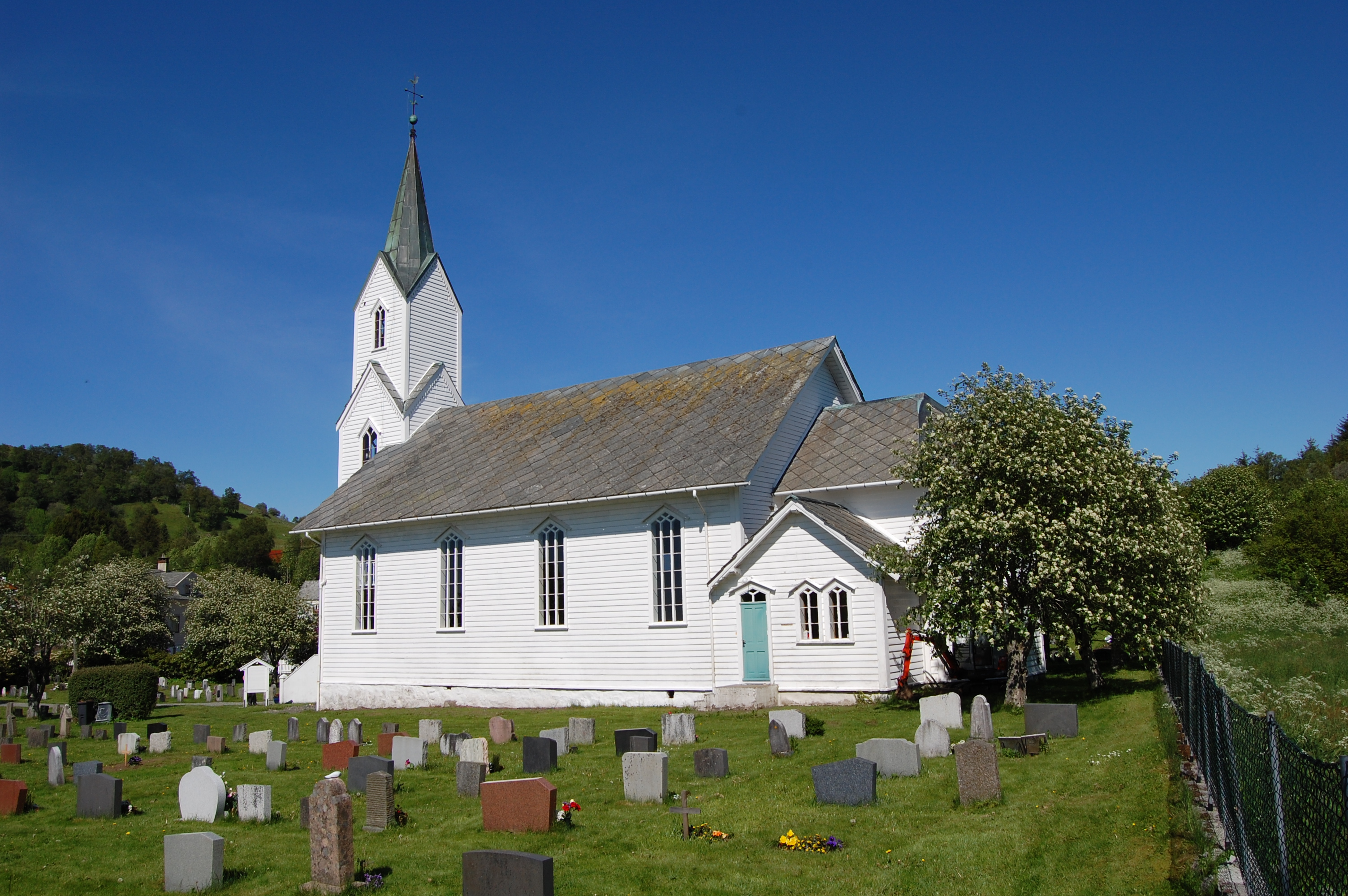
- View of the church
- Sæbø Church
- 60°36′45″N 5°09′10″E
- Location: Alver Municipality, Vestland
- Country: Norway
- Denomination: Church of Norway
- Previous denomination: Catholic Church
- Churchmanship: Evangelical Lutheran

History
- Status: Parish church
- Founded: 13th century
- Consecrated: 20 May 1884

Architecture
- Functional status: Active
- Architect: Karl Askeland
- Architectural type: Long church
- Completed: 1884 (142 years ago)

Specifications
- Capacity: 330
- Materials: Wood

Administration
- Diocese: Bjørgvin bispedømme
- Deanery: Nordhordland prosti
- Parish: Radøy
- Norwegian Cultural Heritage Site
- Type: Church
- Status: Not protected
- ID: 85030

Sæbø Church (Norwegian: Sæbø kyrkje) is a parish church of the Church of Norway in Alver Municipality in Vestland county, Norway. It is located in the village of Sæbø on the island of Radøy. It is one of the four churches in the Radøy parish which is part of the Nordhordland prosti (deanery) in the Diocese of Bjørgvin. The white, wooden church was built in a long church style in 1883 using designs by the architect Karl Askeland. The church seats about 330 people.

== History ==
The earliest existing historical records of the church date back to the year 1329, but it was not new that year. The first church was a wooden stave church that was likely built during the 13th century (due to the fact that the baptismal font is dated to the 1200s). The church was originally dedicated to St. Botolf. In 1634, the old church was torn down and replaced with a new timber-framed building. In 1696–1698, the church porch and tower above it were repaired. In an inspection in 1719, the church is described as being in very poor condition. That same year, the roof and tower were removed and completely rebuilt. At that time, the nave measured about 11.3 by 8.2 metres (37 ft × 27 ft) and the choir measured about 6.3 by 7 metres (21 ft × 23 ft). In March 1884, the old church was torn down and work began on a new church on the same site. The new church was consecrated on 20 May 1884 and it stands slightly to the southeast of the old location. The tower and western entrance of the present church stands where the former building's eastern chancel was located.

== Media gallery ==
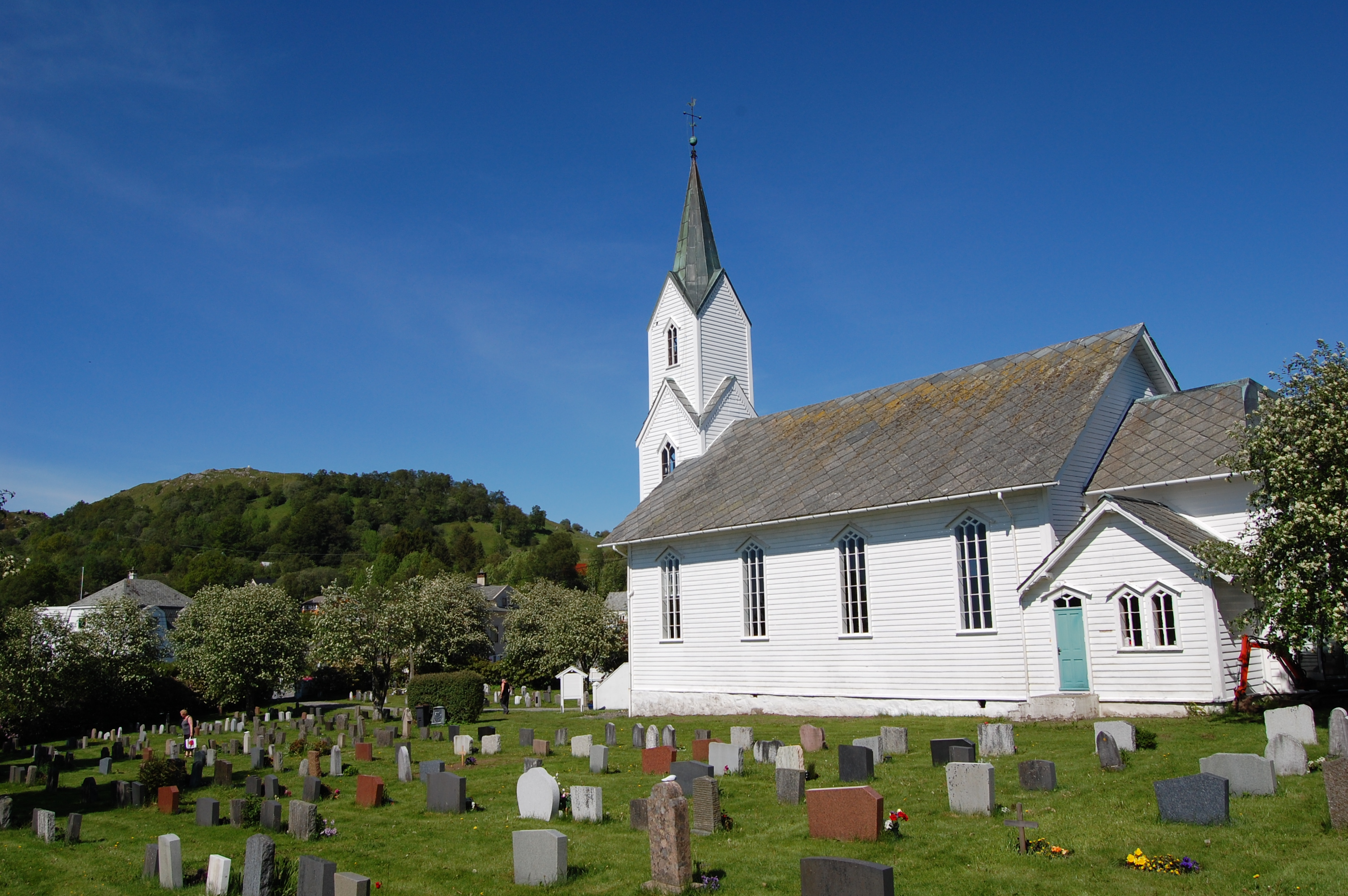

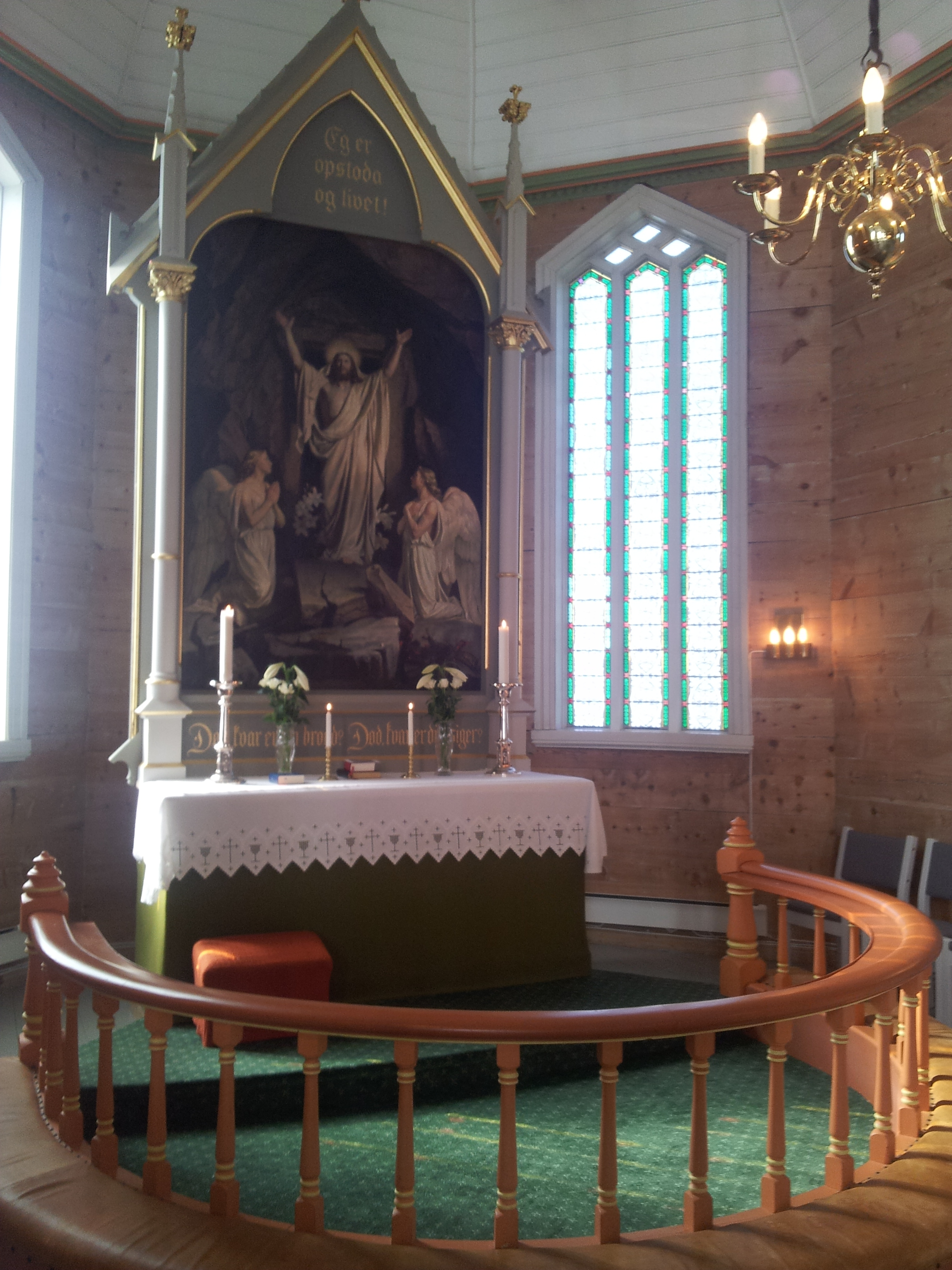

== See also ==
- List of churches in Bjørgvin
- Informationen zur Jehmlich Orgel in der Kirche von Saebø
