= William Manger (disambiguation) =

William Manger is an American sound editor.

William Manger (or variants) may also refer to:

- Bill Manger (1900–1958), Australian rules football player
- William M. Manger, Jr., in United States House of Representatives elections, 2004
- William Manger (general), American Secretary General of the Organization of American States
- William Manger (1865–1928), Co-founder of the Manger Hotels
