= Sletta, Vestland =

Village in Alver Municipality, Norway

Sletta
- Village
- Interactive map of Sletta
- Coordinates: 60.68861°N 5.045°E
- Country: Norway
- Region: Western Norway
- County: Vestland
- District: Nordhordland
- Municipality: Alver Municipality
- Elevation: 27 m (89 ft)
- Time zone: UTC+01:00 (CET)
  - Summer (DST): UTC+02:00 (CEST)
- Post Code: 5939 Sletta

Sletta is a rural linear village in Alver Municipality in Vestland county, Norway. The village lies on the northern side of the island of Radøy about a 50-minute drive north of the city of Bergen. There are about 400 inhabitants in the Sletta area. It is the site of the Emigrant Church, Sletta.

== Geography ==
The green island of Radøy is an elongated island with parallel fjords and valleys, which were created during the Devonian period. Sletta is not an exception, and has flower fields and the flat and steep landscape is excellent for sheep. The area is rich on spruce (especially sitka spruce), pine, and rowan.

== History ==
As Radøy was historically divided amongst several municipalities, Sletta was a part of Lindås Municipality until 1964. Since Sletta lies on a different side of the Lurefjorden than the rest of Lindås, the easiest transport was by boat. It was even better than walking over the hills to Manger and the rest of Radøy. The people at Sletta actually felt more in common with the people on the other side of the fjord. As the car became an important travel method, it became easier to get to the village of Manger. In 1964, almost all of the island of Radøy was merged into Radøy Municipality including Sletta.

== Culture ==
Sletta has a primary school with approximately 50 pupils. In addition, the main football field at Radøy, is situated at Sletta. Radøy/Manger is the main football team. The local community hall Skogen Sletta, has arranged many parties, which was very popular in the 1980s.
