= Bøvågen =

Village in Alver Municipality, Norway

- Village
- Interactive map of Bøvågen
- Coordinates: 60.69903°N 4.92818°E
- Country: Norway
- Region: Western Norway
- County: Vestland
- District: Nordhordland
- Municipality: Alver Municipality
- Elevation: 13 m (43 ft)
- Time zone: UTC+01:00 (CET)
  - Summer (DST): UTC+02:00 (CEST)
- Post Code: 5937 Bøvågen

Bøvågen is a small village in Alver Municipality in Vestland county, Norway. It is located on the northern part of the island of Radøy, about 10 kilometres (6.2 mi) northwest of the village of Manger. Hordabø Church is located in the village.

== History ==
From 1924 until 1964, it was the administrative centre of the old Hordabø Municipality.

Bøvågen has had various industry over the years. Originally it was a fishing village, but more recently it has been home to a plant belonging to the industrial company Sverre Munck Elektro-Mekanisk Industri.
