= Manger Church =

Church in Vestland, Norway

- Manger kyrkje
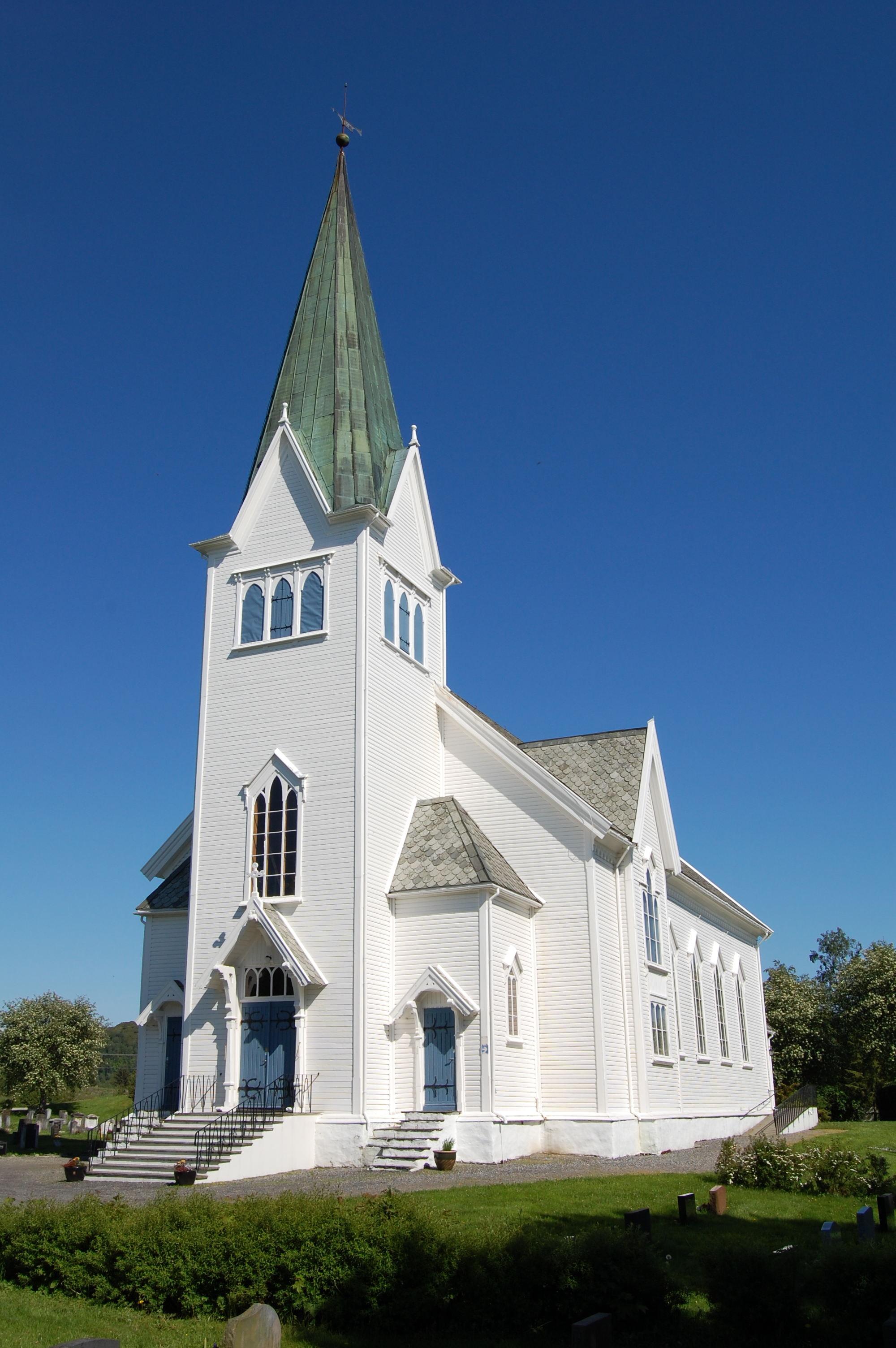
- View of the church
- Manger Church
- 60°38′29″N 5°02′33″E
- Location: Alver Municipality, Vestland
- Country: Norway
- Denomination: Church of Norway
- Previous denomination: Catholic Church
- Churchmanship: Evangelical Lutheran

History
- Status: Parish church
- Founded: 12th century
- Consecrated: 27 October 1891

Architecture
- Functional status: Active
- Architect: Hans Heinrich Jess
- Architectural type: Long church
- Completed: 1891 (135 years ago)

Specifications
- Capacity: 440
- Materials: Wood

Administration
- Diocese: Bjørgvin bispedømme
- Deanery: Nordhordland prosti
- Parish: Radøy
- Norwegian Cultural Heritage Site
- Type: Church
- Status: Listed
- ID: 84386

Manger Church (Norwegian: Manger kyrkje) is a parish church of the Church of Norway in Alver Municipality in Vestland county, Norway. It is located in the village of Manger on the island of Radøy. It is one of the four churches in the Radøy parish which is part of the Nordhordland prosti (deanery) in the Diocese of Bjørgvin. The white, wooden church was built in a long church style in 1891 using designs by the architect Hans Heinrich Jess who was from Bergen. The church seats about 440 people.

== History ==
The earliest existing historical records of the church date back to the year 1350, but it was not new that year. The first church in Manger was a wooden stave church that was likely built during the 12th century. Around the year 1600, the old church was torn down and replaced with a new building on the same site. In 1648-1649 a major repair was done on the tower. In 1685, the church underwent a major repair of the roof, exterior siding, and floor. In 1724, the church was sold by the state to the local parish priest, Hans Withe. This happened during the Norwegian church auction when the King was trying to raise money to pay off debts from the Great Northern War. On 18 January 1738, a lightning strike hit the church and the structure burned down. After the fire, the site was cleared and planning began for a new building. This time, the parish chose to build a stone building. Work on the new church began in 1741 and it was completed in 1743. The new building was consecrated on 5 November 1743. The new church was a rectangular long church with a choir and nave that had the same width and height. Above the west gable stood a small tower. The church had room for 91 standing and 180 seated people.

In 1814, this church served as an election church (Norwegian: valgkirke). Together with more than 300 other parish churches across Norway, it was a polling station for elections to the 1814 Norwegian Constituent Assembly which wrote the Constitution of Norway. This was Norway's first national elections. Each church parish was a constituency that elected people called "electors" who later met together in each county to elect the representatives for the assembly that was to meet at Eidsvoll Manor later that year.

Again in 1822, the church caught fire by a lightning strike. This damaged the tower and part of the masonry structure, but the damage was not severe and it was quickly repaired. In 1885, the church was sold back to the municipality from private ownership. Immediately afterwards, the parish decided that the church was too small, and it needed to be enlarged. After some planning, it was determined that enlarging the old church would be more expensive than tearing it down and building a new wooden church. In 1891, the old church was torn down and replaced by a new wooden one. The architect Hans Heinrich Jess from Bergen was commissioned to make the architectural drawings and Karl Askeland was hired to lead the construction work. The new church was consecrated on 27 October 1891. In 1950-1957, the northern sacristy was replaced with an addition that included a church hall with a kitchen and hallway.

== Media gallery ==
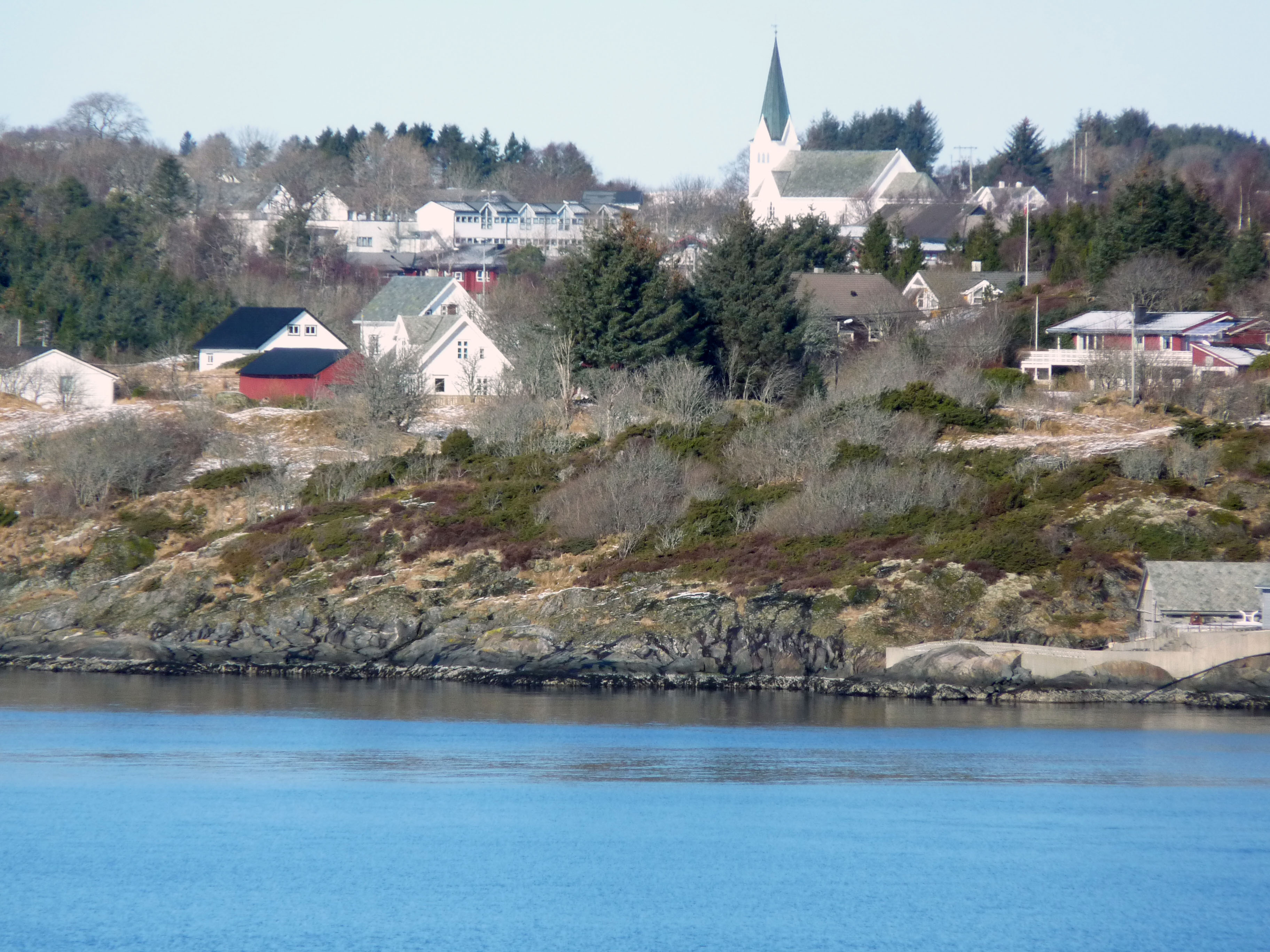

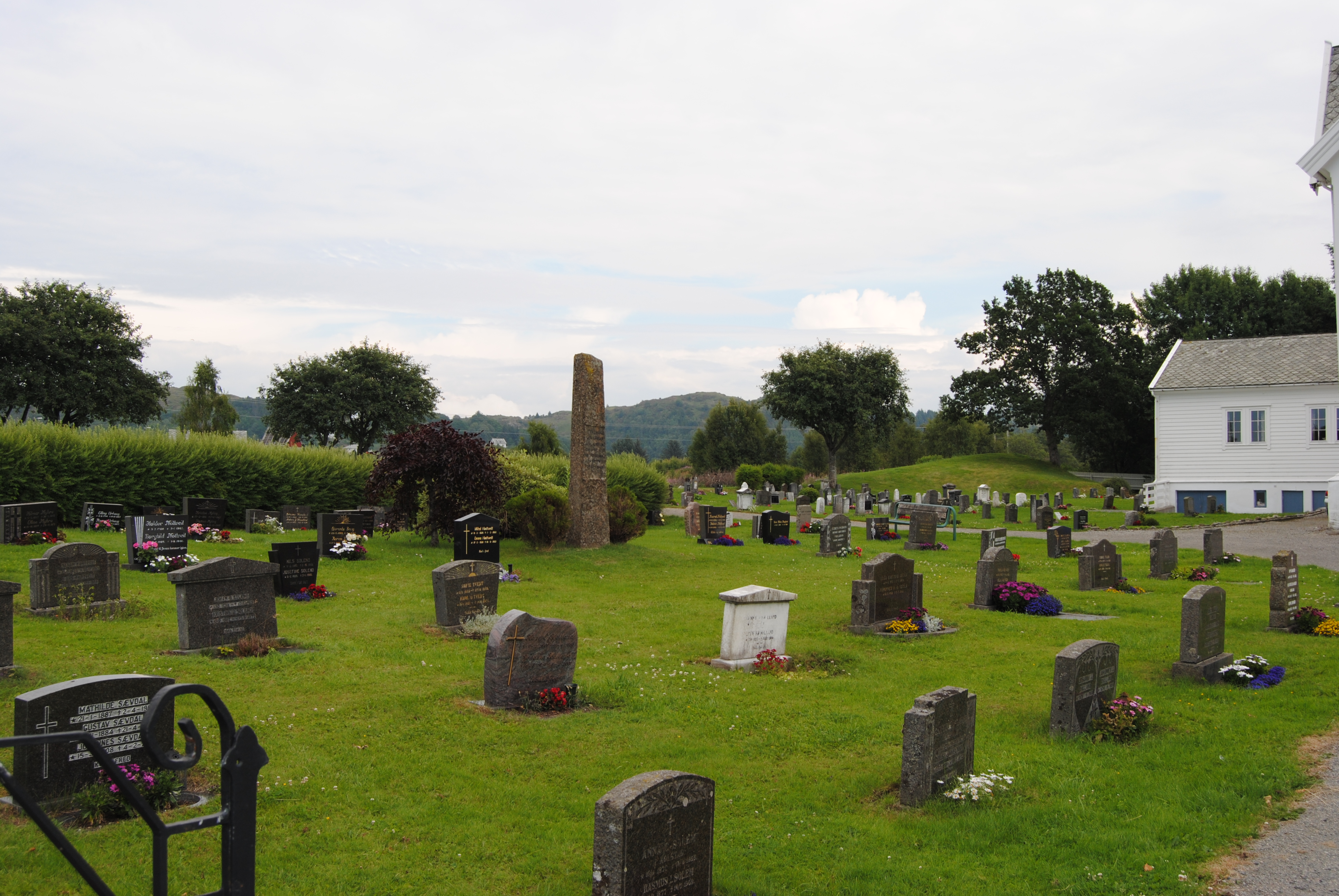

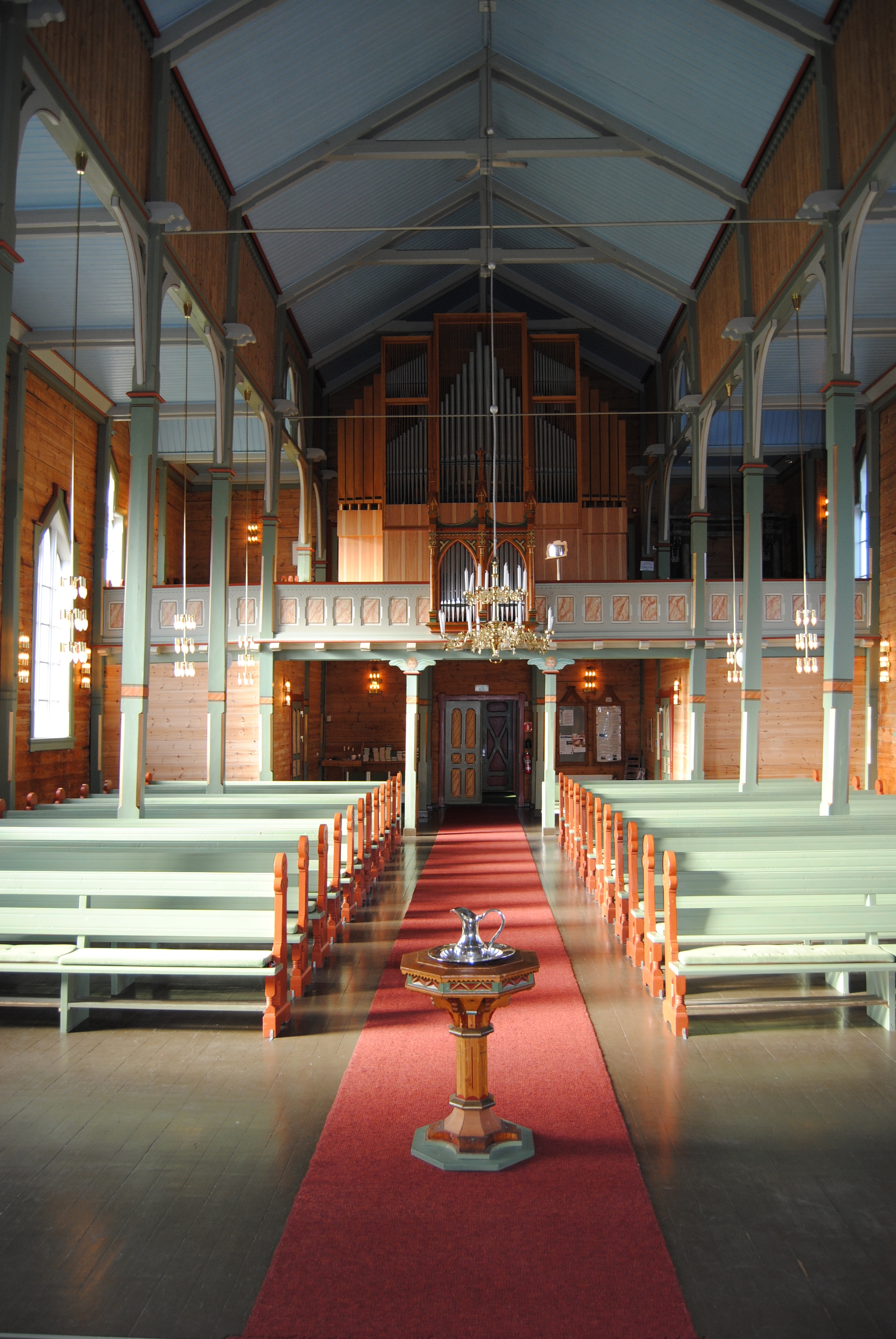

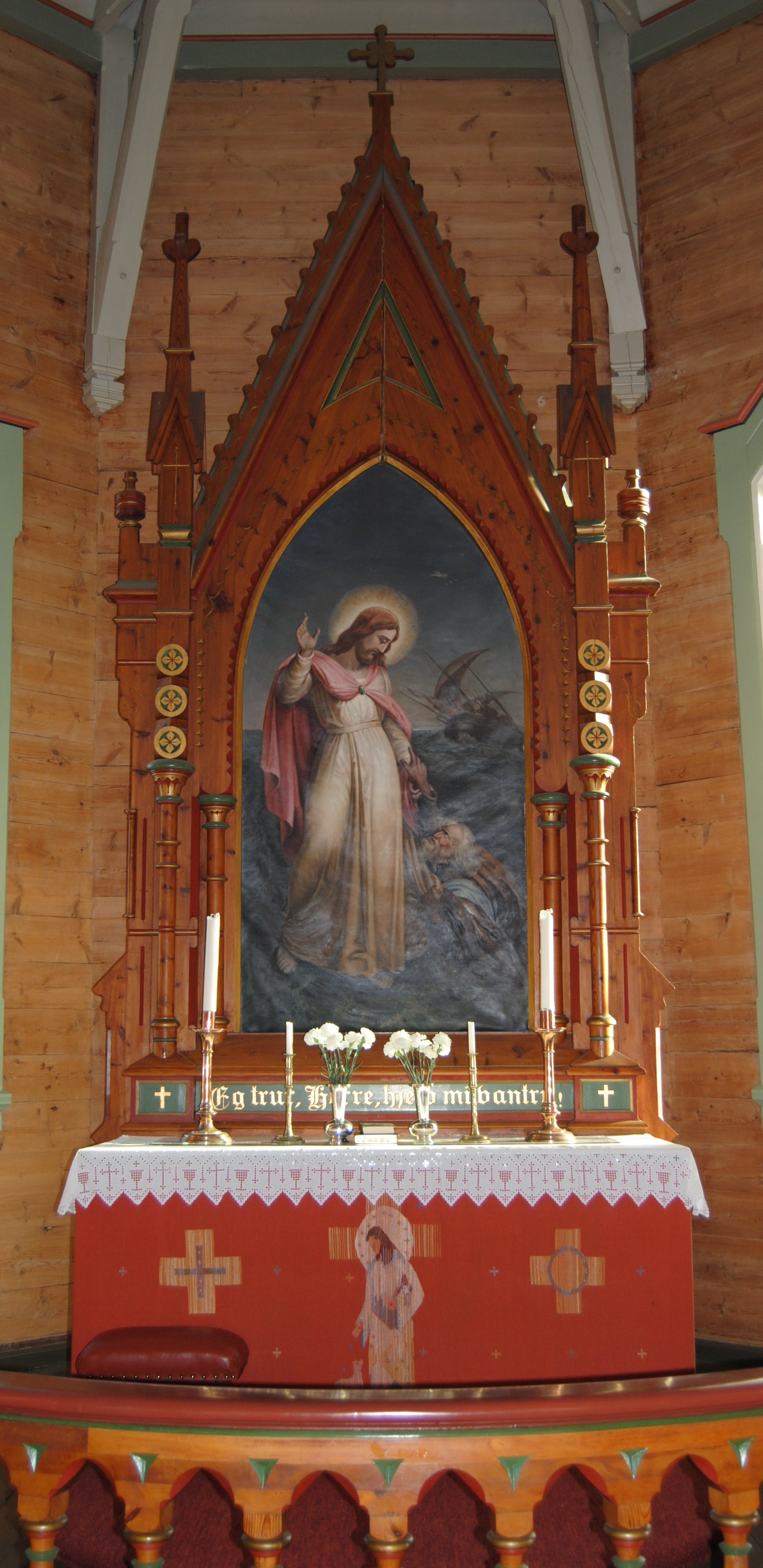

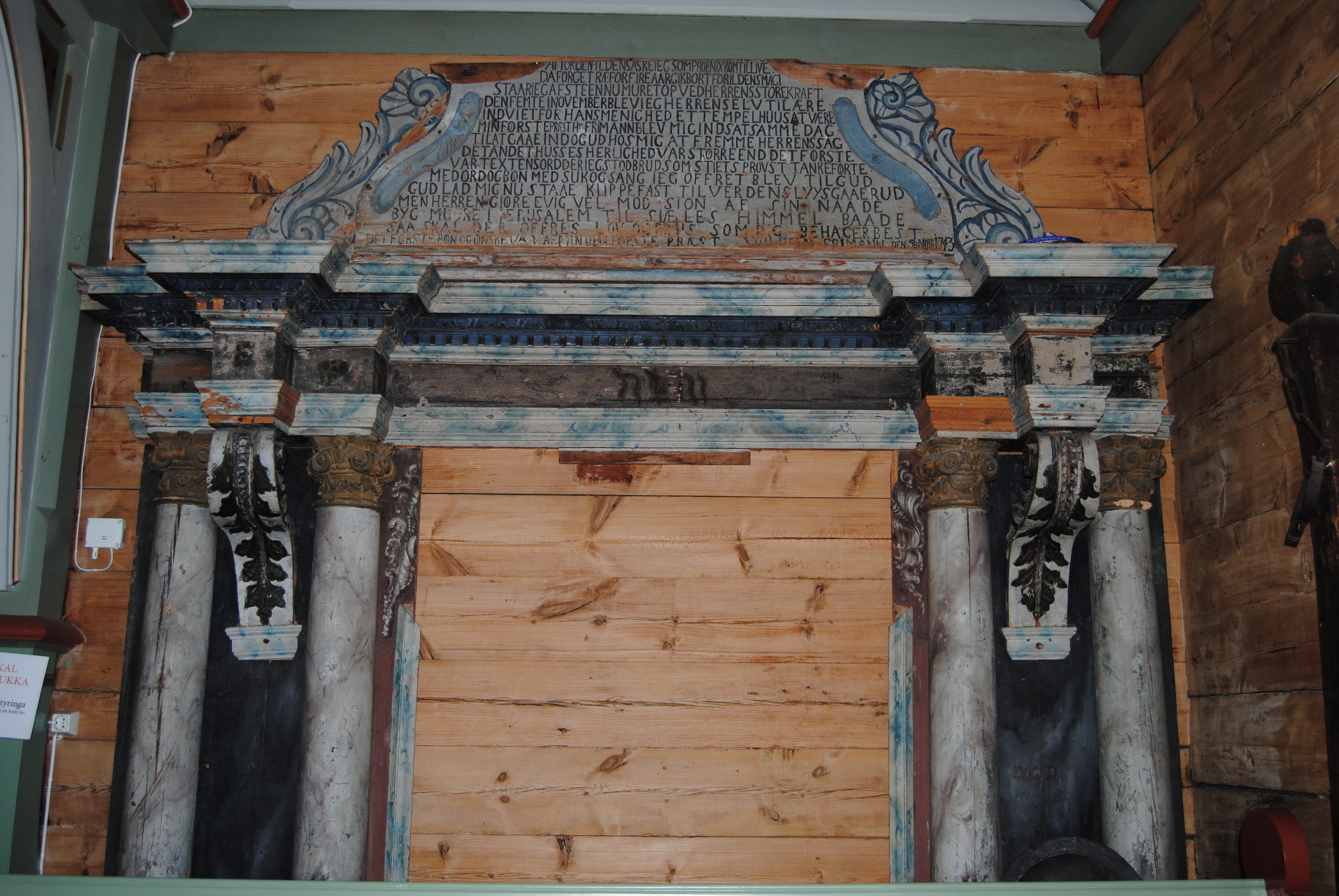

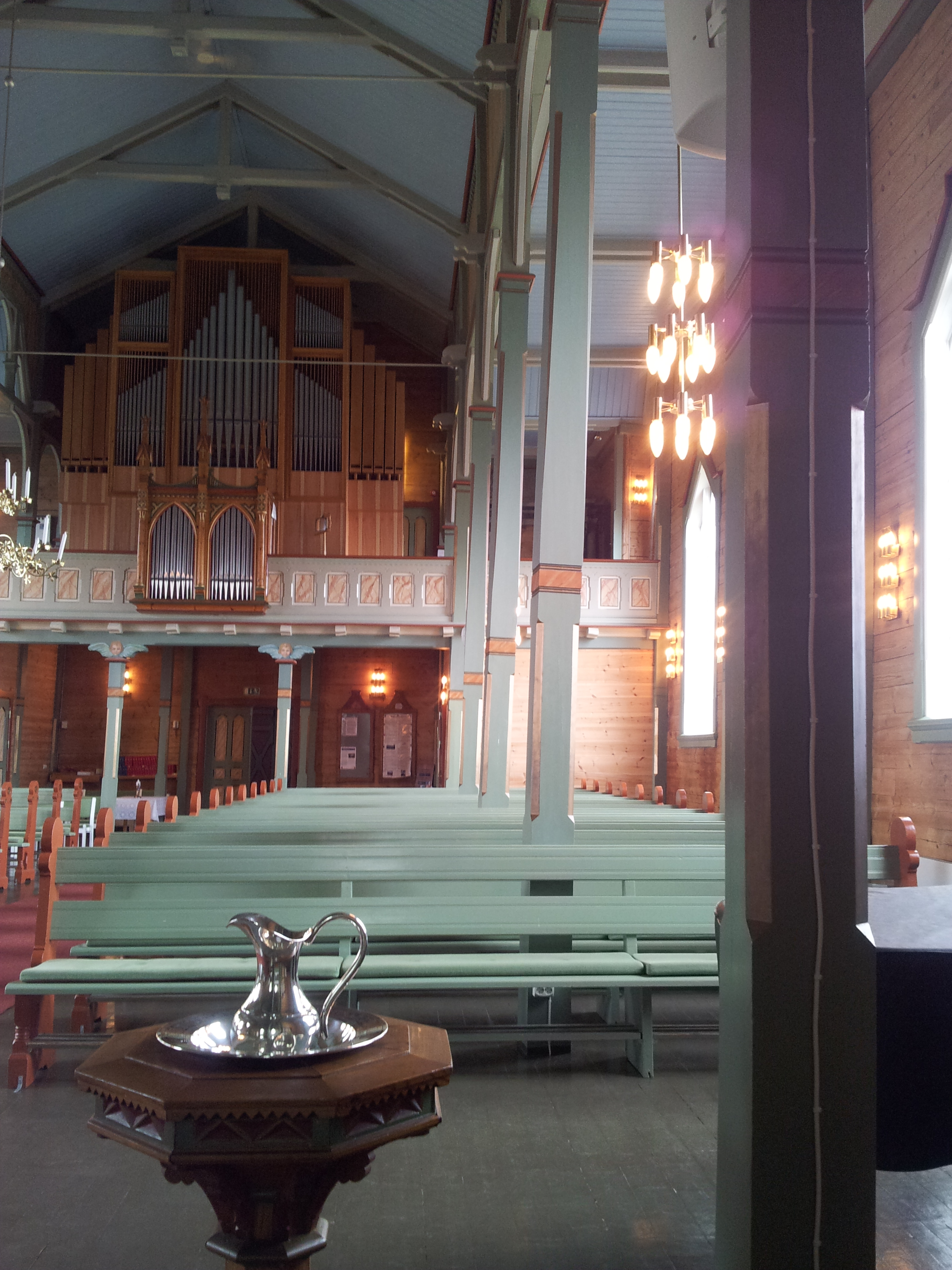

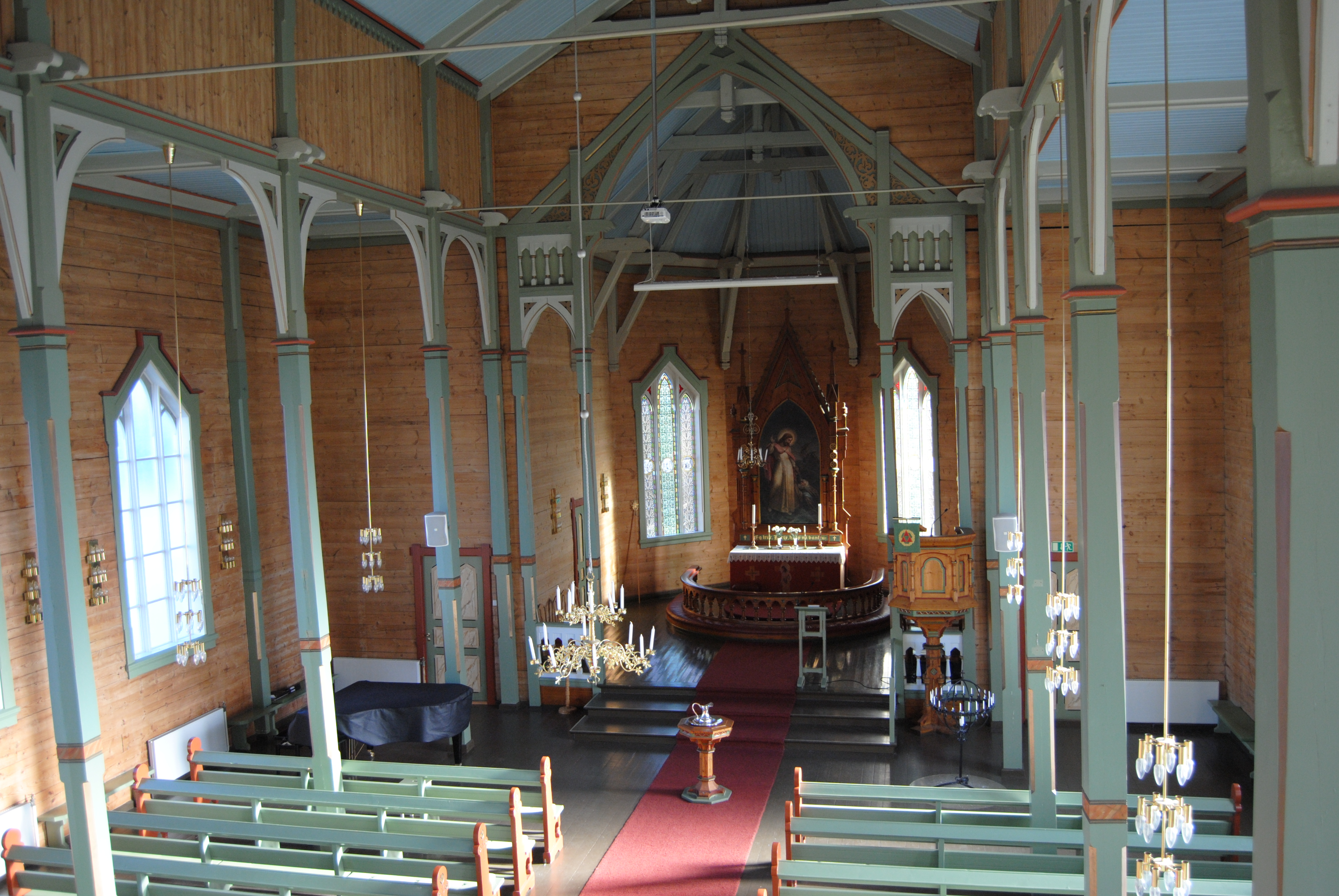

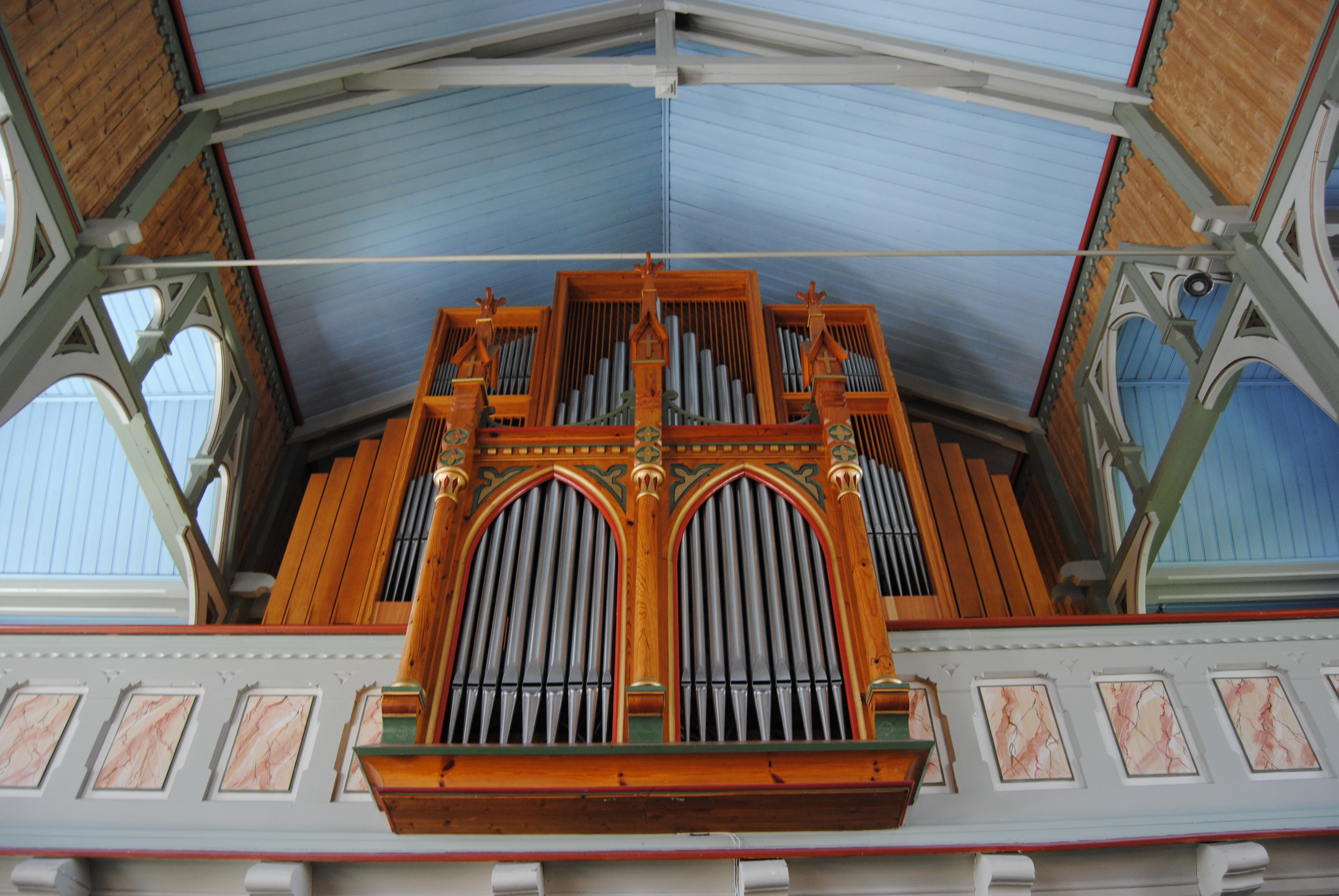

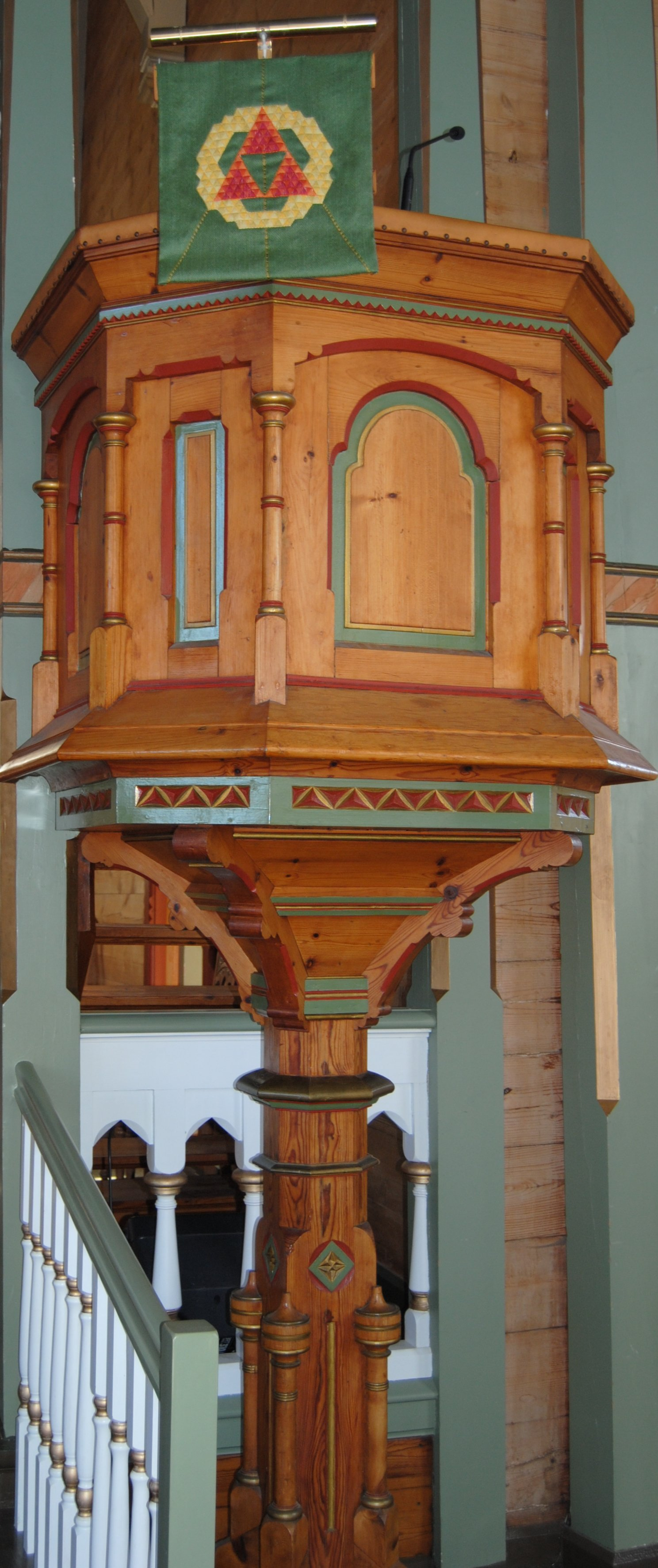

== See also ==
- List of churches in Bjørgvin
