= Sæbø, Vestland =

Village in Alver Municipality, Norway

Sæbø
- Village
- Interactive map of Sæbø
- Coordinates: 60.61353°N 5.15333°E
- Country: Norway
- Region: Western Norway
- County: Vestland
- District: Nordhordland
- Municipality: Alver Municipality
- Elevation: 70 m (230 ft)
- Time zone: UTC+01:00 (CET)
  - Summer (DST): UTC+02:00 (CEST)
- Post Code: 5938 Sæbøvågen

Sæbø is a village in Alver Municipality in Vestland county, Norway. The village is located along the Radfjorden on the southern coast of the island of Radøy, about 1.5 kilometres (0.93 mi) west of the village of Austmarka and about 8.5 kilometres (5.3 mi) south of the village of Manger.

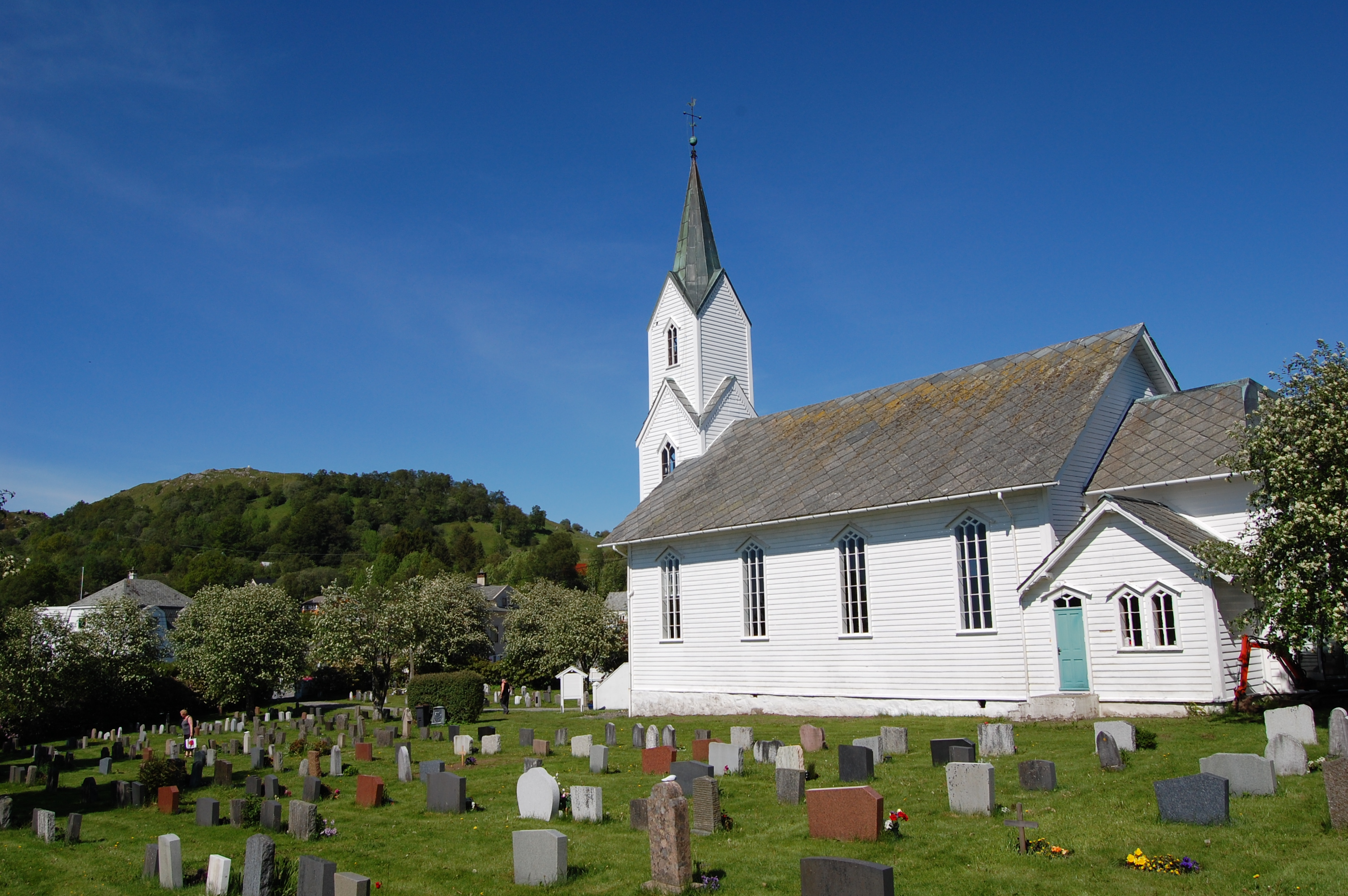
View of the local church

The village is the site of Sæbø Church which serves the southern part of the island of Radøy.

== History ==
Sæbø was the administrative centre of the old Sæbø Municipality which existed from 1924 until 1964.
