= Manger, Norway =

Village in Alver Municipality, Norway

Manger
- Village
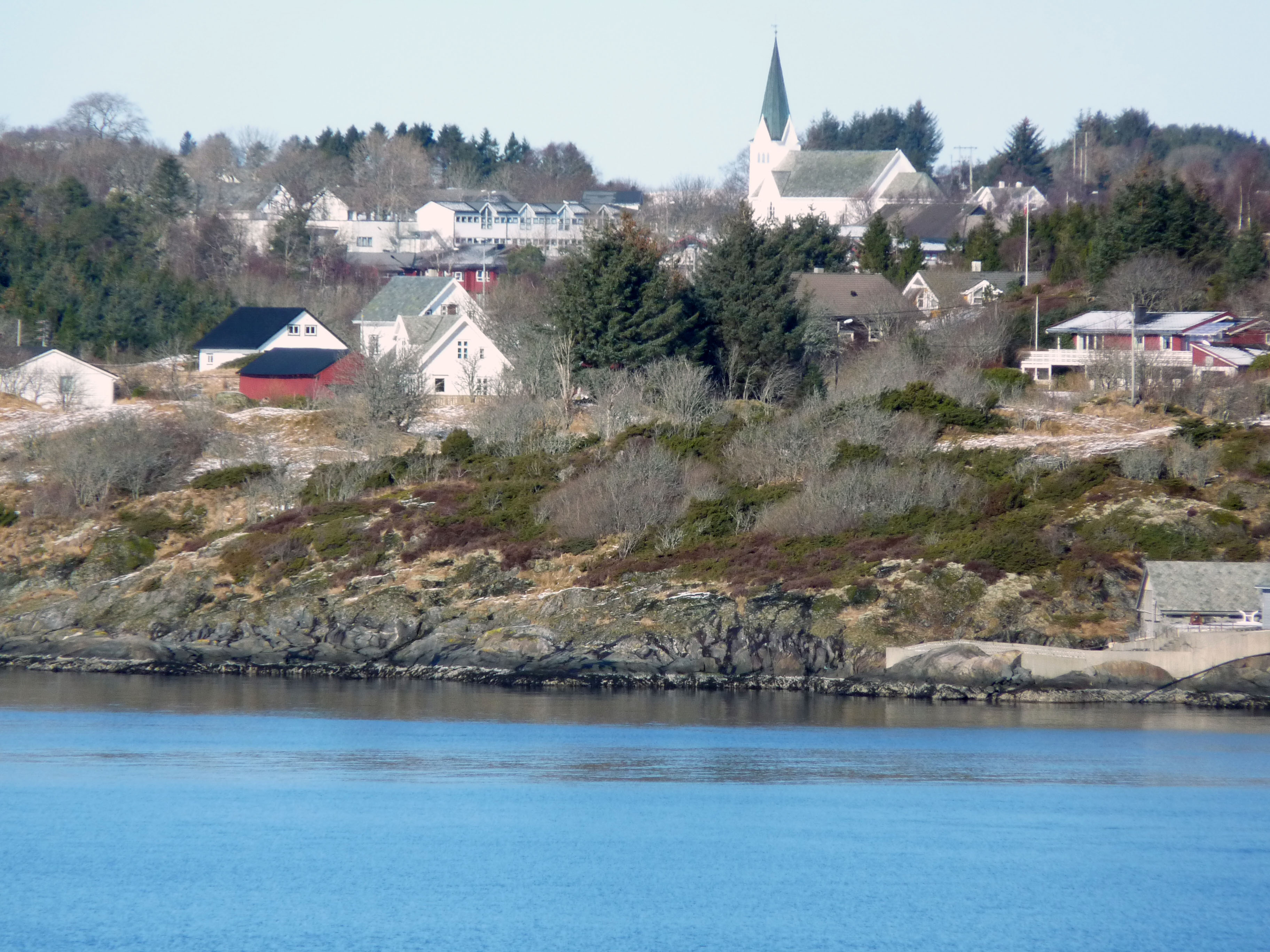
- View of the village with Manger Church
- Interactive map of Manger
- Coordinates: 60.64144°N 5.0414°E
- Country: Norway
- Region: Western Norway
- County: Vestland
- District: Nordhordland
- Municipality: Alver Municipality

Area
  - Total: 1.05 km^{2} (0.41 sq mi)
- Elevation: 32 m (105 ft)

Population (2025)
  - Total: 1,142
  - Density: 1,088/km^{2} (2,820/sq mi)
- Time zone: UTC+01:00 (CET)
  - Summer (DST): UTC+02:00 (CEST)
- Post Code: 5936 Manger

Manger is a village in Alver Municipality in Vestland county, Norway. The village lies in the central part of the island of Radøy, along the Radfjorden. The villages of Bøvågen and Haugland lie about 10 kilometres (6.2 mi) to the northwest and the village of Sæbø lies about 10 kilometres (6.2 mi) to the southeast. Manger Church is located in the village.

The 1.05-square-kilometre (260-acre) village has a population (2025) of 1,142 and a population density of 1,088 inhabitants per square kilometre (2,820/sq mi).

== History ==
From 1838 until 1964, the village of Manger was the administrative center of the old Manger Municipality. Then after a municipal merger, the village became the administriative centre of the newly-created Radøy Municipality which existed from 1964 until its dissolution in 2020 when it became part of Alver Municipality.
