= Radøy (island) =

Island in Vestland county, Norway

- Interactive map of Radøy

Geography
- Location: Vestland, Norway
- Coordinates: 60.6907°N 4.9973°E
- Area: 101.3 km^{2} (39.1 sq mi)
- Length: 27 km (16.8 mi)
- Width: 6.5 km (4.04 mi)
- Highest elevation: 217 m (712 ft)
- Highest point: Morkefjellet

Administration
- Norway
- County: Vestland
- Municipality: Alver Municipality

Demographics
- Population: 6,176 (2017)
- Pop. density: 61/km^{2} (158/sq mi)

Radøy is an island in Alver Municipality in Vestland county, Norway. The 101.3-square-kilometre (39.1 sq mi) island is located east of Fedjefjorden. The highest point of the island is the 217-metre (712 ft) tall Morkefjellet.

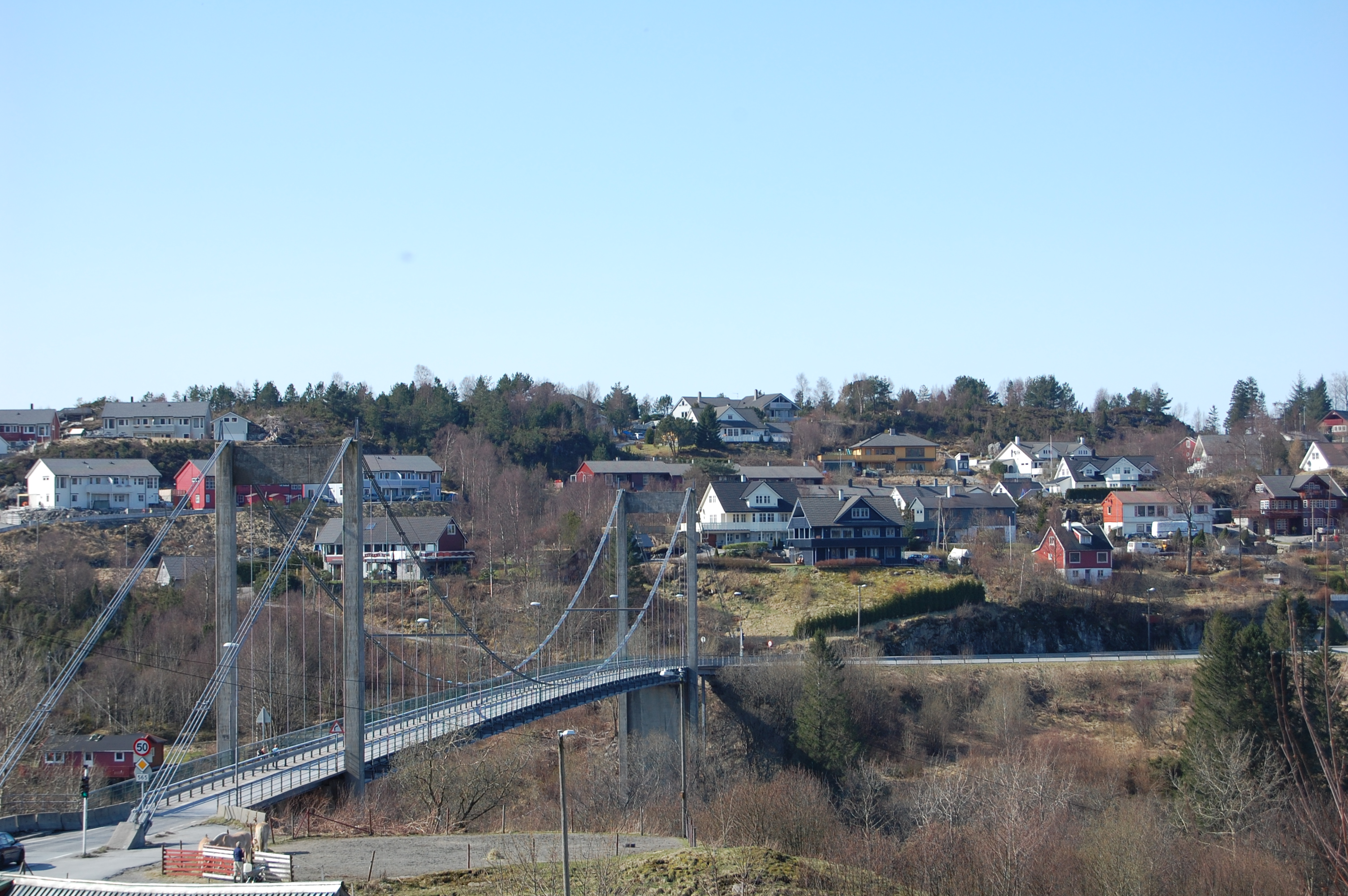
The suspension bridge connecting Radøy to the mainland.

The island lies in the Nordhordland region of the county. The Hjeltefjorden and Radfjorden flow along the western coast and the Lurefjorden and Radsundet flow along the eastern coast. The island of Fosnøyna lies to the north of Radøy, the island of Toska lies to the west, the island of Holsnøy lies to the south, and the Lindås peninsula lies to the east.

The island had a population of 6,176 inhabitants in 2017, with the largest urban areas being the village of Manger on the west-central coast and the village of Bøvågen on the northern coast. Radøy is connected to the mainland via the Alversund Bridge on the southern tip of the island.

== History ==
Historically, most of the island was part of the old Manger Municipality from 1838 until 1924 when it was divided into three municipalities: Hordabø Municipality, Manger Municipality, and Sæbø Municipality. Another part of the island was part of Austrheim Municipality in the north, and a small part of the island was part of Alversund Municipality in the south. In 1964, a major municipal merger took place, almost all of the island became part of the newly-established Radøy Municipality (with the rest being part of Lindås Municipality. In 2020, the whole island became part of the new Alver Municipality.

== See also ==
- List of islands of Norway
