= Hjelme Municipality =

Former municipality in Hordaland, Norway

Hjelme Municipality Hjelme herred
- Former municipality
- Hjelmen herred (historic name)
- Hordaland within Norway

- Hjelme within Hordaland
- Coordinates: 60.6481°N 4.8183°E
- Country: Norway
- County: Hordaland
- District: Nordhordland
- Established: 1 Jan 1910
  - Preceded by: Manger Municipality
- Disestablished: 1 Jan 1964
  - Succeeded by: Øygarden Municipality
- Administrative centre: Hjelme

Area (upon dissolution)
  - Total: 18.95 km^{2} (7.32 sq mi)
  - Rank: #628 in Norway
- Highest elevation: 54.5 m (179 ft)

Population (1963)
  - Total: 989
  - Rank: #614 in Norway
  - Density: 52.2/km^{2} (135/sq mi)
  - Change (10 years): ▼ −4.6%
- Demonym: Hjelmesokning

Official language
  - Norwegian form: Neutral
- Time zone: UTC+01:00 (CET)
  - Summer (DST): UTC+02:00 (CEST)
- ISO 3166 code: NO-1259

Hjelme is a former municipality in the old Hordaland county, Norway. The 19-square-kilometre (7.3 sq mi) municipality existed from 1910 until its dissolution in 1964. The area is now part of Øygarden Municipality in the traditional district of Nordhordland in Vestland county. The administrative centre was the village of Hjelmo where the Old Hjelme Church is located.

Prior to its dissolution in 1964, the 18.95-square-kilometre (7.32 sq mi) municipality was the 628th largest by area out of the 689 municipalities in Norway. Hjelme Municipality was the 614th most populous municipality in Norway with a population of about 614. The municipality's population density was 52.2 inhabitants per square kilometre (135/sq mi) and its population had decreased by 4.6% over the previous 10-year period.

== General information ==
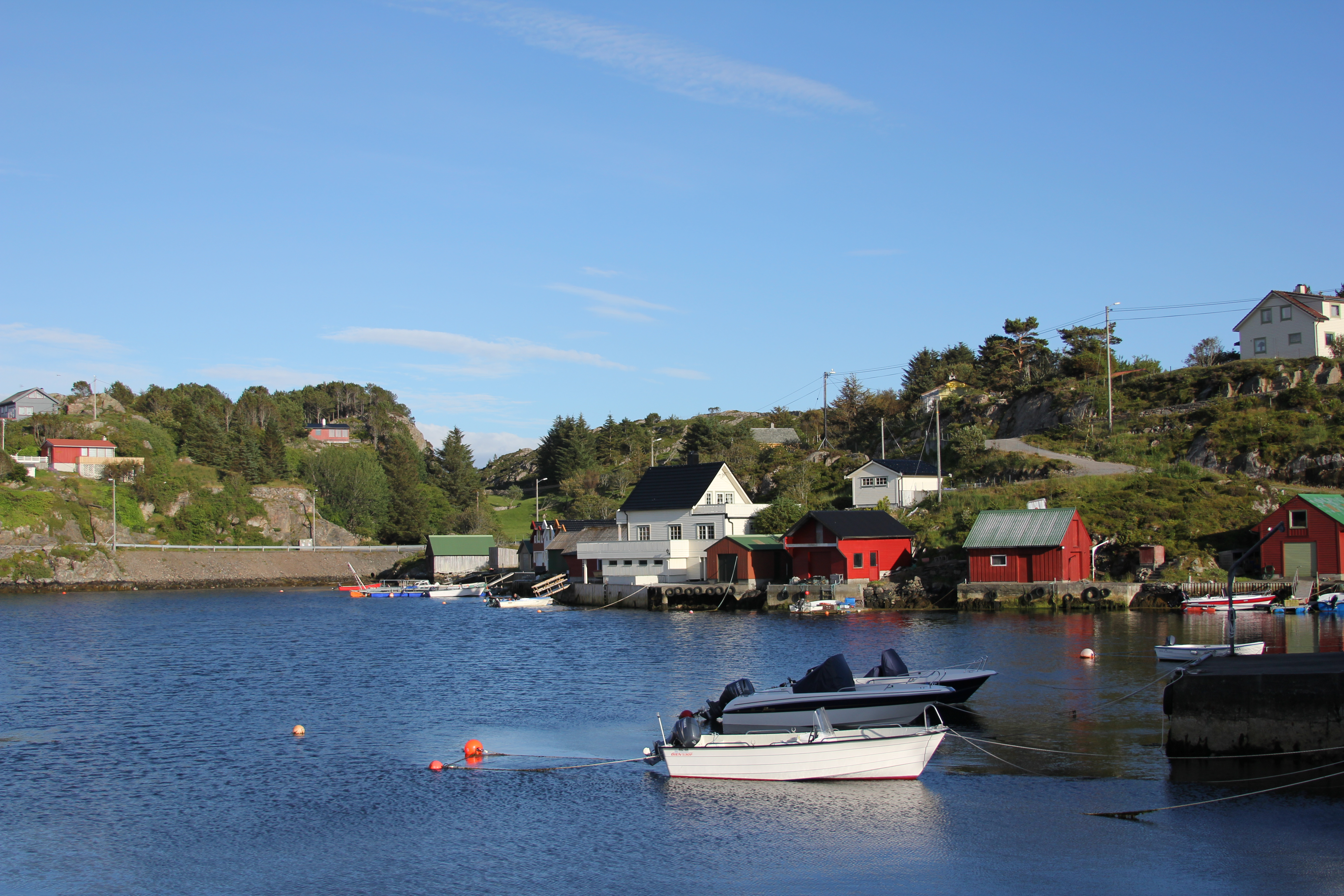
View of the Hellesundet area

On 1 January 1910, Manger Municipality was divided: the western island district (population: 986) became the new Hjelmen Municipality and the rest of the municipality (population: 4,453) remained as a smaller Manger Municipality. On 5 November 1912, the spelling of new municipality was changed from Hjelmen to Hjelme by royal resolution.

During the 1960s, there were many municipal mergers across Norway due to the work of the Schei Committee. On 1 January 1964, Hjelme Municipality (population: 956) was dissolved and it was merged with the majority of the neighboring Herdla Municipality (population: 2,131) to form the new Øygarden Municipality.

=== Name ===
The municipality is named after the old Hjelme farm (Old Norse: Hjalma). The name was likely the old name for the island of Hjelme. The name is the plural form of hjalmr which means "helmet", likely referring to a helmet-shaped mountain on the island near the farm. Historically, the name of the municipality was spelled Hjelmen. On 5 November 1912, a royal resolution changed the spelling of the name of the municipality to Hjelme.

=== Churches ===
The Church of Norway had one parish (sokn) within Hjelme Municipality. At the time of the municipal dissolution, it was part of the Herdla prestegjeld and the Midhordland prosti (deanery) in the Diocese of Bjørgvin.

Churches in Hjelme Municipality
Parish (sokn)	Church name	Location of the church	Year built
Hjelme	Hjelme Church	Hjelmo on Seløyna	1875

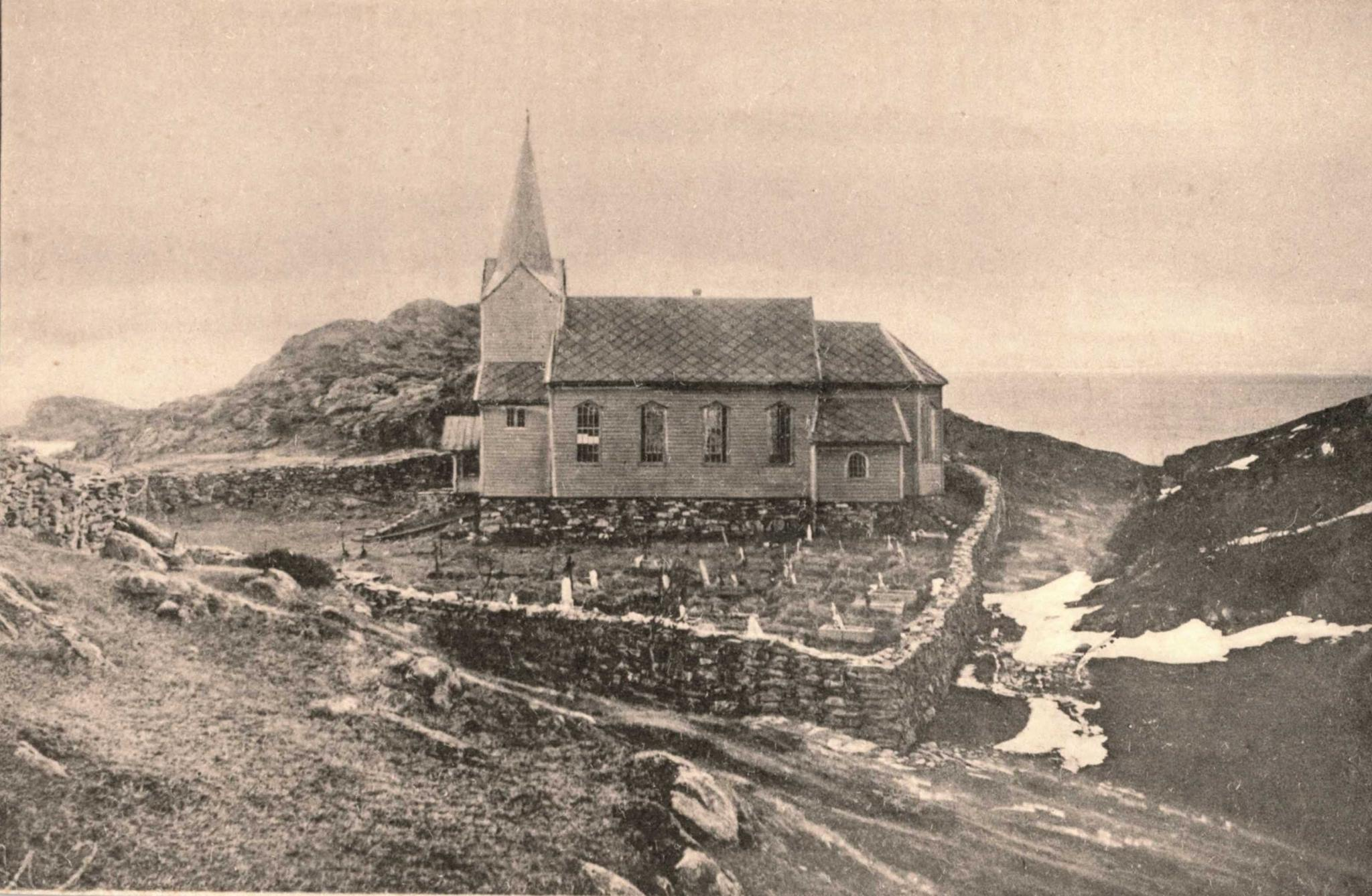
The Old Hjelme Church in 1875

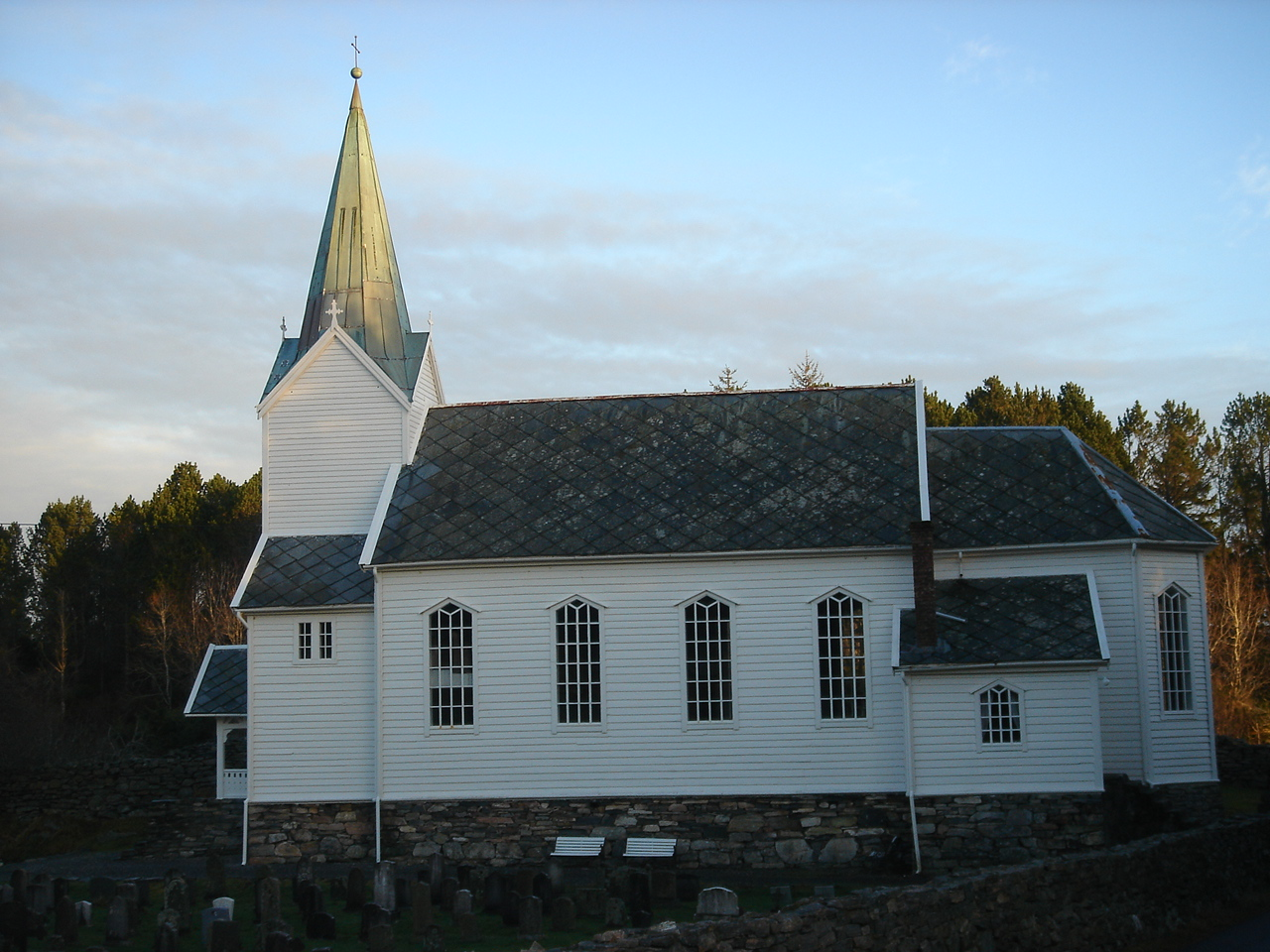
The Old Hjelme Church in the present day

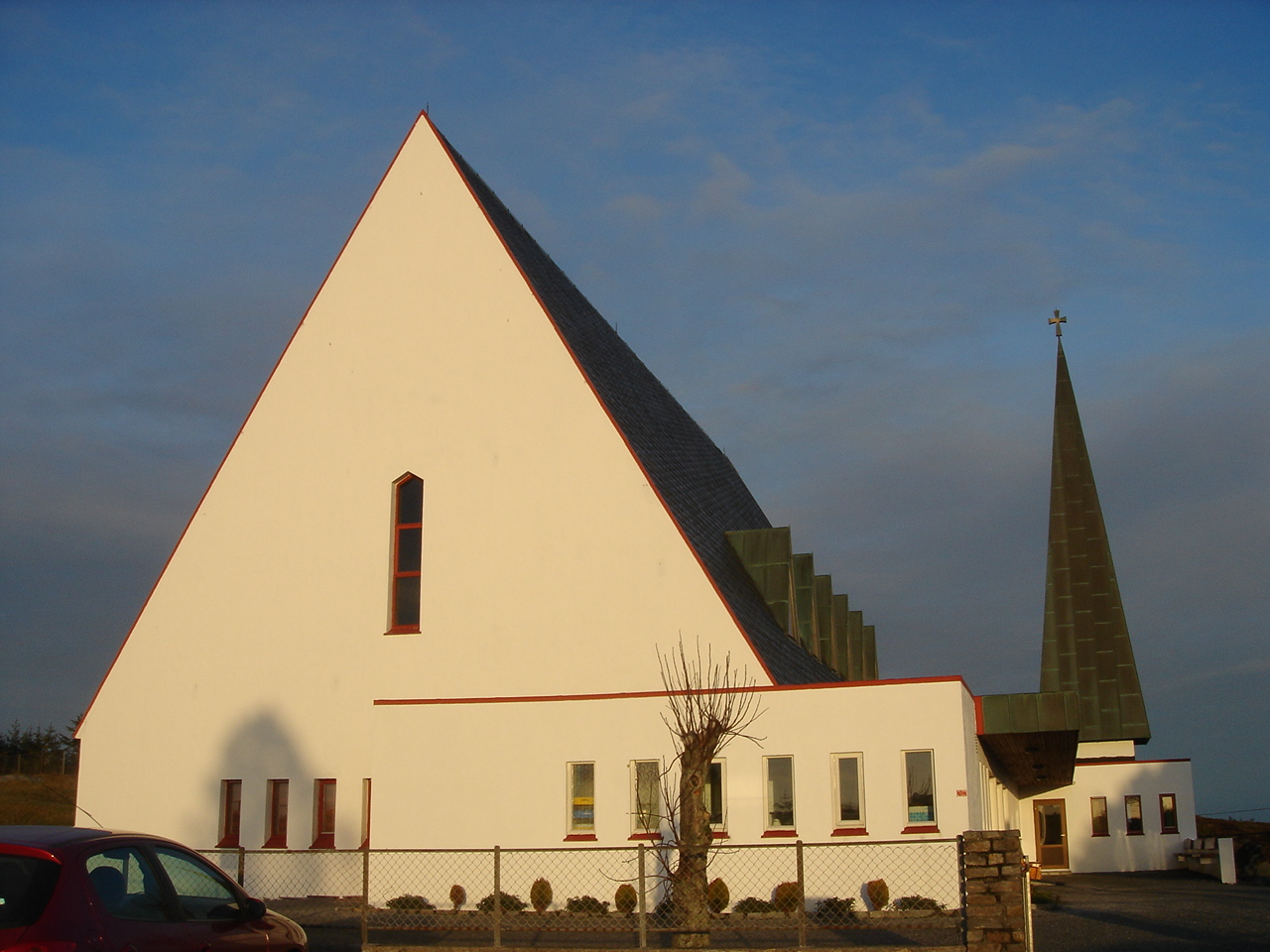
The "new" Hjelme Church (built in 1971; after Hjelme Municipality was dissolved)

== Geography ==
The municipality included the main islands of Alvøyna, Seløyna, Lyngøyna, and Hernar as well as many smaller surrounding islands. The Fedjeosen strait was the northern boundary, the Hjeltefjorden was the eastern boundary, the small Nordra Straumøysundet strait was the southern boundary, and the North Sea was to the west. The highest point in the municipality was the 54.5-metre (179 ft) tall mountain Selsstakken on the island of Seløyna.

== Government ==
While it existed, Hjelme Municipality was responsible for primary education (through 10th grade), outpatient health services, senior citizen services, welfare and other social services, zoning, economic development, and municipal roads and utilities. The municipality was governed by a municipal council of directly elected representatives. The mayor was indirectly elected by a vote of the municipal council. The municipality was under the jurisdiction of the Gulating Court of Appeal.

=== Municipal council ===
The municipal council (Herredsstyre) of Hjelme Municipality was made up of 13 representatives that were elected to four year terms. The tables below show the historical composition of the council by political party.

Hjelme herredsstyre 1959–1963
Party name (in Norwegian)	Number of representatives
Local List(s) (Lokale lister)	13
Total number of members:	13
Note: On 1 January 1964, Hjelme Municipality became part of Øygarden Municipality.

Hjelme herredsstyre 1955–1959
Party name (in Norwegian)	Number of representatives
Labour Party (Arbeiderpartiet)	2
Local List(s) (Lokale lister)	11
Total number of members:	13

Hjelme herredsstyre 1951–1955
Party name (in Norwegian)	Number of representatives
Labour Party (Arbeiderpartiet)	2
Local List(s) (Lokale lister)	10
Total number of members:	12

Hjelme herredsstyre 1947–1951
Party name (in Norwegian)	Number of representatives
Labour Party (Arbeiderpartiet)	2
List of workers, fishermen, and small farmholders (Arbeidere, fiskere, småbrukere liste)	7
Local List(s) (Lokale lister)	3
Total number of members:	12

Hjelme herredsstyre 1945–1947
Party name (in Norwegian)	Number of representatives
Labour Party (Arbeiderpartiet)	5
Joint List(s) of Non-Socialist Parties (Borgerlige Felleslister)	6
Local List(s) (Lokale lister)	1
Total number of members:	12

Hjelme herredsstyre 1937–1941*
Party name (in Norwegian)	Number of representatives
Labour Party (Arbeiderpartiet)	4
List of workers, fishermen, and small farmholders (Arbeidere, fiskere, småbrukere liste)	1
Local List(s) (Lokale lister)	7
Total number of members:	12
Note: Due to the German occupation of Norway during World War II, no elections were held for new municipal councils until after the war ended in 1945.

=== Mayors ===
The mayor (Norwegian: ordfører) of Hjelme Municipality was the political leader of the municipality and the chairperson of the municipal council. The following people held this position:

- 1910–1916: O. Sture
- 1917–1928: Mons L. Skjold
- 1929–1931: Ivar O. Sture
- 1932–1947: Theodor O. Hellesøy
- 1948–1951: Halvor Halvorsen Sæle
- 1952–1955: Johannes M. Skjold (V)
- 1956–1963: Halvor Halvorsen Sæle

== See also ==
- List of former municipalities of Norway
