= Fedjebjørnen =

Mountain in Vestland county, Norway

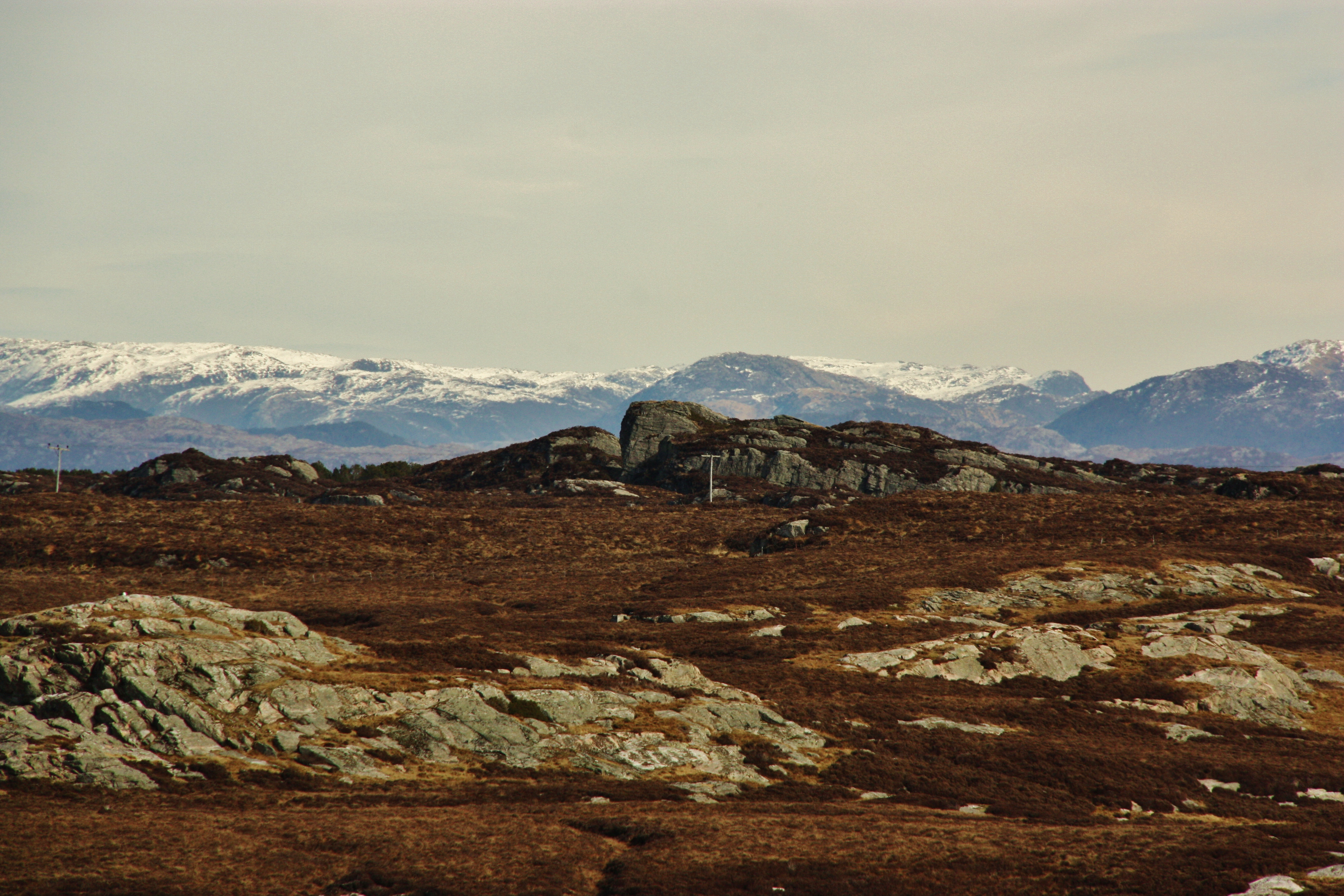

Highest point
- Elevation: 42 m (138 ft)
- Prominence: 42 m (138 ft)
- Coordinates: 60°45′48″N 4°44′05″E

Geography
- Location: Vestland, Norway
- Topo map: 1116 III Herdla

Fedjebjørnen is the highest point on the island of Fedje which is located in Fedje Municipality in Vestland county, Norway. The hill is located on the southeastern part of the island, about halfway between the two villages on the island: Fedje and Stormark. Fedjebjørnen reaches a height of about 42 metres (138 ft) above sea level.

== See also ==
- List of mountains of Norway
