= Kræmmerholmen =

Old trading post in Fedje, Norway

Coordinates: 60.783333°N 4.71083°E

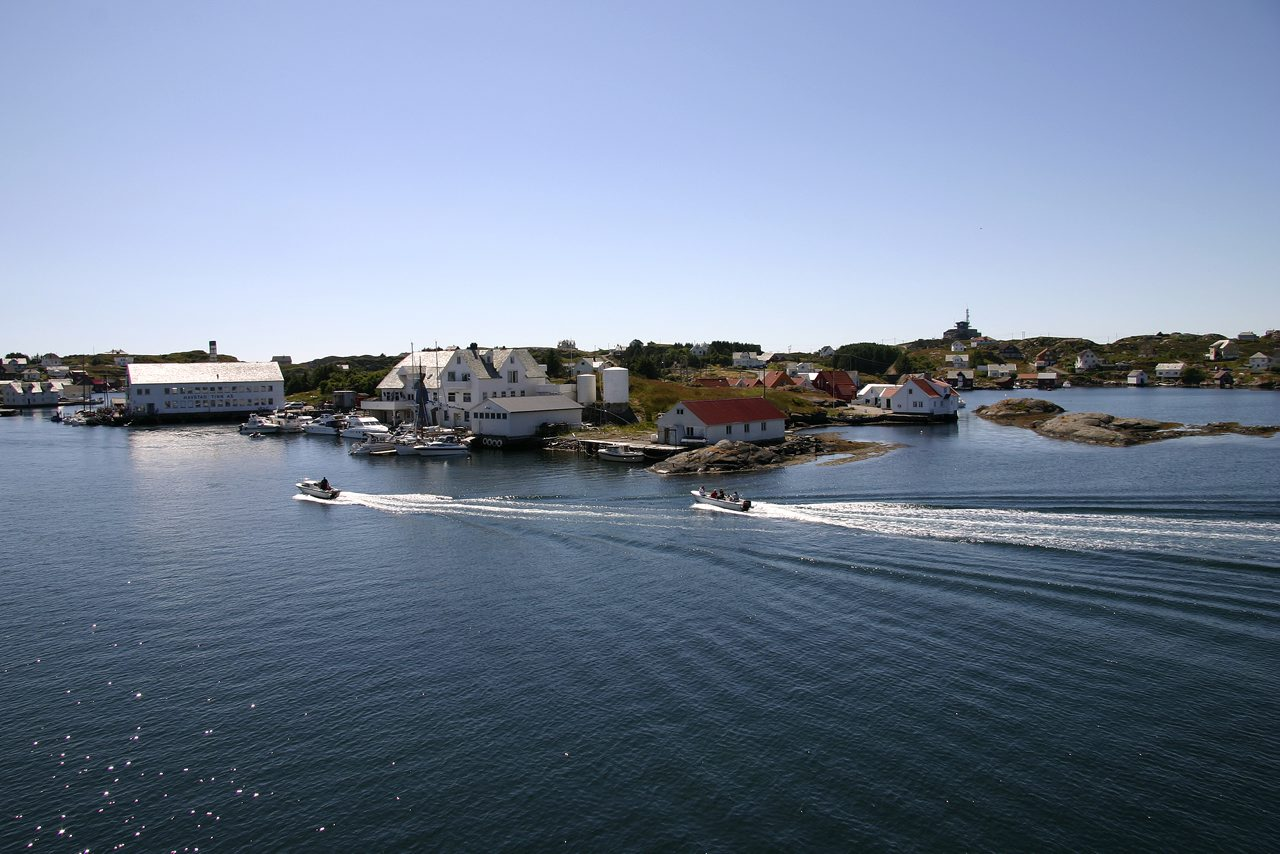
Kræmmerholmen

Kræmmerholmen is an old trading post on the island of Fedje. The trading post is now part of the village of Fedje which is the main village on the island of Fedje in Fedje Municipality, Vestland county, Norway. The main building of Kræmmerholmen was moved to this location in about 1652. During the 18th century, Fedje was an important trading place, with the small island Kræmmerholmen being the location where the trading took place. In 1702, merchants who were citizens of the city of Bergen were granted permission to set up a trader's inshore channel. Trade was managed by a merchant's ablest foreman. Christopher Kahrs, one of the richest merchants in Bergen, purchased Kræmmerholmen in 1799. In addition to the actual trading post, he also owned all of the island of Fedje, including tenant farms and all the dwelling houses.

Kræmmerholmen was reopened in 1991 as a tourist attraction with an inn offering overnight accommodation. The facility closed in September 2008.

Today, Kræmmerholmen consists of the old building which used to house a restaurant and the old boathouse (Naustet) which used to be the local pub.

== Media gallery ==
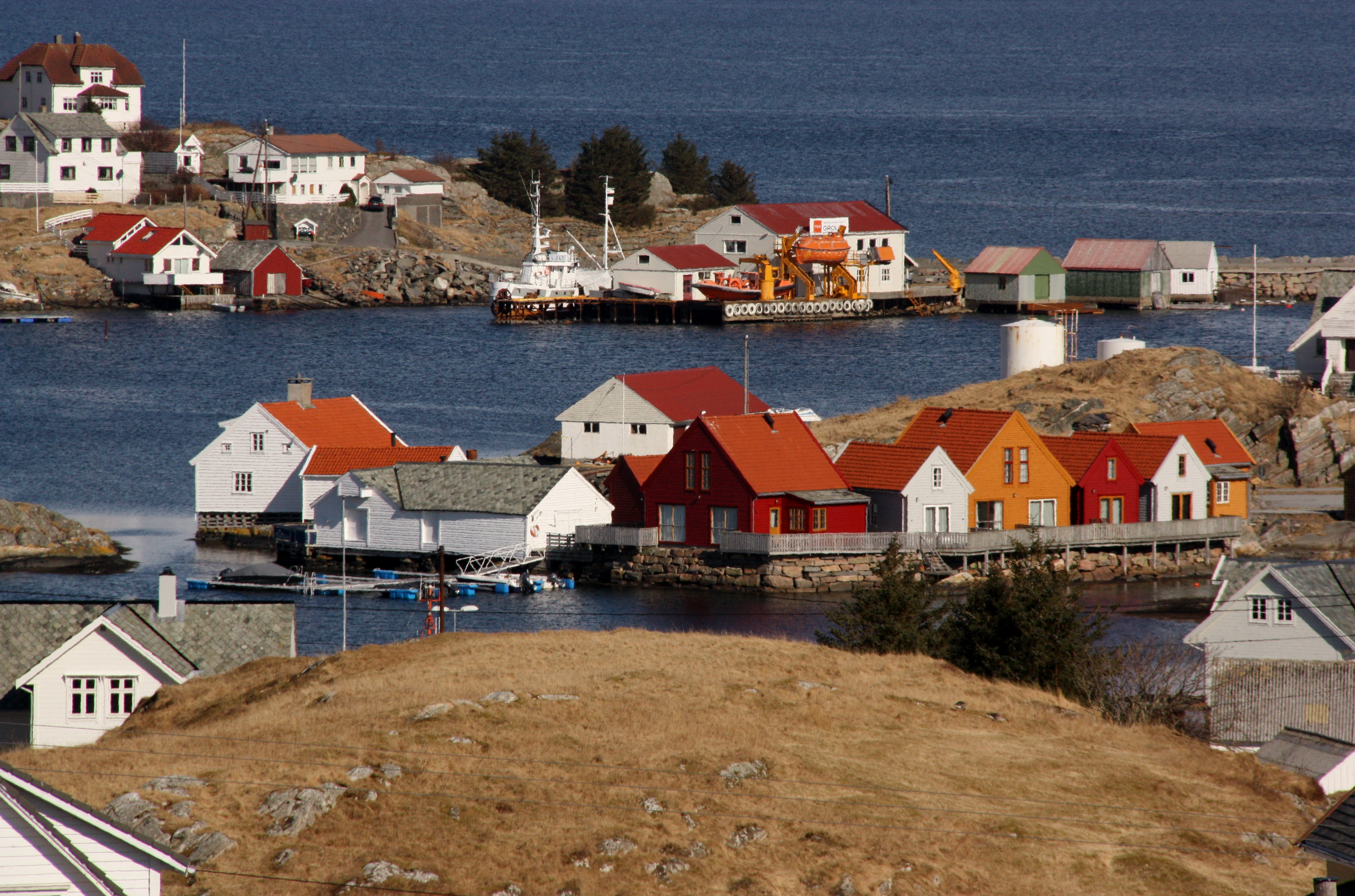
View of Kræmerholmen

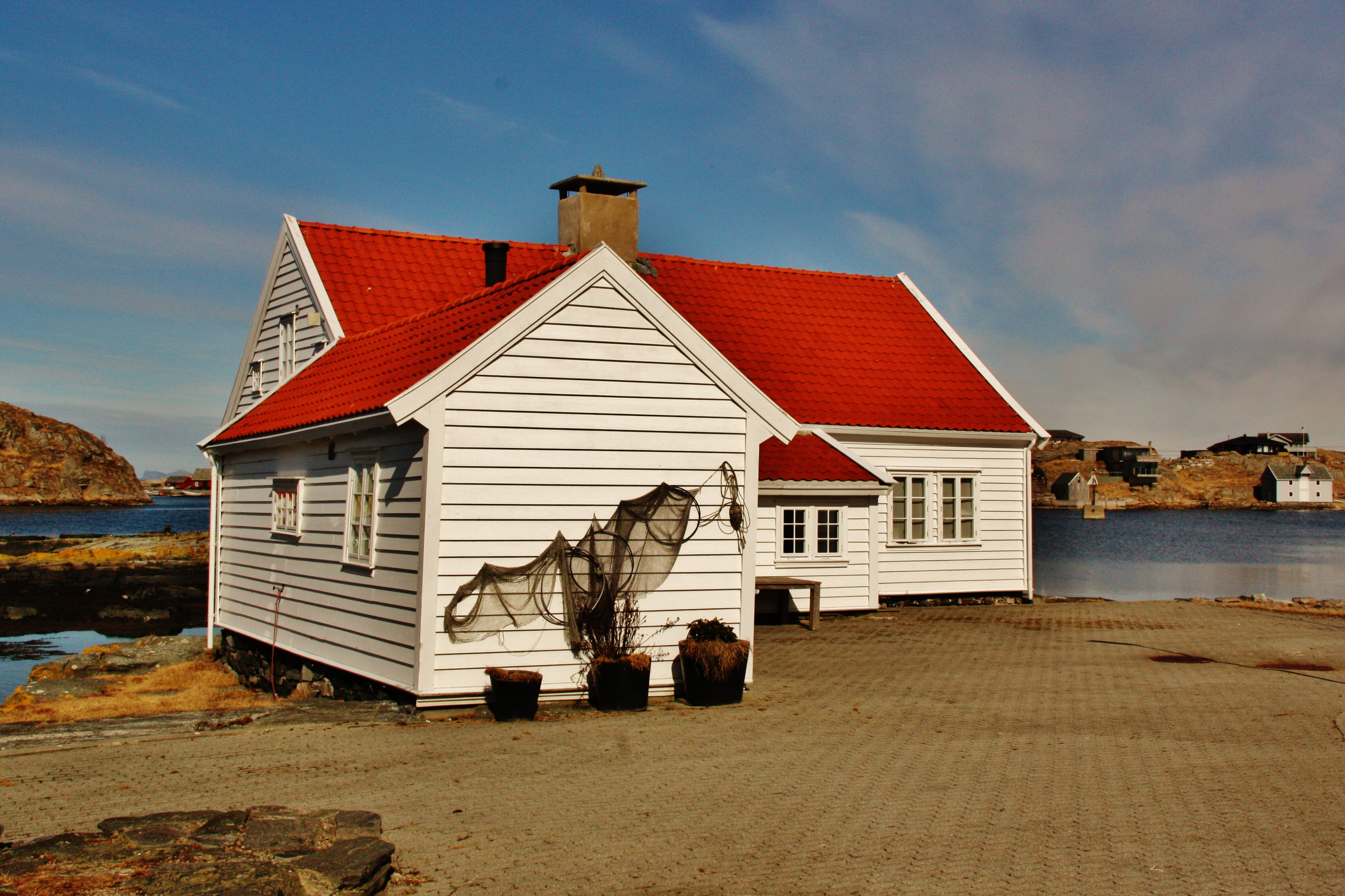
Restaurant
