= Fedjefjorden =

Fjord in Nordhordland, Norway

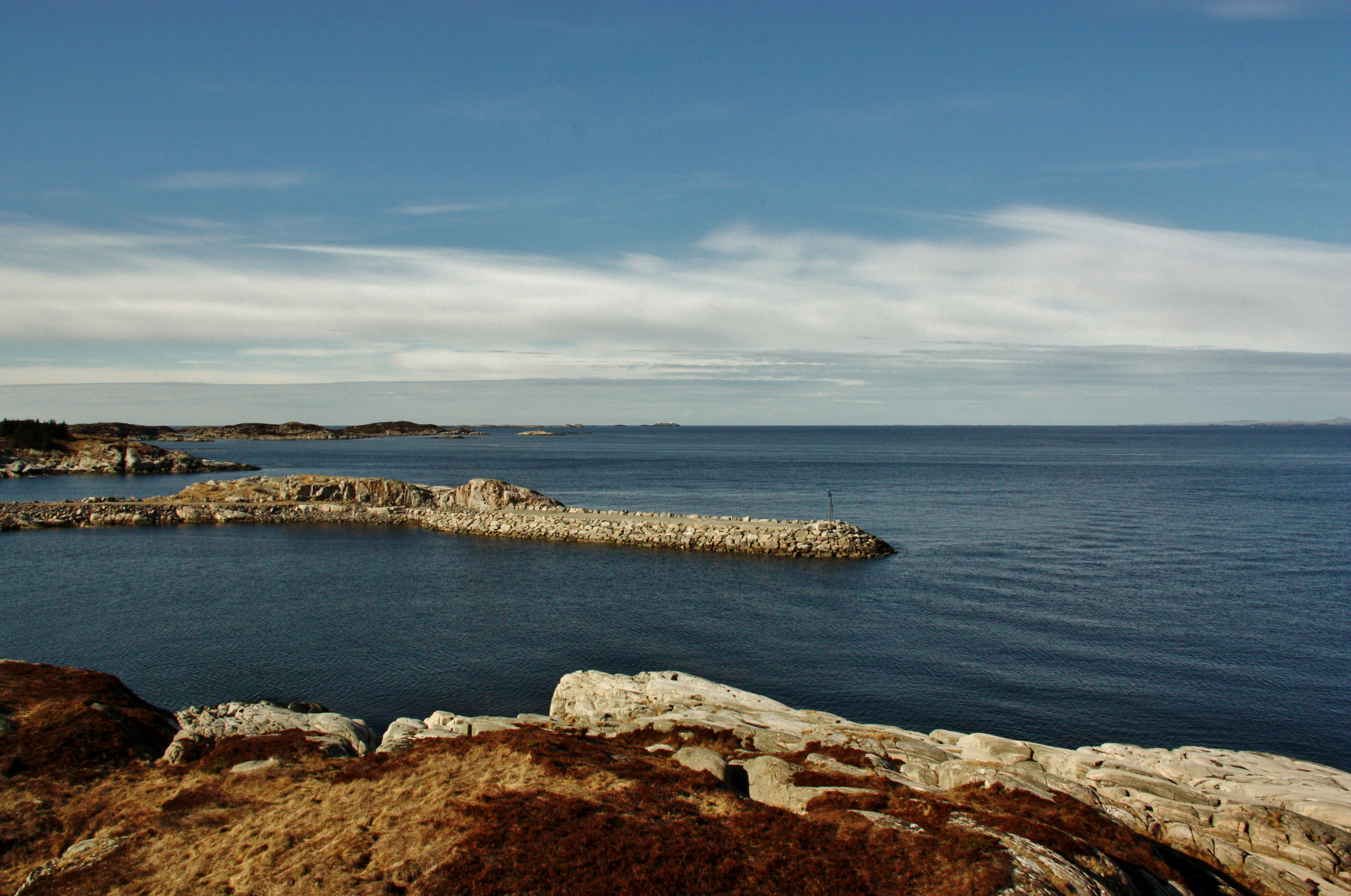
- View of the fjord
- Interactive map of Fedjefjorden
- Location: Vestland county, Norway
- Coordinates: 60.80472°N 4.75246°E
- Type: Fjord
- Basin countries: Norway
- Max. length: 20 kilometres (12 mi)
- Max. width: 5 kilometres (3.1 mi)
- Islands: Fedje

Fedjefjorden is a fjord in Vestland county, Norway. It is located in the municipalities of Fedje, Austrheim, Alver, and Øygarden. The fjord has a width of about 5 kilometres (3.1 mi) and extends about 20 kilometres (12 mi) from Holmengrå Lighthouse (at the northern end) to the island of Seløyna (at the southern end) where it joins the Hjeltefjorden which flows further south towards the city of Bergen.

The fjord flows between several large islands and many small islets. The island of Fedje lies on the west side of the fjord and the islands of Fosnøyna and Radøy lie along the eastern side of the fjord. Just south of the island of Fedje, the fjord opens up westwards to the ocean through the 3.5-kilometre (2.2 mi) wide Fedjeosen.

== See also ==
- List of Norwegian fjords
