= Fedjeosen =

Strait in Vestland, Norway

- Interactive map of Fedjeosen
- Location: Vestland county, Norway
- Coordinates: 60.73588°N 4.76193°E
- Type: Strait
- Basin countries: Norway
- Max. width: 3.5 kilometres (2.2 mi)

Fedjeosen is a strait or stretch of open sea in Vestland county, Norway. It is located between the island of Fedje in Fedje Municipality and the island of Nordøyane in Øygarden Municipality. The strait has a width of about 3.5-kilometre (2.2 mi) and leads into the Fedjefjorden. Hellisøy Lighthouse is located at the northern side of Fedjeosen.
