= Hernar =

Island in Vestland, Norway

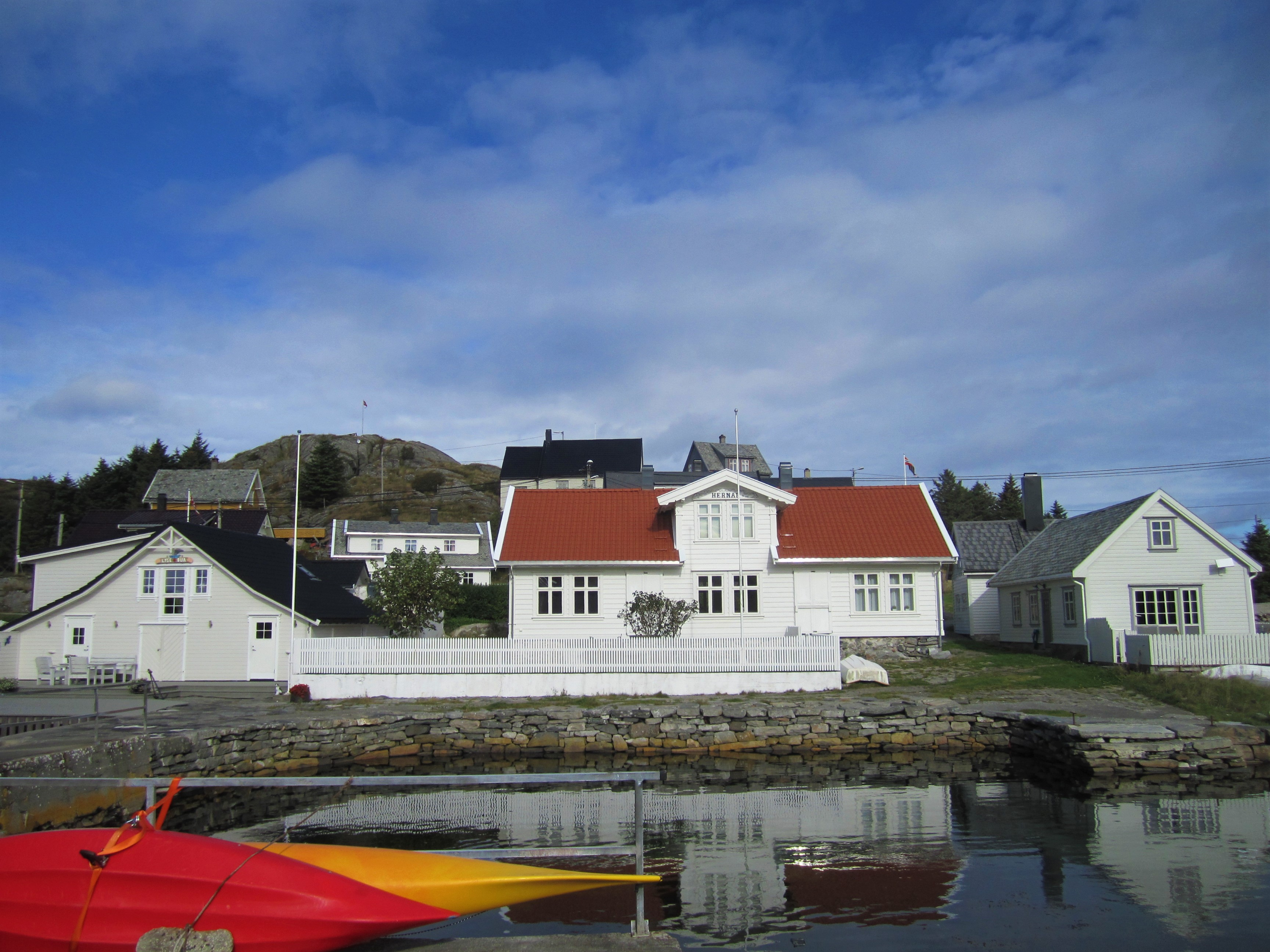
- Hernar old trading post
- Interactive map of Hernar

Geography
- Location: Vestland, Norway
- Coordinates: 60.6881°N 4.7531°E
- Area: 0.5 km^{2} (0.19 sq mi)
- Length: 1.4 km (0.87 mi)
- Width: 430 m (1410 ft)
- Coastline: 4 km (2.5 mi)
- Highest elevation: 34 m (112 ft)

Administration
- Norway
- County: Vestland
- Municipality: Øygarden Municipality

Demographics
- Population: 15 (2001)

Hernar is an island in Øygarden Municipality in Vestland county, Norway. It is one of the northernmost islands in the Øygarden archipelago. The 0.5-square-kilometre (120-acre) island is rocky and barren. Most of the settlement is in one cluster on the southwestern part of the island along the small harbor area. The eastern third of the island is uninhabited.

It sits in a cluster of mostly uninhabited islands, about 3.5 kilometres (2.2 mi) north of the island of Seløyna, the northernmost large, populated island in Øygarden Municipality which is connected to the mainland by a series of bridges. Hernar has about 15 permanent inhabitants and many holiday cabins. It is connected to the mainland via a passenger ferry service to the small island of Hellesøyna, just off the coast of Seløyna. The ferry service is operated by Bergen Nordhordland Rutelag.

== See also ==
- List of islands of Norway
