= Holmengrå Lighthouse =

Coastal lighthouse in Fedje, Norway

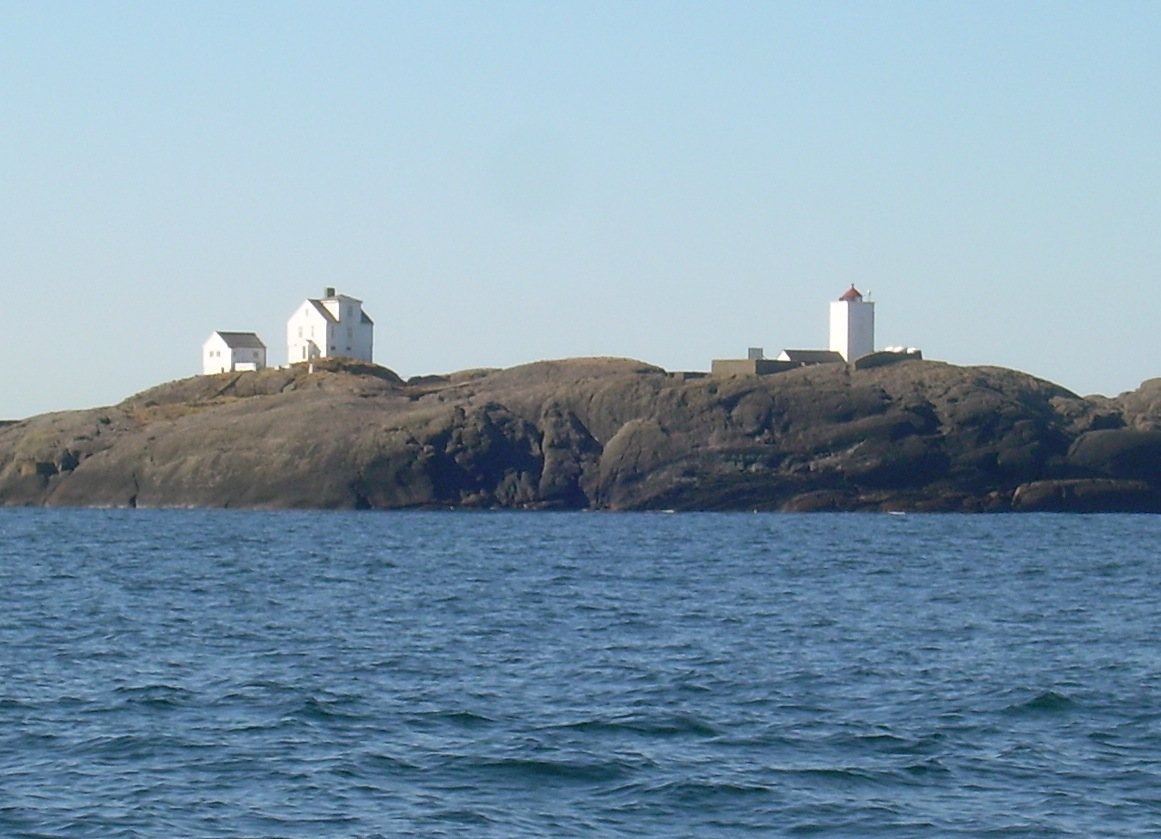
- View of Holmengrå Lighthouse
- Location: Holmengra, Fedje Municipality, Norway
- Coordinates: 60°50′35″N 4°38′58″E

Tower
- Constructed: 1892
- Construction: masonry
- Automated: 1986
- Height: 16 m (52 ft)
- Shape: square
- Markings: White (tower), red (lantern)
- Racon: T

Light
- Focal height: 35.5 m (116 ft)
- Intensity: 44,000 candela
- Range: 13 nmi (24 km; 15 mi) (white), 10 nmi (19 km; 12 mi) (red), 9 nmi (17 km; 10 mi) (green)
- Characteristic: Iso WRG 6s

Holmengrå Lighthouse (Norwegian: Holmengrå fyr) is a coastal lighthouse located in Fedje Municipality in Vestland county, Norway. It sits on a tiny island in the mouth of the Fensfjorden and Fedjefjorden, near a busy shipping lane headed to the Mongstad industrial area.

== History ==
The lighthouse was established in 1892. A radio beacon was active from 1947 to 1992.

The lighthouse emits a white, red, or green light (depending on direction) using a 3 seconds on, 3 seconds off pattern. The light sits at an elevation of 35 metres (115 ft) above sea level. The 10-metre (33 ft) tall square tower is painted white, with a red lighthouse on the top.

== See also ==
- List of lighthouses in Norway
- Lighthouses in Norway
