= Hellisøy Lighthouse =

Coastal lighthouse in Fedje municipality in Vestland county, Norway

Hellisøy Lighthouse Hellisøy fyr
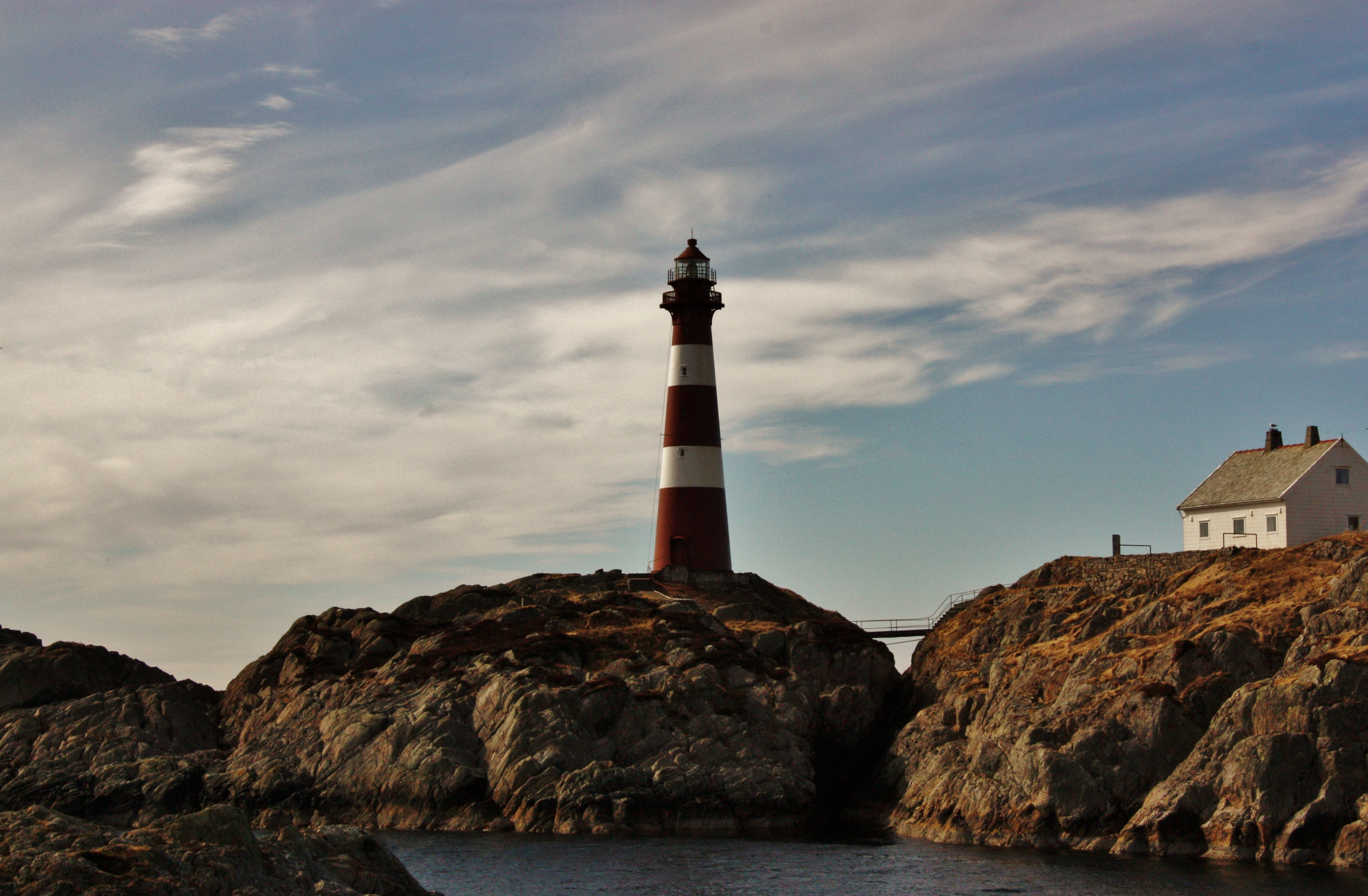
- Location: Hellisøy, Fedje Municipality, Norway
- Coordinates: 60°45′08″N 4°42′39″E

Tower
- Constructed: 1855
- Construction: granite (foundation), cast iron (tower)
- Automated: 1992
- Height: 32.3 m (106 ft)
- Shape: cylinder
- Markings: Red, Stripe (2, white)
- Heritage: cultural property
- Racon: O

Light
- Focal height: 46.5 m (153 ft)
- Lens: third order Fresnel lens
- Intensity: 960,000 candela
- Range: 18.8 nmi (34.8 km; 21.6 mi)
- Characteristic: FFl W 30s

Hellisøy Lighthouse (Norwegian: Hellisøy fyr) is a coastal lighthouse in Fedje Municipality in Vestland county, Norway. The lighthouse lies on the small island of Hellisøy, just off the southwest coast of the larger island of Fedje and along the Fedjeosen strait.

== History ==
This tower was built in 1855, making it Norway's second-oldest cast iron lighthouse. It is essentially a copy of the Eigerøy Lighthouse built a year earlier on the southwest coast. The lighthouse was automated in 1992.

The lighthouse emits a continuous white light with a more intense flash every 30 seconds. The light sits at an elevation of about 46 metres (151 ft) above sea level. The 32-metre (105 ft) tall round cast iron tower is painted red with two narrow white horizontal bands. There is a 3rd order Fresnel lens in the lighthouse that has been in use since 1903. The lens puts out a light with an intensity of 960,000 candela which can be seen for up to 18.8 nautical miles (34.8 km; 21.6 mi).

== See also ==
- List of lighthouses in Norway
- Lighthouses in Norway
