= Old Hjelme Church =

Church in Vestland, Norway

- Hjelme gamle kirke
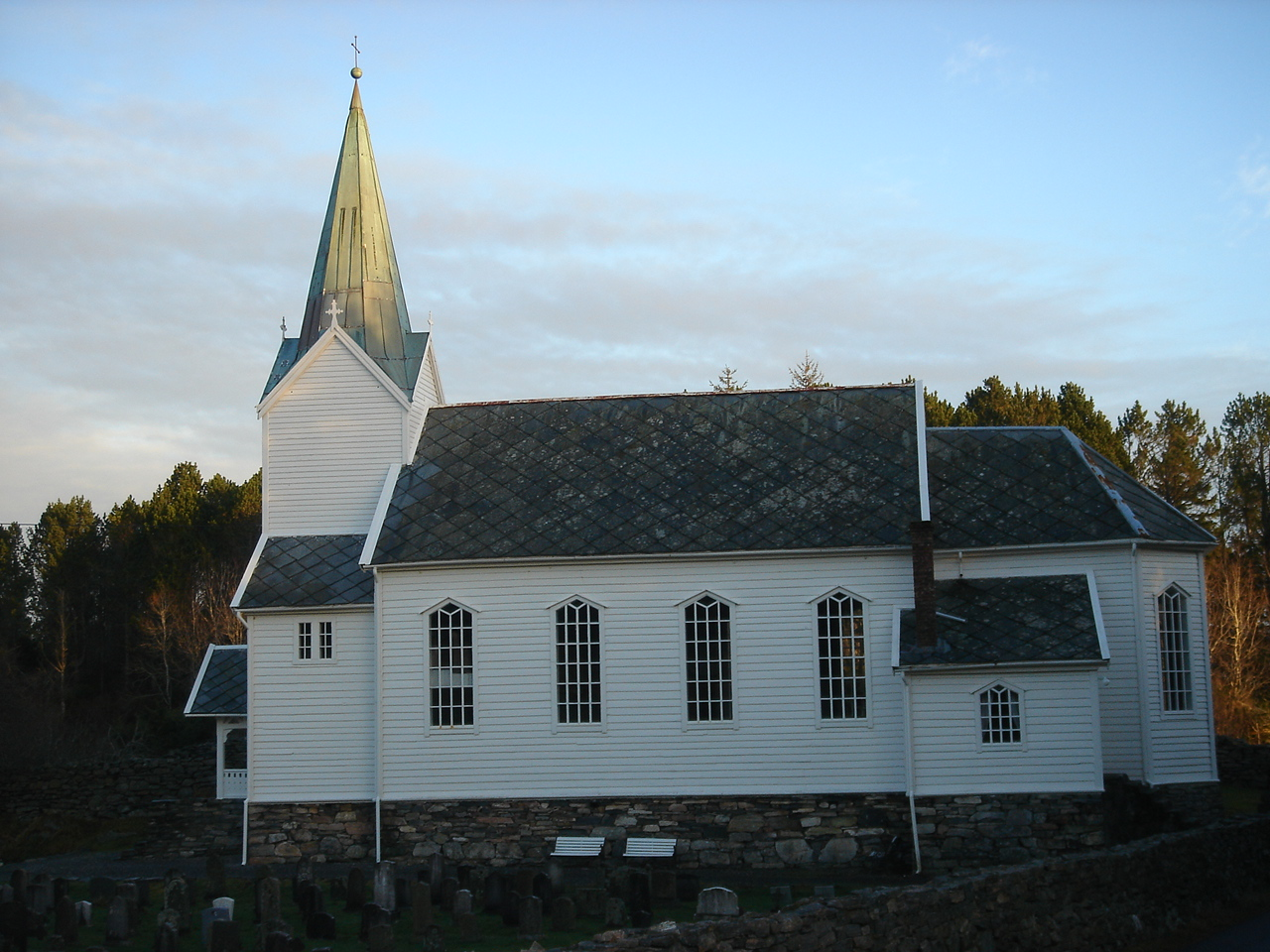
- View of the church
- Old Hjelme Church
- 60°39′03″N 4°49′32″E
- Location: Øygarden Municipality, Vestland
- Country: Norway
- Denomination: Church of Norway
- Churchmanship: Evangelical Lutheran

History
- Former name(s): Ytre Bø kapell Øygarden kapell
- Status: Parish church
- Founded: 1875
- Consecrated: 5 Aug 1875
- Events: 1971 (taken out of regular use)

Architecture
- Functional status: Active
- Architect: Jacob Wilhelm Nordan
- Architectural type: Long church
- Completed: 1875 (151 years ago)

Specifications
- Capacity: 180
- Materials: Wood

Administration
- Diocese: Bjørgvin bispedømme
- Deanery: Vesthordland prosti
- Parish: Hjelme og Blomvåg
- Norwegian Cultural Heritage Site
- Type: Church
- Status: Listed
- ID: 84582-1

Old Hjelme Church (Norwegian: Hjelme gamle kirke) is a parish church of the Church of Norway in Øygarden Municipality in Vestland county, Norway. It is located in the village of Hjelmo on the island of Seløyna. It is one of the three churches in the Hjelme og Blomvåg parish which is part of the Vesthordland prosti (deanery) in the Diocese of Bjørgvin. The white, wooden church was built in a long church design in 1875 using plans drawn up by the architect Jacob Wilhelm Nordan. The church seats about 180 people.

== History ==
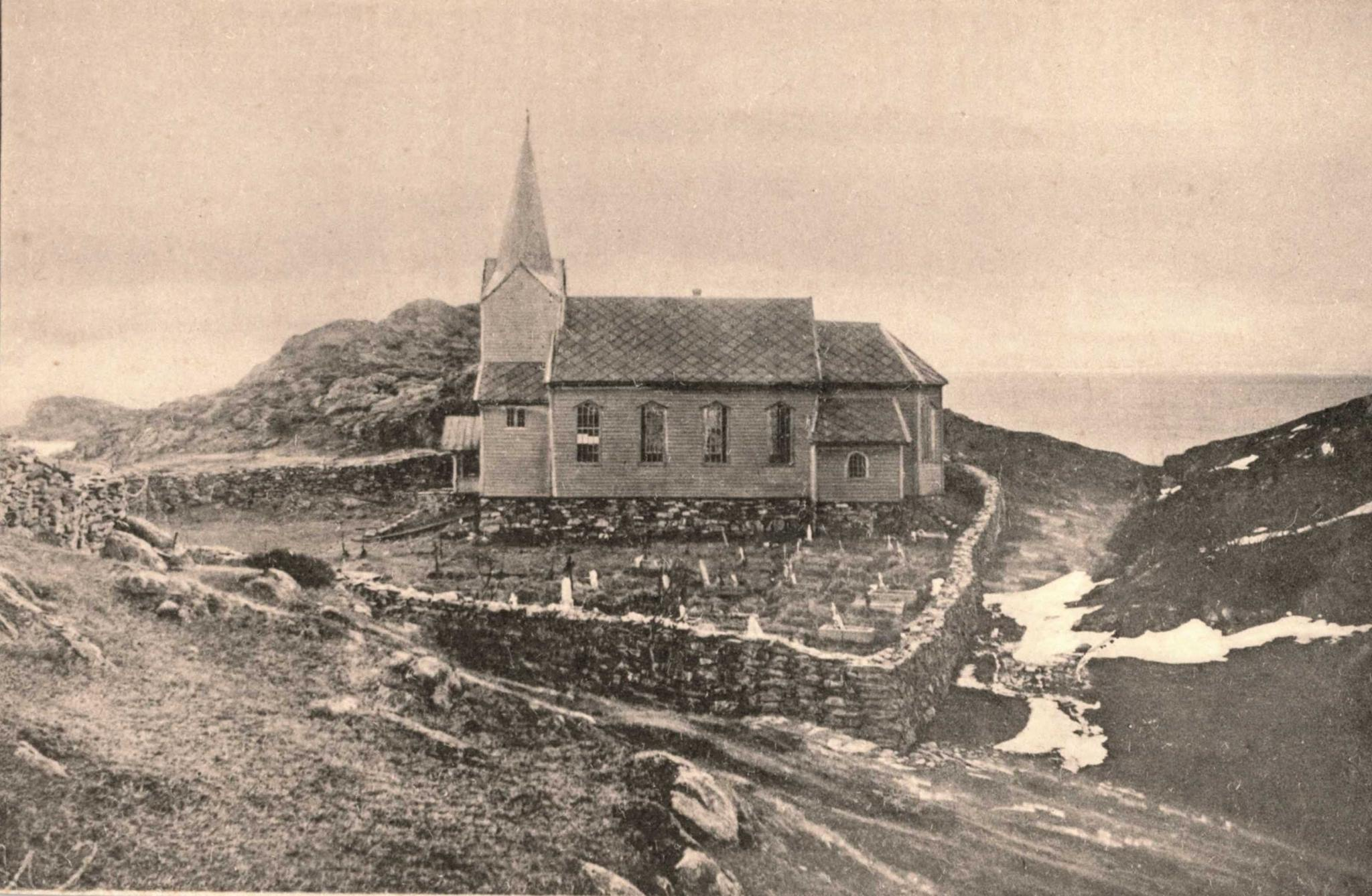
Historic view of the church

The church was built in 1875 to serve the people on the Øygarden archipelago, who previously had to cross the Hjeltefjorden to go to the Manger Church or Hordabø Church. The new church, designed by Jacob Wilhelm Nordan, was originally titled Ytre Bø kapell or Øygarden kapell. The church was consecrated on 5 August 1875. Later, the parish was divided and this chapel was renamed Hjelme Church and it was the main church for the new Hjelme parish. The church was in regular use until 1971 when the new (larger) Hjelme Church was opened about 2.5 kilometres (1.6 mi) away, near the main road. Since that time, the church was renamed "Old Hjelme Church" and it has only been used for special situations such as weddings and funerals. Around 2004, the church was closed due to significant maintenance needs. In 2017, the church was repaired and was available for use once again.

== See also ==
- List of churches in Bjørgvin
