= Fedje (village) =

Village in Fedje Municipality, Norway

- Village
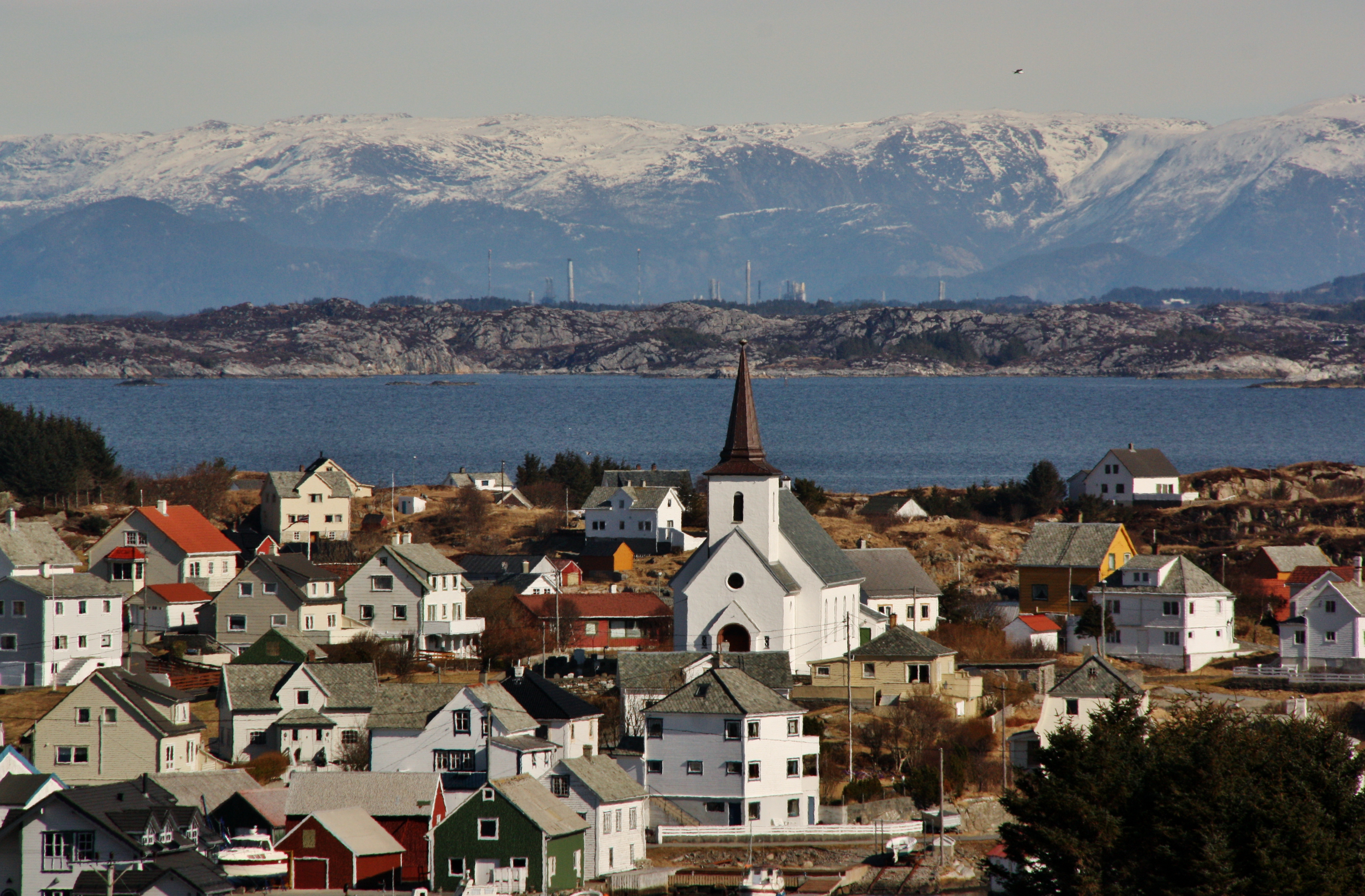
- View of the village
- Interactive map of Fedje
- Location within Vestland Location within Norway
- Coordinates: 60.7789°N 4.71489°E
- Country: Norway
- Region: Western Norway
- County: Vestland
- District: Nordhordland
- Municipality: Fedje Municipality

Area
  - Total: 0.64 km^{2} (0.25 sq mi)
- Elevation: 12 m (39 ft)

Population (2025)
  - Total: 397
  - Density: 620/km^{2} (1,600/sq mi)
- Time zone: UTC+01:00 (CET)
  - Summer (DST): UTC+02:00 (CEST)
- Post Code: 5947 Fedje

Fedje is a fishing village and the administrative centre of Fedje Municipality in Vestland county, Norway. The village is located on the northern shores of the island of Fedje.

The village of Fedje is an old trading center, which grew up around Kræmmerholmen, a small island in the Fedje harbor. Fedje Church is located in the village, serving the people of the whole municipality.

The 0.64-square-kilometre (160-acre) village has a population (2025) of 397 and a population density of 620 inhabitants per square kilometre (1,600/sq mi).
