= Hjelme Church =

Church in Vestland, Norway

- Hjelme kirke
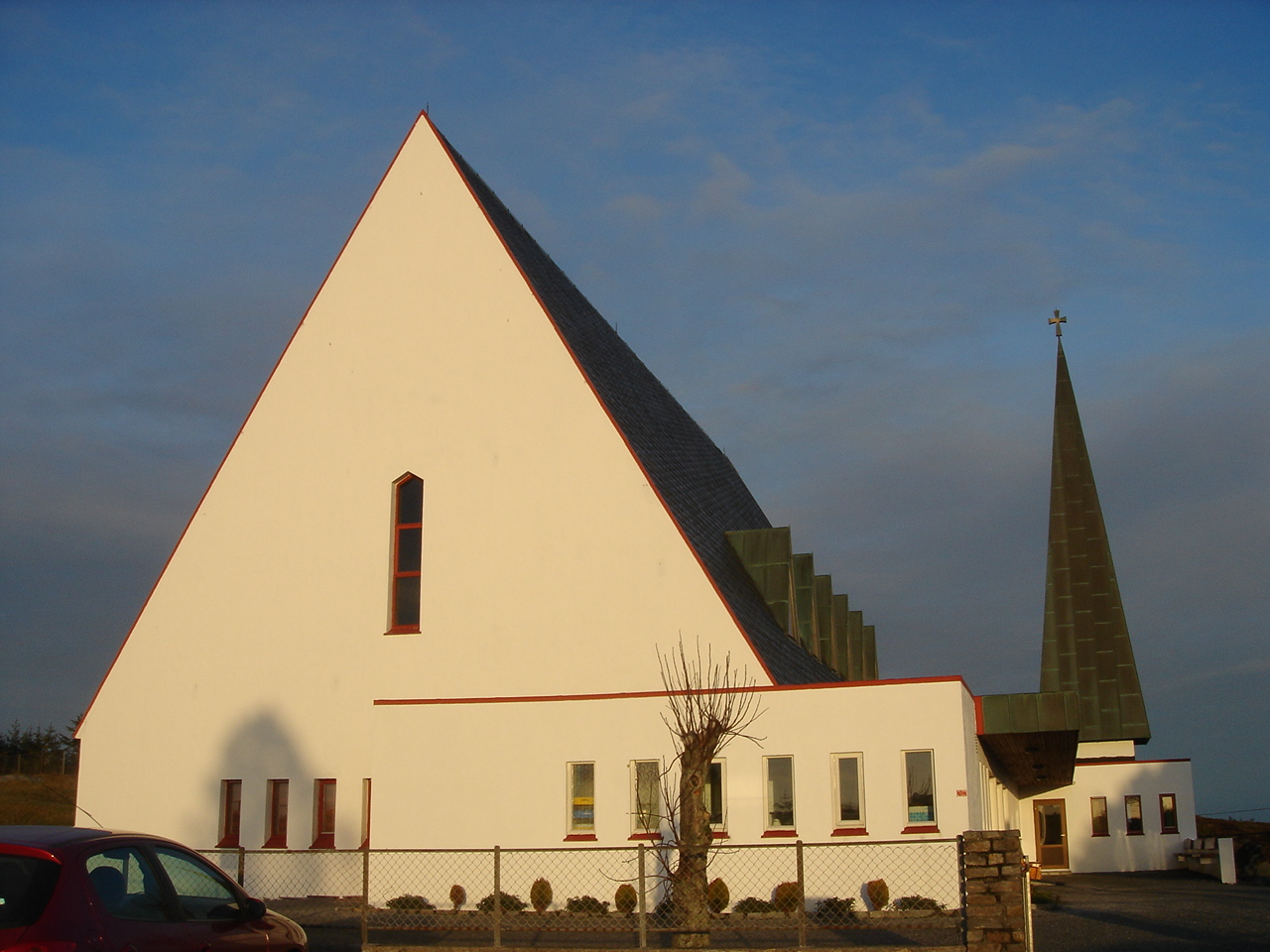
- View of the church
- Hjelme Church
- 60°38′56″N 4°47′53″E
- Location: Øygarden Municipality, Vestland
- Country: Norway
- Denomination: Church of Norway
- Churchmanship: Evangelical Lutheran

History
- Status: Parish church
- Founded: 1971
- Consecrated: 13 June 1971

Architecture
- Functional status: Active
- Architect: Arne S. Halvorsen
- Architectural type: Rectangular
- Completed: 1971 (55 years ago)

Specifications
- Capacity: 340
- Materials: Concrete

Administration
- Diocese: Bjørgvin bispedømme
- Deanery: Vesthordland prosti
- Parish: Hjelme og Blomvåg
- Norwegian Cultural Heritage Site
- Type: Church
- Status: Not protected
- ID: 84582-2

Hjelme Church (Norwegian: Hjelme kirke) is a parish church of the Church of Norway in Øygarden Municipality in Vestland county, Norway. It is located in the central part of the island of Seløyna. It is one of the three churches in the Hjelme og Blomvåg parish which is part of the Vesthordland prosti (deanery) in the Diocese of Bjørgvin. The white, concrete church was built in a rectangular design in 1971 using plans drawn up by the architect Arne S. Halvorsen. The church seats about 340 people.

== History ==
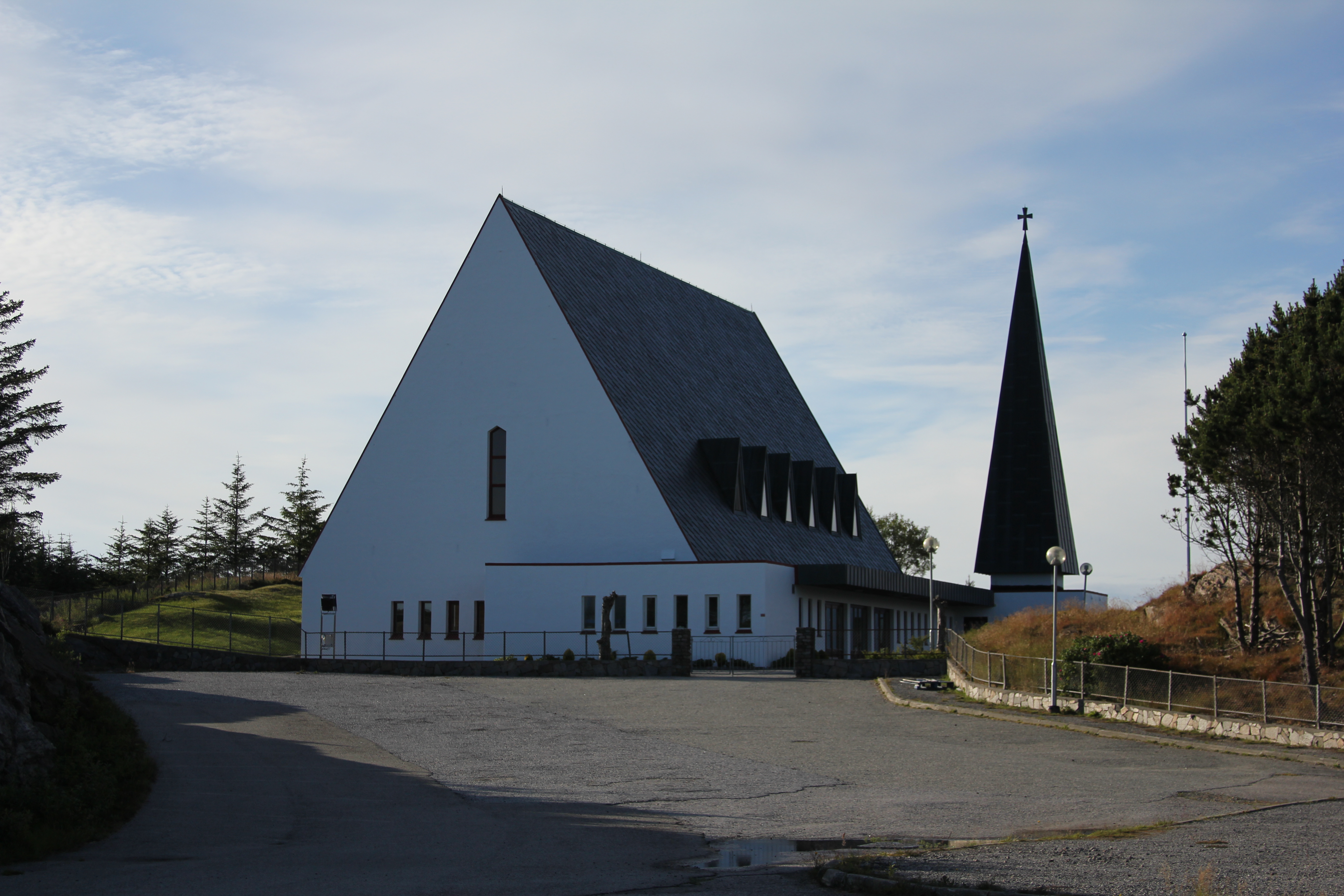
View of the church

The Old Hjelme Church, which is now used only for special situations such as weddings and funerals, was built in 1875 to serve the northern part of what is now Øygarden Municipality. That church stood at Hjelmo, about 2.5 kilometres (1.6 mi) from the present church site. In the late 1960s, the parish wanted a newer, larger church. It was decided to build a new church on the main road, closer to the main population center on Hellesøyna. Arne Halvorsen was hired to design the new church. The church was built in 1970-1971. It was consecrated on 13 June 1971 by the Bishop Per Juvkam.

== See also ==
- List of churches in Bjørgvin
