= Fedje Municipality =

Municipality in Vestland, Norway

Fedje Municipality Fedje kommune
- Municipality
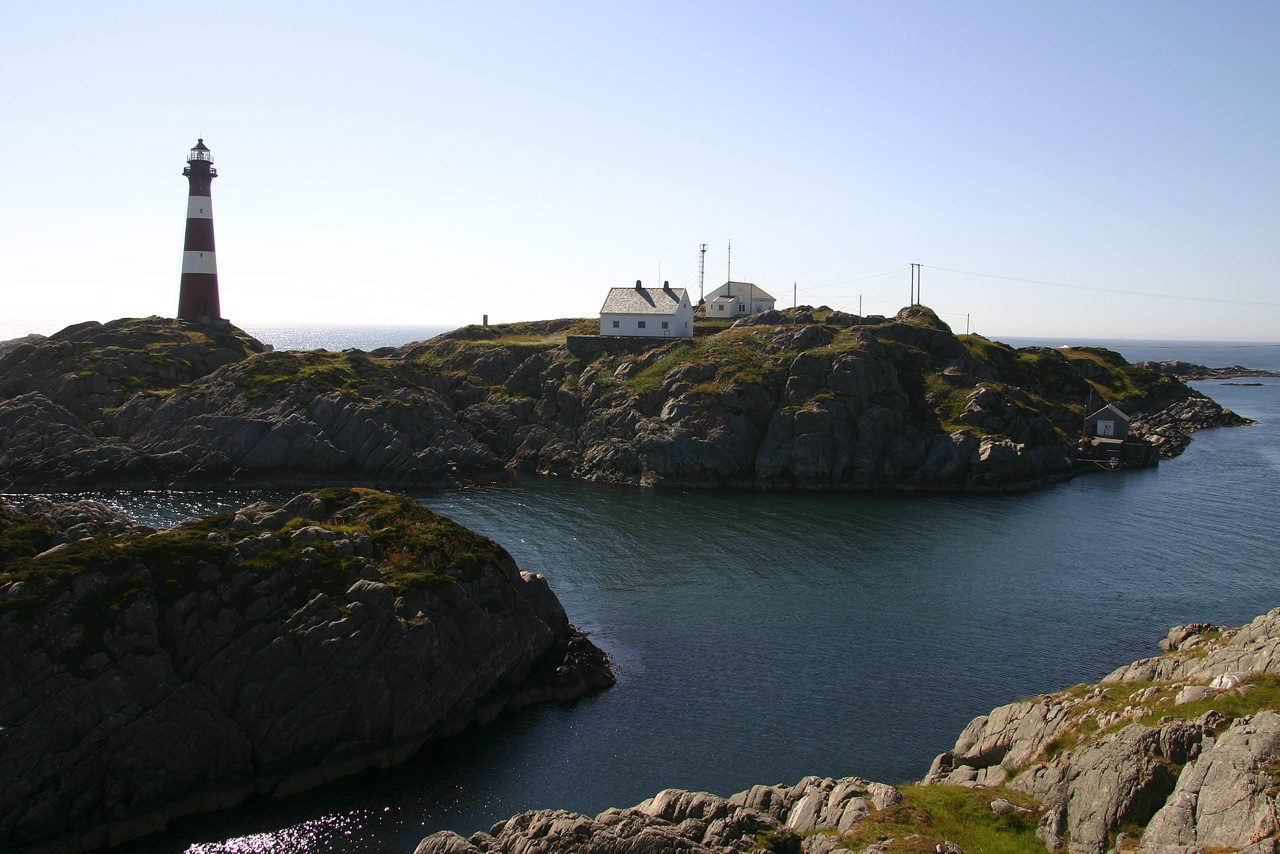
- View of the Hellisøy Lighthouse

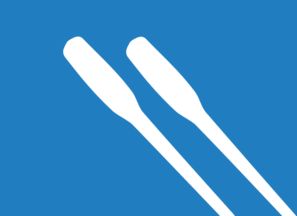
- Flag Coat of arms

- Vestland within Norway

- Fedje within Vestland
- Coordinates: 60°46′08″N 04°43′50″E
- Country: Norway
- County: Vestland
- District: Nordhordland
- Established: 1 Jan 1947
  - Preceded by: Austrheim Municipality
- Administrative centre: Fedje

Government
  - Mayor (2015): Stian Herøy (H)

Area
  - Total: 9.27 km^{2} (3.58 sq mi)
  - Land: 8.95 km^{2} (3.46 sq mi)
  - Water: 0.32 km^{2} (0.12 sq mi) 3.5%
  - Rank: #355 in Norway
- Highest elevation: 42.16 m (138.3 ft)

Population (2025)
  - Total: 521
  - Rank: #351 in Norway
  - Density: 56.2/km^{2} (146/sq mi)
  - Change (10 years): ▼ −7.5%
- Demonym: Fedjing

Official language
  - Norwegian form: Nynorsk
- Time zone: UTC+01:00 (CET)
  - Summer (DST): UTC+02:00 (CEST)
- ISO 3166 code: NO-4633
- Website: Official website

Fedje is an island municipality in the Nordhordland region of Vestland county, Norway. The municipality is located in the traditional district of Nordhordland. The administrative centre of the municipality is the village of Fedje. The main economic activity of the inhabitants for a long time has been fishing. The municipality consists of the main island of Fedje which is also surrounded by about 125 smaller islands and rocks mostly north of the main island. The name Fedje applies both to the main island, the main village, and to all the islands and rocks as a whole municipality.

The 9.27-square-kilometre (3.58 sq mi) municipality is the 355th largest by area out of the 357 municipalities in Norway. Fedje Municipality is the 351st most populous municipality in Norway with a population of 521. The municipality's population density is 56.2 inhabitants per square kilometre (146/sq mi) and its population has decreased by 7.5% over the previous 10-year period.

== General information ==
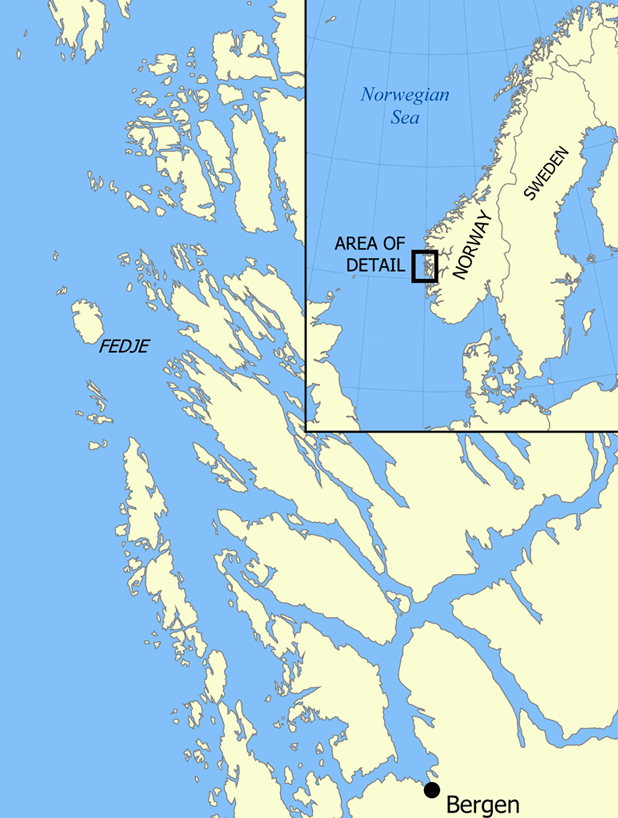
Map of Fedje

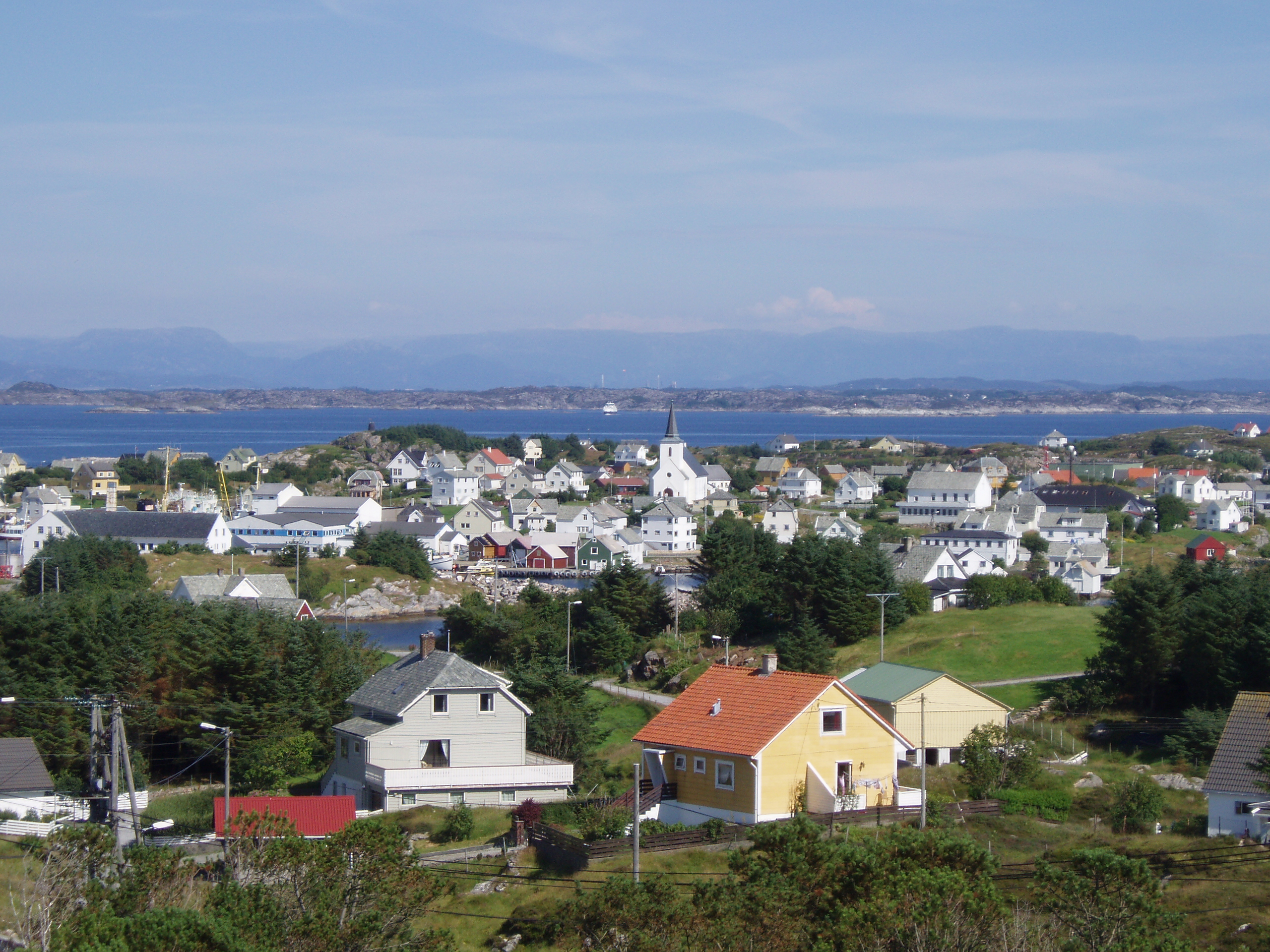
Village of Fedje

Historically, the islands of Fedje belonged to the prestegjeld of Lindås. In 1910, the northwestern part of Lindås Municipality was separated to become the new Austrheim Municipality (which at that time also included Fedje). On 1 January 1947, all of Austrheim Municipality located west of the Fedjefjorden (population: 920) was separated to become the new Fedje Municipality. The borders have not changed since the establishment of the municipality.

Historically, this municipality was part of the old Hordaland county. On 1 January 2020, the municipality became a part of the newly-formed Vestland county (after Hordaland and Sogn og Fjordane counties were merged).

=== Name ===
The municipality (originally the parish) is named after the old Fedje farm (Old Norse: Feðjar) since the first Fedje Church was built there. The name comes from the word faþa (Gothic: 𐍆𐌰𐌸𐌰) which means "fence" or "wall". The meaning here refers to a row of islands or archipelago, separating the inshore waters (now called the Fedjefjorden) from the ocean.

=== Coat of arms ===
The coat of arms was granted on 13 July 1990. The official blazon is "Azure, two oars argent in bend issuant from the base sinister" (Norwegian: På blå grunn to skrått framveksande sølv årar). This means the arms have a blue field (background) and the charge is a pair of oars aligned diagonally one above the other. The charge has a tincture of argent which means it is commonly colored white, but if it is made out of metal, then silver is used. This symbolizes the rich boating history of this island municipality. The arms were designed by Even Jarl Skoglund. The municipal flag has the same design as the coat of arms.

=== Churches ===
The Church of Norway has one parish (sokn) within Fedje Municipality. It is part of the Nordhordland prosti (deanery) in the Diocese of Bjørgvin.

Churches in Fedje Municipality
Parish (sokn)	Church name	Location of the church	Year built
Fedje	Fedje Church	Fedje	1941

=== Education ===
Fedje has an elementary school, and a junior high school, both of which are situated in the center of the island, and in the same building. The school is also used as a movie theater twice a week.

== History ==
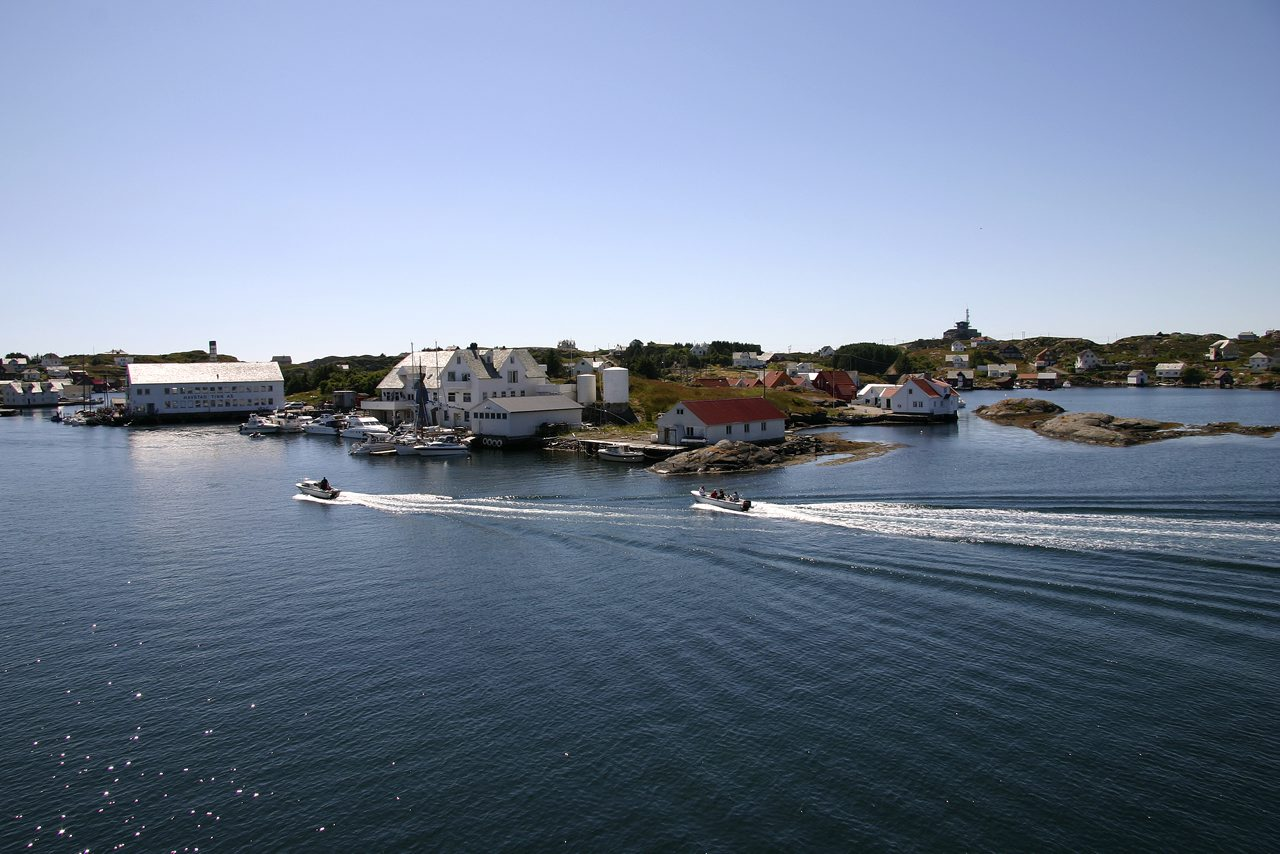
Kræmmerholmen.

There are traces of human activity on Fedje from as long as 4,000 years ago. In the 18th century, the village of Fedje was an important trading place, with the small island of Kræmmerholmen being the location where the trading took place. Kræmmerholmen was reopened in 1991, and was a restaurant/hotel/museum area, but closed in September 2008. Fedje was previously a substantial producer of peat. The peat led to the construction of a railway. The railway was given up together with the peat industry in 1920.

During the Second World War Fedje was occupied by over 300 German soldiers. There are still remains of the German cannons and bunkers all over the island, especially in the western part close to the traffic station, which is actually built on the remains of a German radar station.

In February 1945, the German U-boat U-864 was sunk by the Royal Navy submarine HMS Venturer outside western Fedj, the only instance in history of a submarine being sunk by another submarine while both were submerged. The wreck of the U-boat was discovered in 2003 lying in 150 metres (490 ft) of water, 2 nmi (3.7 km; 2.3 mi) west of Fedje. Its cargo included 67 short tons (61 t) of mercury which was being shipped to Japan. Contained in 1,857 rusting steel bottles in the vessel's keel, the mercury was discovered to be leaking out and currently poses a severe environmental threat. The rusting mercury bottles, the delicate condition of the wreck, and the presence of live torpedoes aboard it make the raising or salvage of U-864 extremely hazardous, and it has instead been proposed that the wreck be entombed.

On 12 January 2007, M/V Server sunk outside Fedje. The ship leaked oil and caused major environmental damage. But due to intensive efforts to clean the coves and beaches, very few traces can be found today.

== Government ==
Fedje Municipality is responsible for primary education (through 10th grade), outpatient health services, senior citizen services, welfare and other social services, zoning, economic development, and municipal roads and utilities. The municipality is governed by a municipal council of directly elected representatives. The mayor is indirectly elected by a vote of the municipal council. The municipality is under the jurisdiction of the Hordaland District Court and the Gulating Court of Appeal.

=== Municipal council ===
The municipal council (Kommunestyre) of Fedje Municipality is made up of 15 representatives that are elected to four year terms. The tables below show the current and historical composition of the council by political party.

Fedje kommunestyre 2023–2027
Party name (in Nynorsk)	Number of representatives
Labour Party (Arbeidarpartiet)	6
Progress Party (Framstegspartiet)	2
Conservative Party (Høgre)	5
Total number of members:	15

Fedje kommunestyre 2019–2023
Party name (in Nynorsk)	Number of representatives
Labour Party (Arbeidarpartiet)	6
Progress Party (Framstegspartiet)	3
Conservative Party (Høgre)	6
Total number of members:	15

Fedje kommunestyre 2015–2019
Party name (in Nynorsk)	Number of representatives
Labour Party (Arbeidarpartiet)	3
Progress Party (Framstegspartiet)	2
Conservative Party (Høgre)	5
Christian Democratic Party (Kristeleg Folkeparti)	4
The Democrats (Demokratane)	1
Total number of members:	15

Fedje kommunestyre 2011–2015
Party name (in Nynorsk)	Number of representatives
Labour Party (Arbeidarpartiet)	5
Progress Party (Framstegspartiet)	2
Conservative Party (Høgre)	4
Christian Democratic Party (Kristeleg Folkeparti)	3
The Democrats (Demokratane)	1
Total number of members:	15

Fedje kommunestyre 2007–2011
Party name (in Nynorsk)	Number of representatives
Labour Party (Arbeidarpartiet)	6
Progress Party (Framstegspartiet)	3
Conservative Party (Høgre)	3
Christian Democratic Party (Kristeleg Folkeparti)	4
The Democrats (Demokratane)	1
Total number of members:	17

Fedje kommunestyre 2003–2007
Party name (in Nynorsk)	Number of representatives
Labour Party (Arbeidarpartiet)	4
Progress Party (Framstegspartiet)	3
Conservative Party (Høgre)	4
Christian Democratic Party (Kristeleg Folkeparti)	4
The Democrats (Demokratane)	2
Total number of members:	17

Fedje kommunestyre 1999–2003
Party name (in Nynorsk)	Number of representatives
Labour Party (Arbeidarpartiet)	4
Progress Party (Framstegspartiet)	3
Conservative Party (Høgre)	5
Christian Democratic Party (Kristeleg Folkeparti)	5
Total number of members:	17

Fedje kommunestyre 1995–1999
Party name (in Nynorsk)	Number of representatives
Labour Party (Arbeidarpartiet)	5
Progress Party (Framstegspartiet)	3
Conservative Party (Høgre)	4
Christian Democratic Party (Kristeleg Folkeparti)	5
Total number of members:	17

Fedje kommunestyre 1991–1995
Party name (in Nynorsk)	Number of representatives
Labour Party (Arbeidarpartiet)	5
Progress Party (Framstegspartiet)	2
Conservative Party (Høgre)	5
Christian Democratic Party (Kristeleg Folkeparti)	5
Total number of members:	17

Fedje kommunestyre 1987–1991
Party name (in Nynorsk)	Number of representatives
Labour Party (Arbeidarpartiet)	6
Conservative Party (Høgre)	6
Christian Democratic Party (Kristeleg Folkeparti)	5
Total number of members:	17

Fedje kommunestyre 1983–1987
Party name (in Nynorsk)	Number of representatives
Labour Party (Arbeidarpartiet)	6
Conservative Party (Høgre)	6
Christian Democratic Party (Kristeleg Folkeparti)	4
Liberal People's Party (Liberale Folkepartiet)	1
Total number of members:	17

Fedje kommunestyre 1979–1983
Party name (in Nynorsk)	Number of representatives
Labour Party (Arbeidarpartiet)	6
Conservative Party (Høgre)	5
Christian Democratic Party (Kristeleg Folkeparti)	4
New People's Party (Nye Folkepartiet)	2
Total number of members:	17

Fedje kommunestyre 1975–1979
Party name (in Nynorsk)	Number of representatives
Labour Party (Arbeidarpartiet)	4
Conservative Party (Høgre)	2
Christian Democratic Party (Kristeleg Folkeparti)	3
New People's Party (Nye Folkepartiet)	2
Centre Party (Senterpartiet)	1
Non-party women's list (Upolitisk Kvinneliste)	1
Total number of members:	13

Fedje kommunestyre 1971–1975
Party name (in Nynorsk)	Number of representatives
Labour Party (Arbeidarpartiet)	3
Liberal Party (Venstre)	6
Local List(s) (Lokale lister)	4
Total number of members:	13

Fedje kommunestyre 1967–1971
Party name (in Nynorsk)	Number of representatives
Labour Party (Arbeidarpartiet)	2
Christian Democratic Party (Kristeleg Folkeparti)	4
Liberal Party (Venstre)	4
Local List(s) (Lokale lister)	3
Total number of members:	13

Fedje kommunestyre 1963–1967
Party name (in Nynorsk)	Number of representatives
Local List(s) (Lokale lister)	13
Total number of members:	13

Fedje heradsstyre 1959–1963
Party name (in Nynorsk)	Number of representatives
Local List(s) (Lokale lister)	13
Total number of members:	13

Fedje heradsstyre 1955–1959
Party name (in Nynorsk)	Number of representatives
Local List(s) (Lokale lister)	13
Total number of members:	13

Fedje heradsstyre 1951–1955
Party name (in Nynorsk)	Number of representatives
Local List(s) (Lokale lister)	12
Total number of members:	12

Fedje heradsstyre 1947–1951
Party name (in Nynorsk)	Number of representatives
Local List(s) (Lokale lister)	12
Total number of members:	12
Note: On 1 January 1947, Fedje Municipality was separated from Austrheim Municipality.

=== Mayors ===
The mayor (Nynorsk: ordførar) of Fedje Municipality is the political leader of the municipality and the chairperson of the municipal council. Here is a list of people who have held this position:

- 1947–1947: Mons Storemark
- 1948–1975: Oskar Tangen (V)
- 1976–1979: Karl Storhaug (DNF)
- 1980–1989: Erling Walderhaug (H)
- 1990–1991: Ove Villanger (KrF)
- 1992–1995: Erling Walderhaug (H)
- 1995–2003: Vilgjerd Storset Husa (KrF)
- 2003–2007: Erling Walderhaug (H)
- 2007–2015: Kristin Handeland (Ap)
- 2015–present: Stian Herøy (H)

=== Police ===
In 2016, the chief of police for Vestlandet formally suggested a reconfiguration of police districts and stations. He proposed that the police station in Fedje be closed. The municipality is now covered by the Nordhordland police station with is part of the West Police District.

== Geography ==
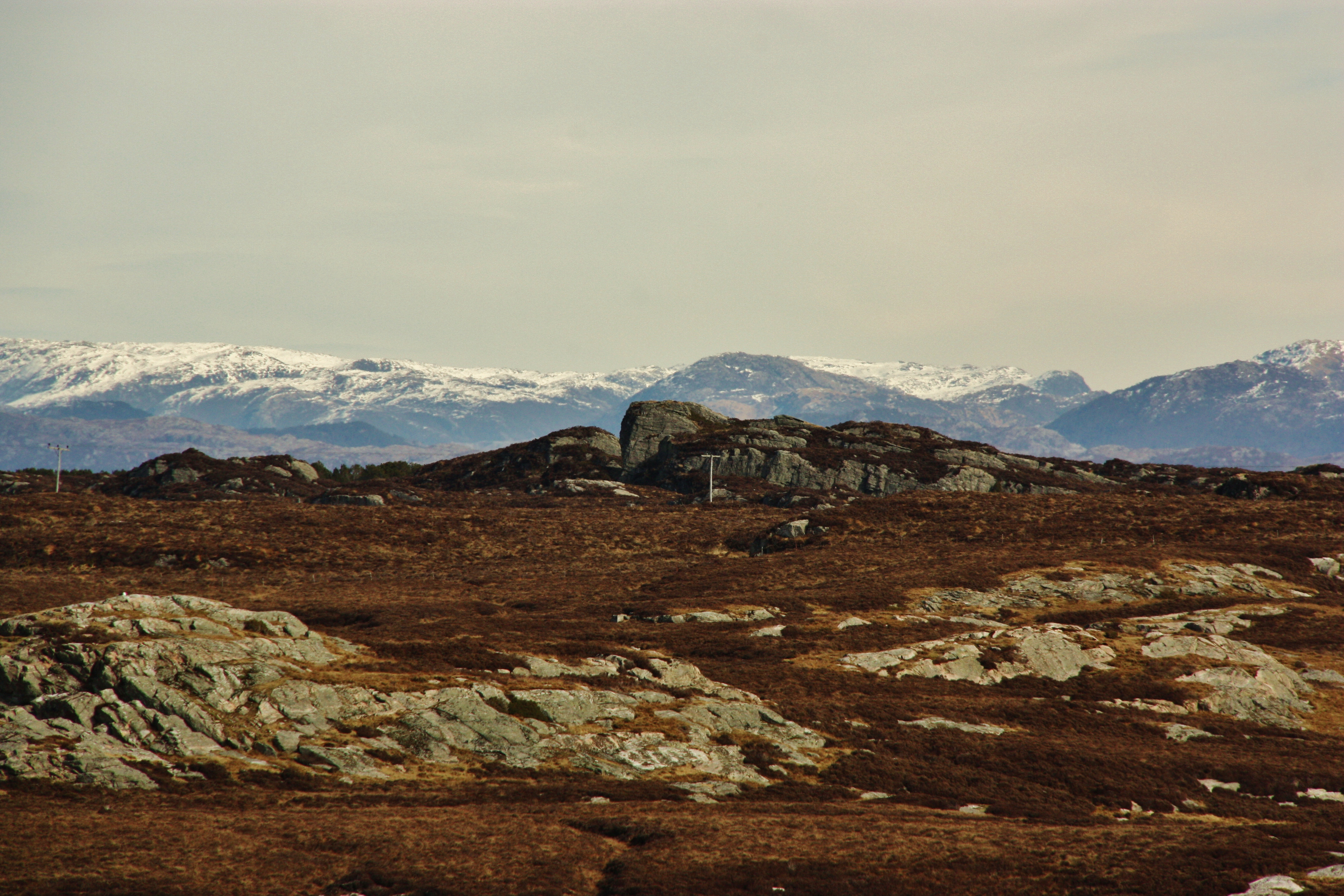
View of Fedjebjørnen

The highest point in the municipality is the 42.16-metre (138.3 ft) tall mountain Fedjebjørnen located on the island of Fedje.. The largest lake is Storevatnet.

=== Islands ===
Other than the main island of Fedje, the best known smaller island is called Holmengrå, which is the site of the 35-metre (115 ft) tall Holmengrå Lighthouse. In the southern part of Fedje which is called Stormark, there is a lighthouse called Hellisøy Lighthouse, maybe the most famous feature in the municipality. Hellisøy Lighthouse was built in 1855. The 32.3-metre (106 ft) tall tower is painted red and white. The islands of Fedje are all located on the western side of the Fedjefjorden.

== Population ==
The population of the island community is decreasing due to the high percentage of people over 60 years (25% as of 1 January 2003), and because many people decide to move from the island, many because of the lack of work. The island municipality is also not connected to the national road network, so people must use an airplane or boat to get to other parts of Norway.

Most of the people live on the lagoon-like northern part of the island in the village of Fedje where there is a grocery store, Fedje Church, and the ferry quay. Fedje Municipality was historically inhabited by fishermen and whalers. These days many are working on commercial ships or in the oil industry. By doing so they can still live on the island without having to work there.

Historical population
Year	1947	1951	1960	1970	1980	1990	2000	2010	2020	2023
Pop.	920	940	932	873	849	730	682	594	548	513
±% p.a.	—	+0.54%	−0.09%	−0.65%	−0.28%	−1.50%	−0.68%	−1.37%	−0.80%	−2.18%
Source: Statistics Norway and Norwegian Historical Data Centre

== Sports ==
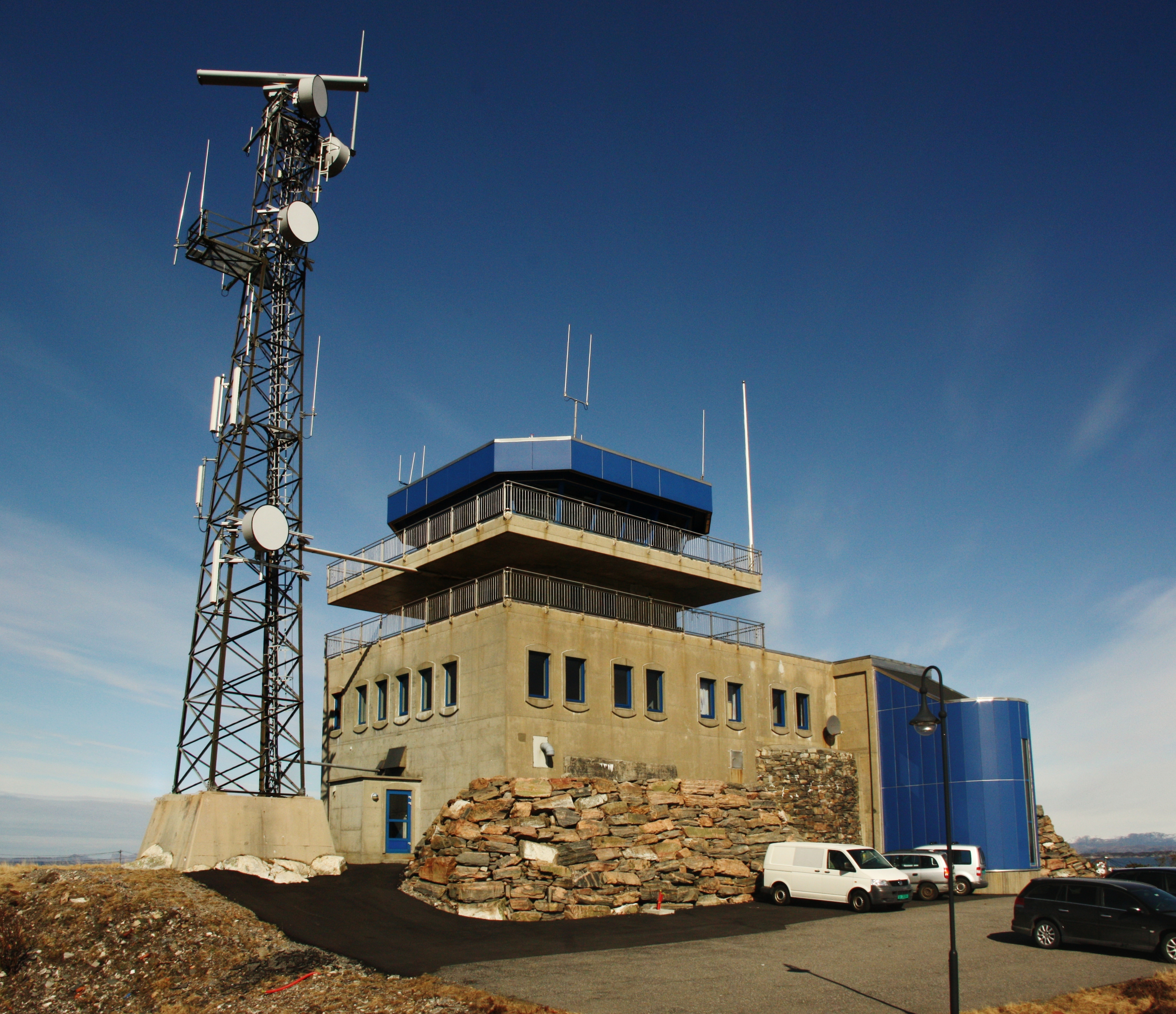
Fedje Vessel Traffic Service Centre

The main sporting activity on Fedje is football, which can be played on the football grounds in the eastern part of the island. The football ground is also the home ground of the local football team called Fedje A-lag. The club is currently playing in the Norwegian 6th division.

Swimming is also popular, as there is a beautiful beach located on Fedje, which is to be found in the centre of the island on the shoreline of Lake Husavatnet. The water is clean and brackish, as it has a small opening to the sea which makes the tide flush it with sea water from time to time.

== Infrastructure ==
Fedje Vessel Traffic Service Centre has been operating since 1 September 1992. It surveys the coast to allow safe passage to Mongstad and Sture. It also serves as a pilot station. Next to the station is Fedje Heliport, Høgden.

The island is supplied with power, telephone, and internet cables from an underwater cordless router to the mainland. A ferry, crossing 20 times a day, connects Fedje to the mainland. The voyage lasts for about 30 minutes. Fedje is about a 1-hour 40 minute drive (including a 30-minute ferry voyage) from the city of Bergen.

== Notable people ==
- Gisle Handeland (born 1943 in Fedje), a Norwegian politician who was county mayor of Hordaland from 1993-2003
- Vidar Kleppe (born 1963), a somewhat controversial Norwegian politician who was brought up in Fedje
