= Seløyna =

Island in Vestland, Norway

Seløyna Seløyni (historic)
- Interactive map of the island

Geography
- Location: Vestland, Norway
- Coordinates: 60.6470°N 4.8086°E
- Area: 8.7 km^{2} (3.4 sq mi)
- Length: 4 km (2.5 mi)
- Width: 2.3 km (1.43 mi)
- Highest elevation: 54 m (177 ft)
- Highest point: Selstakken

Administration
- Norway
- County: Vestland
- Municipality: Øygarden Municipality

Seløyna is an island in Øygarden Municipality in Vestland county, Norway. The 8.7-square-kilometre (3.4 sq mi) island is the northernmost of the large populated islands in the Øygarden archipelago. It is connected to the island of Alvøyna by a short bridge over the Vikesundet strait. The small island of Førehjelmo lies just to the north of Seløyna, and there is a small bridge connecting to it.

== History ==
The island was once part of the old Hjelme Municipality which existed until 1964. The island is home to two churches: the Old Hjelme Church (founded in 1875) in the small, coastal village of Hjelmo and the "new" Hjelme Church (founded in 1971) centrally located along the main road crossing the island of Seløyna.

== See also ==
- List of islands of Norway
