= Fedje (island) =

Island in Vestland, Norway

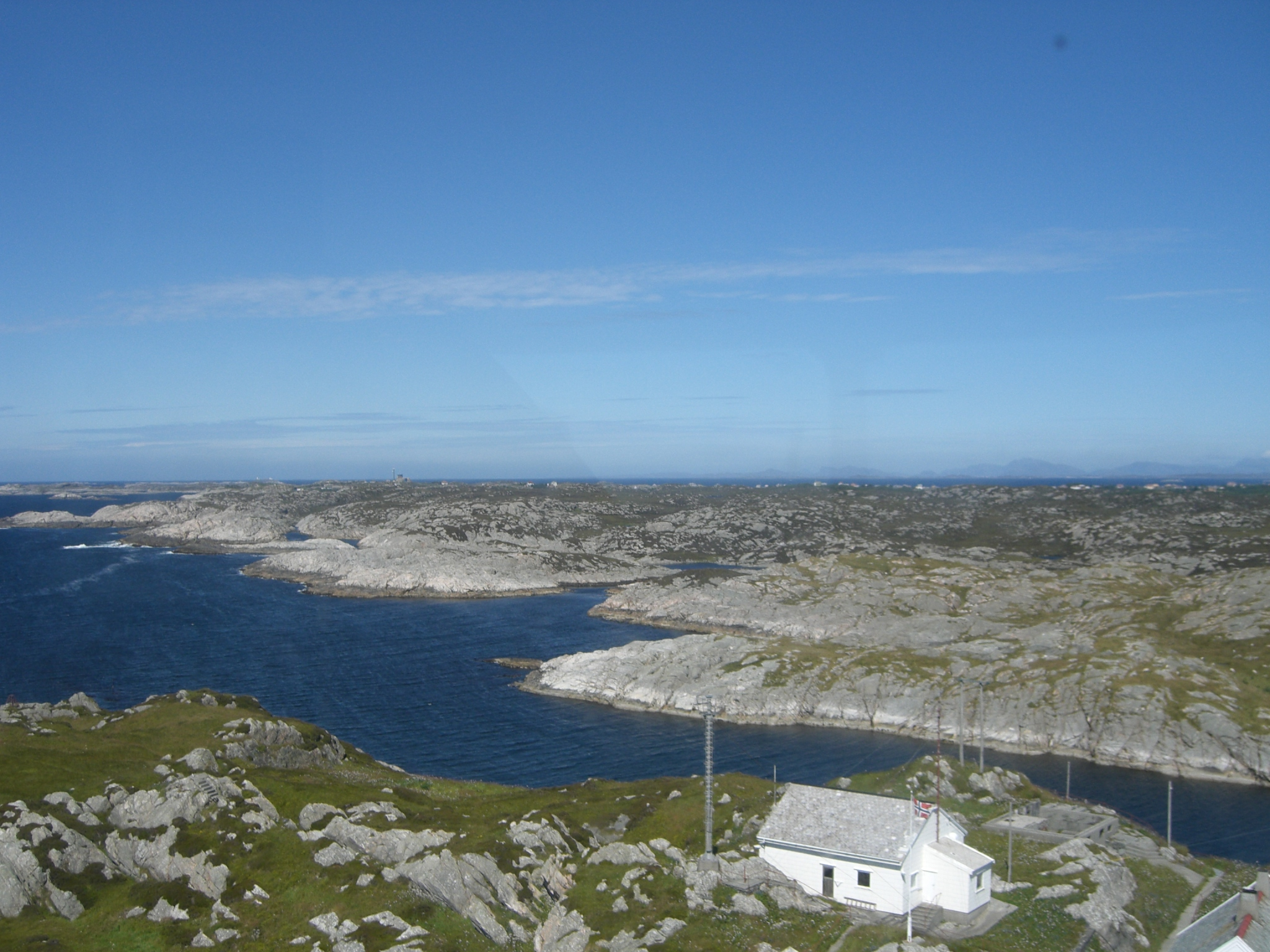
- View of the south end of the island
- Interactive map of Fedje

Geography
- Location: Vestland, Norway
- Coordinates: 60.76768°N 4.71508°E
- Area: 7.2 km^{2} (2.8 sq mi)
- Length: 4 km (2.5 mi)
- Width: 2.5 km (1.55 mi)
- Highest elevation: 47 m (154 ft)
- Highest point: Fedjebjørnen

Administration
- Norway
- County: Vestland
- Municipality: Fedje Municipality

Fedje is the largest island in Fedje Municipality in Vestland county, Norway. The 7.2-square-kilometre (2.8 sq mi) island is home to almost all of the municipality's residents. The island sits west of the Fedjefjorden, south of the mouth of the Fensfjorden, and north of the islands of Øygarden Municipality. The North Sea lies to the west of the island. The main population center on the island is the village of Fedje on the northern coast of the island. The southern coast of the island is the site of the other village on the island, Stormark. The 47-metre (154 ft) tall Fedjebjørnen is the highest point on the island. Hellisøy Lighthouse lies just off the southwestern coast of the island.

== See also ==
- List of islands of Norway
