= Northern European Enclosure Dam =

Proposed enclosure of the North Sea

The Northern European Enclosure Dam (NEED) is a proposed solution to the problem of rising ocean levels in Northern Europe. It would be a megaproject, involving the construction of two massive dams in the English Channel and the North Sea; the former between France and England, and the latter between Scotland and Norway. The concept was conceived by the oceanographers Sjoerd Groeskamp and Joakim Kjellsson.

As of 2020, the scheme remains a thought experiment intended to portray engineered solutions to the effects of climate change as too "extreme" to be pursued. The scheme's authors describe it as "more of a warning than a solution".

Groeskamp estimates that the NEED will cost 250 to 500 billion euros and will take 50 to 100 years to complete. Groeskamp, an oceanographer, has not revealed how he determined the cost projection or construction timetable.

== Channel Dam ==
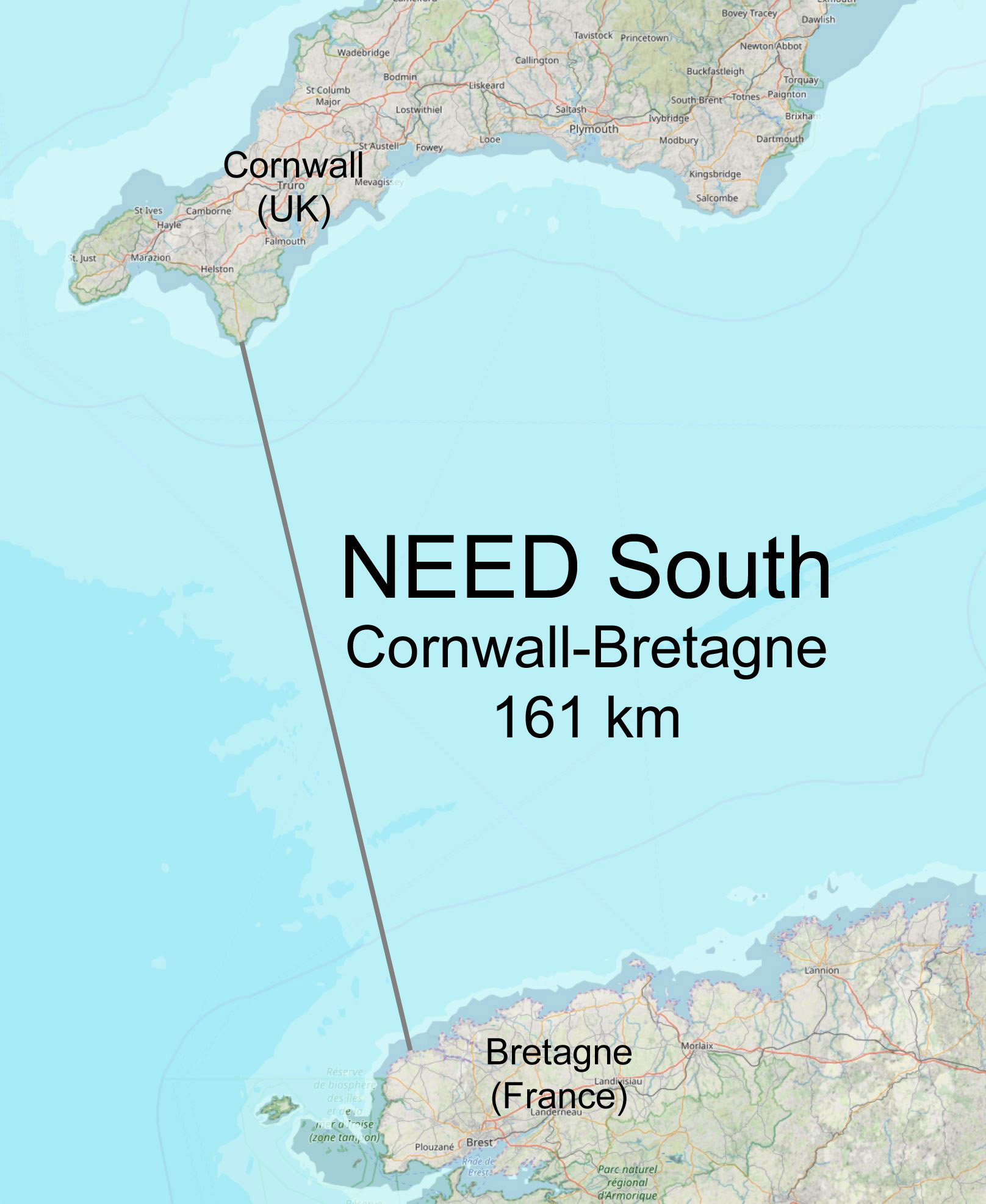
North European Enclosure Dam (NEED) South

The southern enclosure (NEED South) would be a single dam across the Channel between The Lizard, Cornwall, England in the north and Plouescat, Ploudalmézeau, Brittany, France in the south. The stipulated length is 161 kilometres (100 mi), with an average depth of about 85 metres (279 ft) and a maximum depth of 102 metres (335 ft).

== North Sea Dam ==
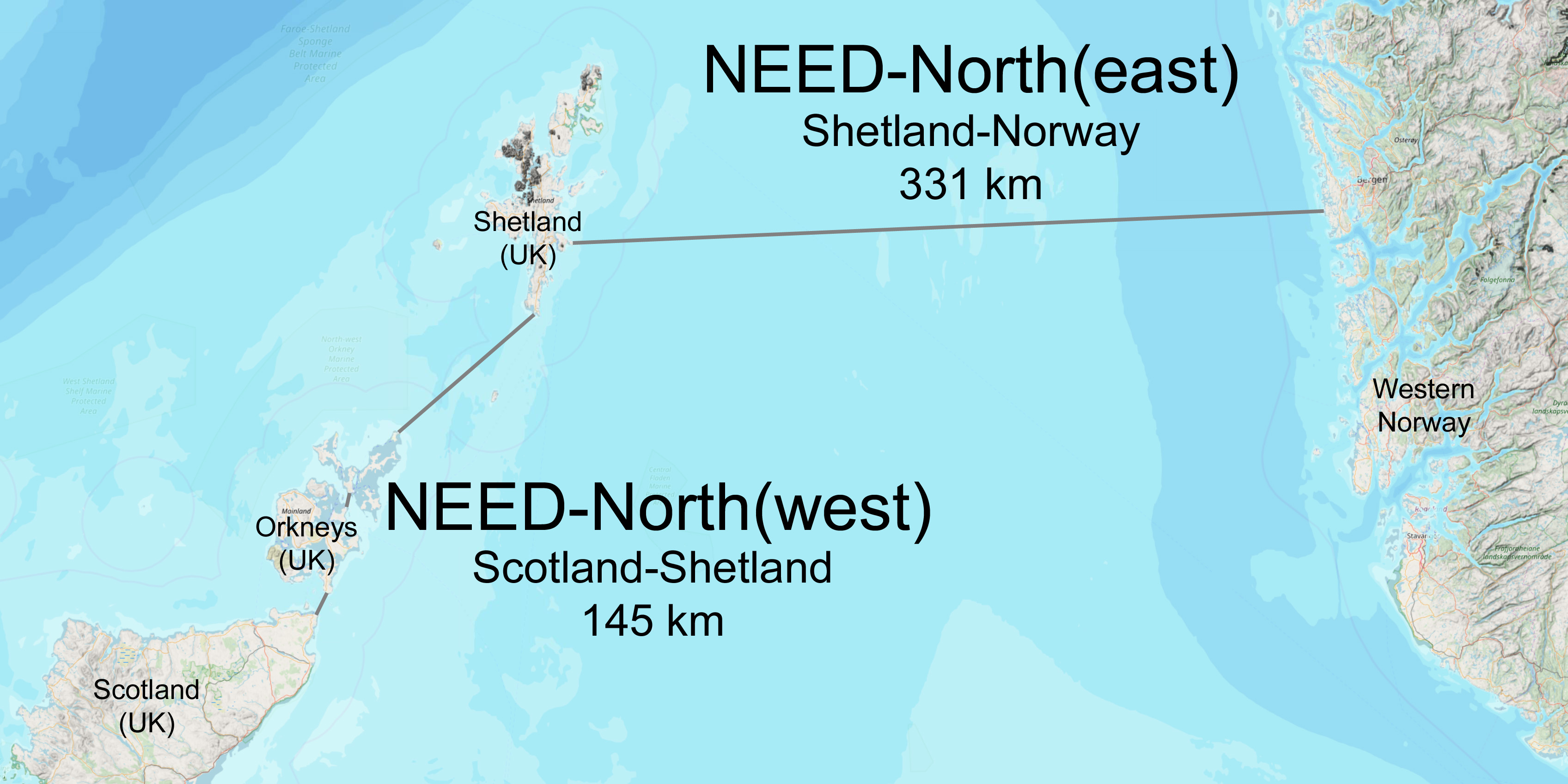
North European Enclosure Dam (NEED) North

The northern enclosure (NEED North) would be a multiple section dam at the perimeter of the northern rim of the North Sea. The detailed engineering is not stated, although some form of continuous structure could provide for overland infrastructure—road and/or railway between Great Britain and Norway.

=== Scotland–Shetland ===
The western section of the North Sea Dam would be an island jumping, from mainland Scotland in the southwest, through the Orkney Island to Shetland in the northeast, with a total length stipulated to 145 km.

The first stretch origin at Duncansby Head, Caithness, mainland Scotland and crossing Pentland Firth to Brough Ness, the southern tip of South Ronaldsay in the Orkney Islands. Although being a narrow strait of 10 km, the sea floor is down to 100 m depth.

The stretch through southern Orkney continues to Burray, over the narrow Skerry Sound to Mainland and passing the 4 km wide and 30 m deep Shapinsay Sound to Shapinsay. From its northern tip Ness of Ork, the 6 km wide and 110 m deep Stronsay Firth is crossed to War Ness, the southern tip of Eday. The stretch through northern Orkney continues eastward over the 2 km wide and 22 m deep Eday Sound to Sanday. From its northern tip Tofts Ness, the 4 km wide and 20 m deep North Ronaldsay Firth is crossed to Strom Ness on North Ronaldsay, the northernmost of the Orkney Islands.

The crossing of the Fair Isle Channel, between Dennis Head, North Ronaldsey and Scat Ness, the southern tip of Mainland, Shetland, would be the first open waters section of the North Sea Dam, with a distance of exactly 80 km and water depths down to 110 m. A dam across the shortest distance between the two archipelagos would leave Fair Isle placed within the enclosure.

=== Shetland–Western Norway ===
The eastern section of the North Sea Dam would offer the greatest engineering challenge of the whole NEED project, stipulated to a length of 331 km through open water and with the sea floor depths exceeding 300 m in the Norwegian trench.

The dam would originate from the eastern shores of Mainland, Shetland, just north of Lerwick, heading east to Bressay and Isle of Noss to allow for the shortest ocean crossing towards Sotra island in Vestland on the western coast of Norway.

The ocean floor east of Shetland dives down to depths below 100 m just 1 km off shore, and then continues fairly flat through Bressay Ground and Viking bank for some 210 km, until the deep decline of the Norwegian trench. Here, being the latter part of the sea crossing, the sea floor reaches some 321 m depth within 5 km from the western Norwegian coast where there is a steep incline.

=== Norwegian internal waters ===
For the NEED to work, Norwegian internal waters have to be enclosed as well, as the Sotra terminus of the North Sea Dam is an island. With the shortest distance for the crossing from Shetland, the dam will reach the western shore of Sotra, just off Telavåg. The final part of the enclosure would therefore have to be the crossing of the narrow, but deep sound separating Sotra from mainland Norway close to Bergen.

Several alternatives are viable, one being the route crossing the 1-kilometre (0.62 mi) wide and some 140-metre (460 ft) deep Lerøyosen sound from southern Sotra, the islands of Lerøyna, Bjelkarøyna, and Storakinna to the seemingly mainland south of Hjellestad, a total distance of 5 kilometres (3.1 mi). As the latter lies on an island, the very narrow Ådlandstraumen would have to be closed, to make a complete enclosure.

A more northerly route from Sotra would cross the 650-metre (2,130 ft) wide and 90-metre (300 ft) deep Kobbaleia sound, the islands of Tyssøyna and Alvøyna, and finally the 1-kilometre (0.62 mi) wide and 100-metre (330 ft) deep Raunefjorden sound to the mainland just off Flesland, Bergen International Airport.

There is also a possibility that Norway would include an enclosure of Bergen, which has faced many floods in recent years, and in that case the first part of the enclosure dam would be between Sotra and Askøy, and the second between Askøy and mainland Norway, crossing Byfjorden north of the city center of Bergen.

== Images ==
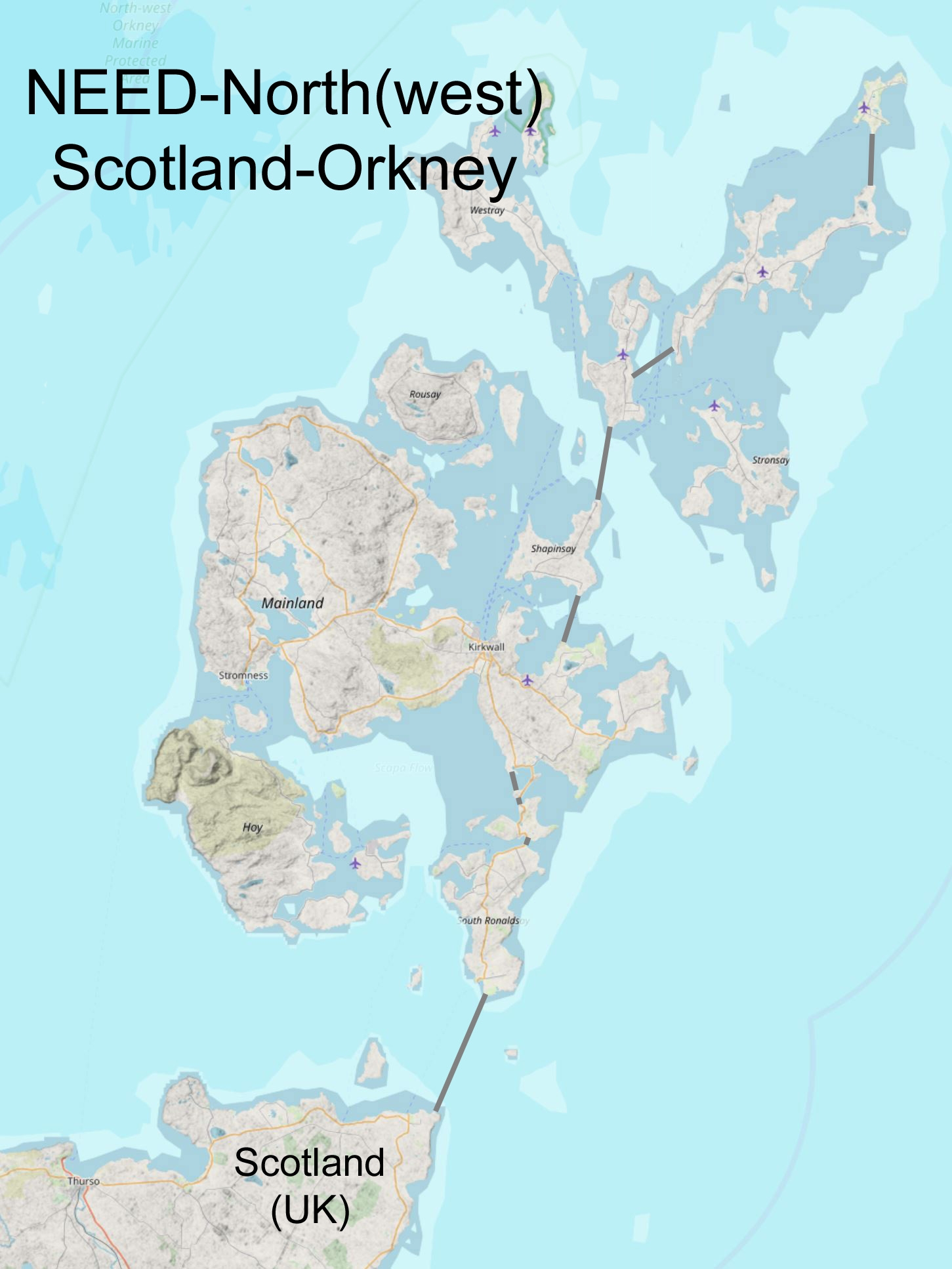
North European Enclosure Dam (NEED) from Scotland to Orkney

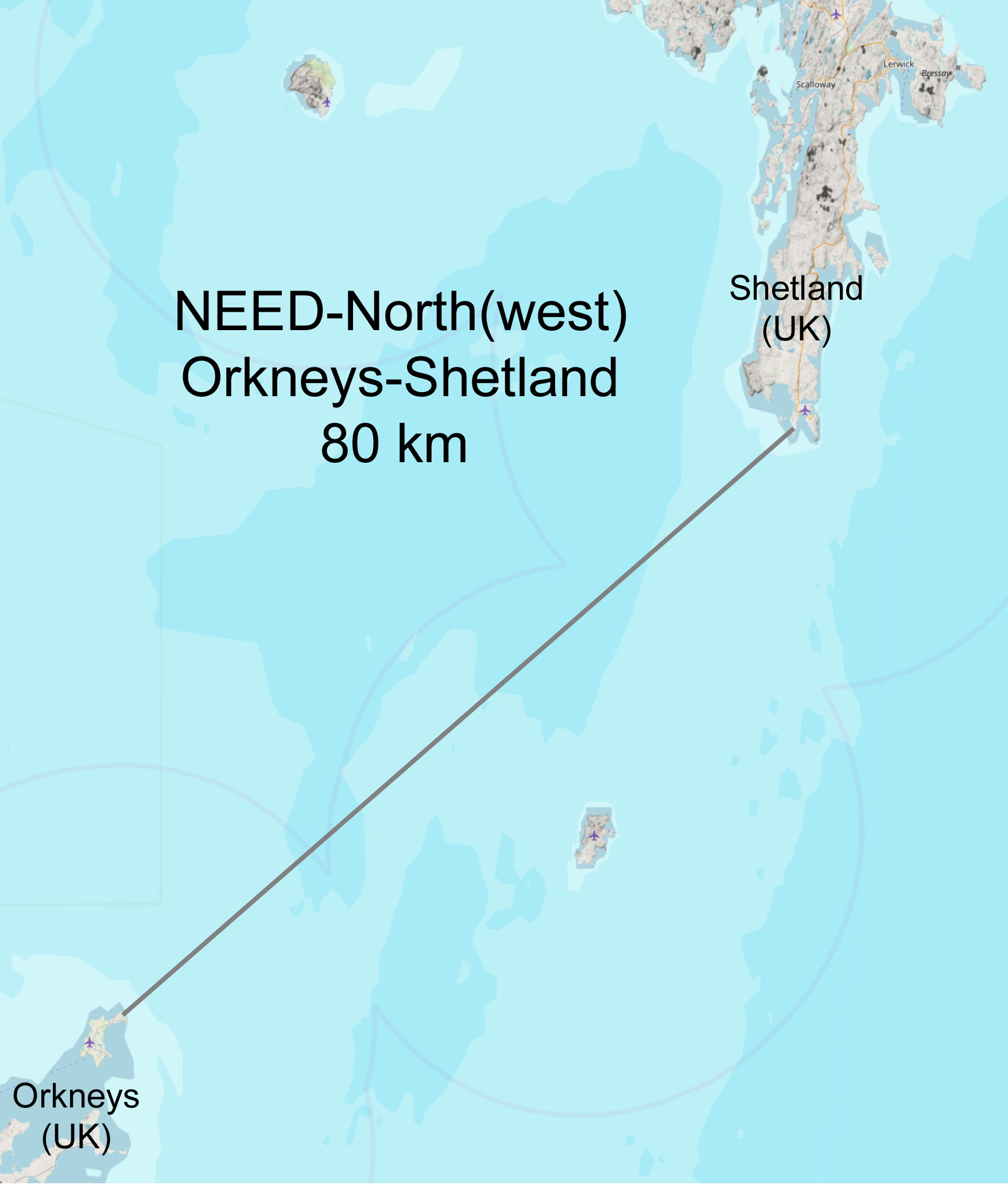
North European Enclosure Dam (NEED) North from Orkney to Shetland

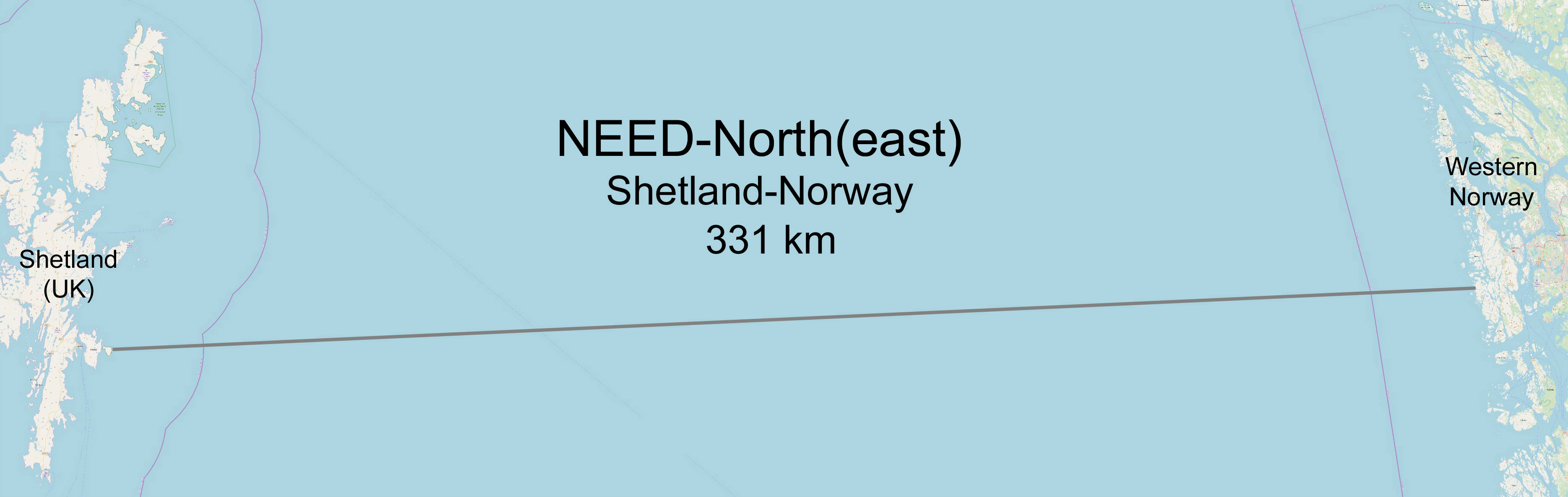
North European Enclosure Dam (NEED) North from Shetland to Western Norway

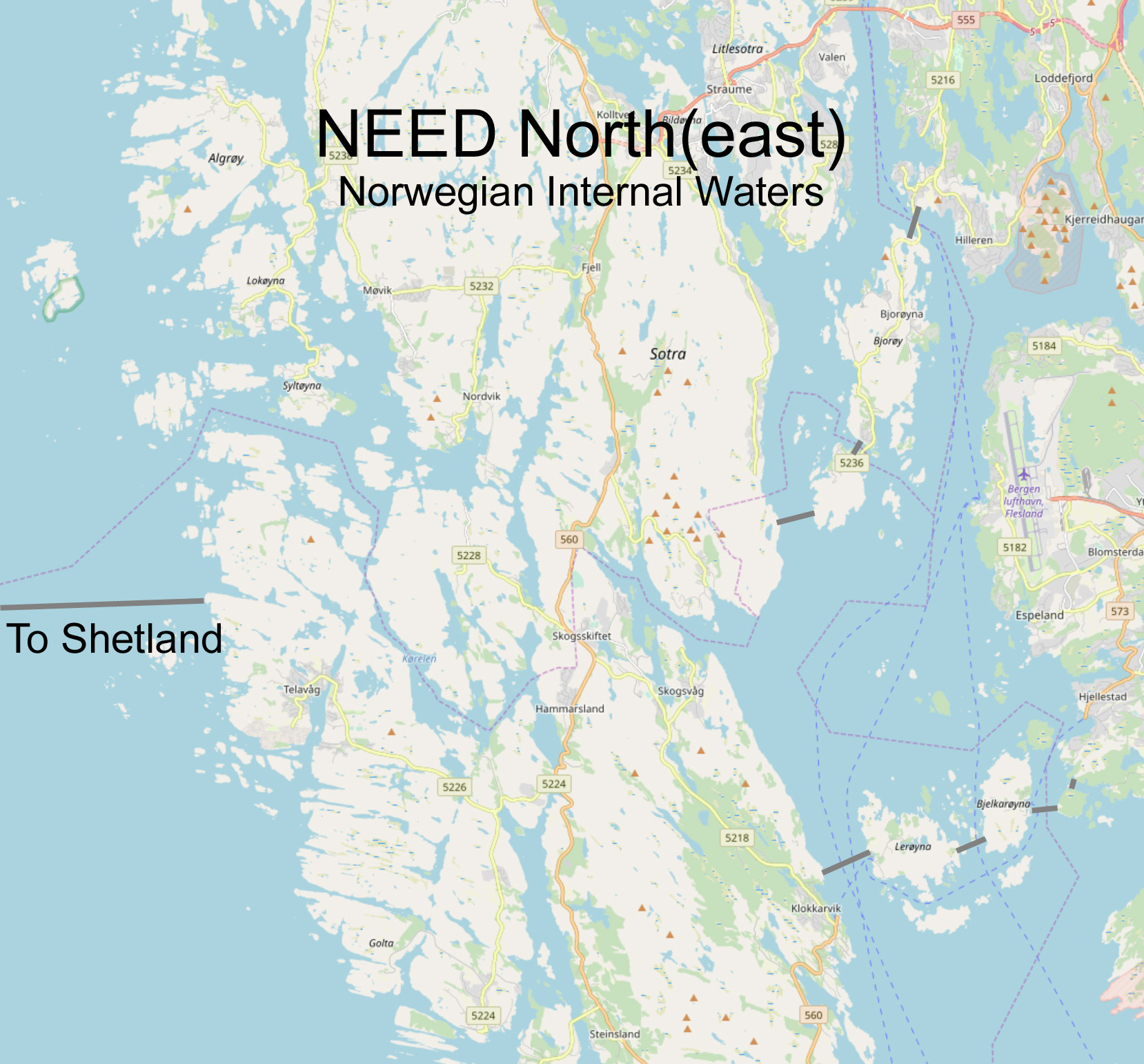
North European Enclosure Dam (NEED) North from Sotra to mainland Norway

== See also ==
- Atlantropa
