= Bjorøy Tunnel =

Subsea road tunnel in Vestland, Norway

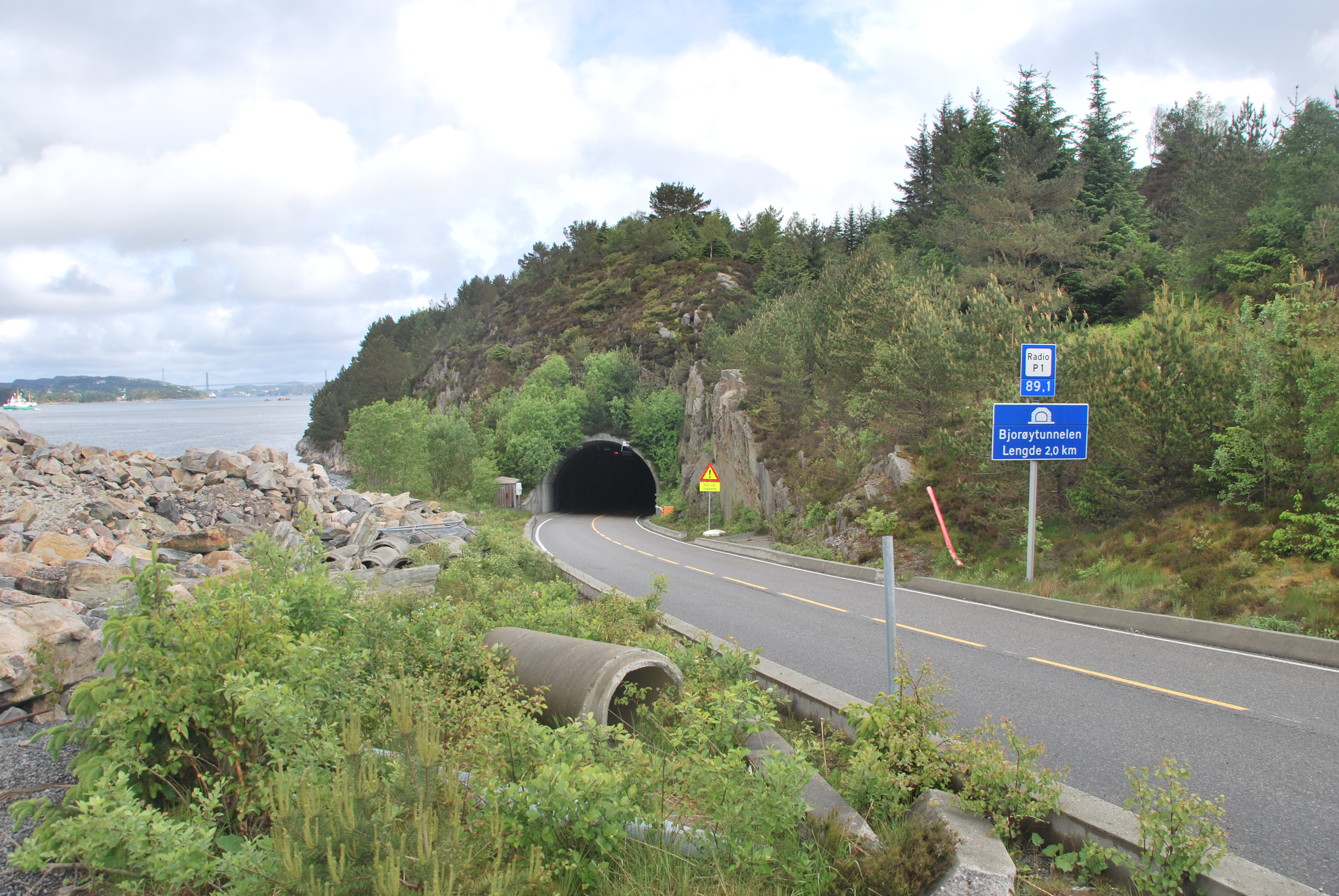
- Interactive map of Bjorøy Tunnel

Overview
- Location: Øygarden and Bergen, Norway
- Coordinates: 60°20′15″N 5°11′03″E
- Status: In use
- Route: Fv 5236
- Start: Håkonshella
- End: Bjorøyna

Operation
- Work began: 29 September 1993
- Opened: 7 May 1996
- Operator: Norwegian Public Roads Administration
- Toll: Until 29 January 2005

Technical
- Length: 2,012 m (6,601 ft)
- No. of lanes: 2
- Min elevation: −88 m (−289 ft)
- Grade: 18%

The Bjorøy Tunnel (Norwegian: Bjorøytunnelen) is a 2,012-metre-long (6,601 ft) subsea road tunnel in Vestland county, Norway. The tunnel is part of the Norwegian County Road 5236 which connects the island of Bjorøyna in Øygarden Municipality to the mainland near Håkonshella and Hilleren in Bergen Municipality. It crosses underneath the Vatlestraumen strait, reaching 88 metres (289 ft) below mean sea level. It serves as a fixed link for the 900 residents of the islands of Bjorøyna and Tyssøyna as well as a large number of cottage owners who vacation on the islands. The first proposal was launched in 1980, and construction started on 29 September 1993. There were severe problems because the tunneling encountered an area of sandstone, causing a year's delay. The total construction cost was 59 million kr. It opened on 7 May 1996 and remained a toll road until 29 January 2005.

== Specifications ==
The Bjorøy Tunnel is a subsea tunnel which runs below the Vatlestraumen strait between the island of Bjorøy and the mainland of Bergen. It carries two lanes of Norwegian County Road 5236. It is the only fixed link for the islands of Bjorøy and Tyssøy (Tyssøy is connected to Bjorøy by a bridge). The tunnel is 2,012 metres (6,601 ft) long and reaches 88 m (289 ft) below mean sea level. The maximum gradient is 10 degrees (about 18% grade). It is one of few tunnels in Norway without mobile telephone coverage, although there are emergency telephones that connect to the operation center of the Norwegian Public Roads Administration, and the tunnel will receive coverage with the future Norwegian Public Safety Radio.

Before the construction of the Bjorøy Tunnel, the geology of the area was thought to consist entirely of metamorphic basement rocks similar to those exposed on the surrounding islands. The Jurassic sediments encountered in the tunnel included breccia and conglomerate in contact with the underlying gneisses and a sandstone with coal fragments, some of which was quite unconsolidated. Spore and pollen samples gave an Oxfordian age (Late Jurassic) for the sequence. The sedimentary rocks appear to have been deposited into an eroded depression caused by a fault zone, which later reactivated, disrupting the bedding and causing steep dips.

== History ==
Map of Bjorøy and the surrounding area

=== Planning ===
Since 1966, Bjorøyna had been served by the Alvøen–Bjorøyhamn Ferry. The plans for a tunnel to Bjorøyna were first launched by the engineer Jack Jahnsen in 1980. These were based on the then under construction 2,890-metre (9,480 ft) Vardø Tunnel, which became the first subsea tunnel in Norway when it opened in 1982. He had a meeting at his place on 18 December 1980, to which the three municipal councilors from Bjorøyna also were invited, where he tried to get support for the tunnel, which would be the topic of a municipal council meeting on 20 December. The council unanimously voted in favour of establishing a committee to look into the tunnel. The committee was established on 6 January 1981 and concluded that there were three alternative possibilities to build a fixed link to Bjorøyna: a bridge from the island over Søre Steinsundet via Vestre Steinsundholmen, Kjerringholmen and Kaggen to Søre Snekkevik on Litlesotra; a tunnel under Vatlestraumen to Håkonshella; or a bridge over Vatlestraumen to Håkonshella or Kongshaug.

At the time, a bridge to Litlesotra was estimated to cost 111 million kr, a tunnel was estimated to cost 36 million kr, while a bridge over Vatlestraumen was estimated to cost 74 million kr. All three included a road connection to Tyssøyna, with the bridge proposals costing 16 million kr for the Tyssøyna connection, and the tunnel having a cost of 4 million kr, in part because the earthworks volume from the tunnel could be used to build a mole with a short bridge. Seismology tests conducted in August 1983 concluded that the ground had good conditions: the uncompacted material laid mostly only 1-meter (3 ft 3 in) deep, albeit at times as deep as 7 meters (23 ft). The proposed tunnel crossing followed a mountain ridge, and the maximum depth was between 40 and 45 metres (131 and 148 ft), although the topography went steep down to those depths.

The plans were presented to Johan J. Jakobsen, Minister of Transport and Communications, and cooperation was started with the Norwegian Public Roads Administration to find a suitable connection to Tyssøy, so that they could also take advantage of the tunnel. To connect the two islands, it was chosen to build across Nautasundet, which was shallow and 175 metres (574 ft) wide. In 1987, Kaare Hartman joined the committee and proposed that the tunnel be built with borrowed money, guaranteed by land-owners on the islands, and repaid using tolls. At the time the project was not on any prioritized investment list, and this way the project was not dependent on public grants. On 7 September 1987, Hartmann reached agreement with Norges Skibshypotek to borrow the estimated 50 million kr. The bank had a guarantee in the income from the tunnel.

However, Norges Skibshypotek had to withdraw, as it was not permitted to invest in non-shipping investments. Instead, a loan was taken in Bergens Skillingsbank. Four land-owners made a guarantee for NOK 9 million, with a judicial registration covering an area of 347 hectares (860 acres). They hoped that the value of their land would increase after the tunnel had been built. The same amount was also guaranteed by Fjell Municipality. Public grants were also secured, so the debt would be NOK 27 to 30 million. The planning was done by Chr. F. Grøner, for which the municipality paid the costs. Statistics from the ferry showed that 26,400 cars and 93,902 people had taken it in 1986, which had grown to 40,400 and 121,000 in 1989. The estimates were for a 90% increase until 2000, given an opening in 2002. A bid for the project was gathered from Selmer–Furuholmen, which gave a maximum price of NOK 55 million, given that construction started in 1989.

On 12 December 1989, the committee sent an official offer to Hordaland Public Roads Administration whereby they, as a company under establishment, offered to fully finance the tunnel. The plans called for tolls of 51 kr for a car and an investment cost of NOK 47 million. The plans were at first nearly discarded by the administration, as they felt it was impossible for a community of 400 people to finance such a large project without other grants. However, it became evident that the administration was spending NOK 2 million per year on the ferry service, and as the ferry soon would have to be replaced, this would increase to NOK 3 to 5 million per year. On 1 October 1990, the issue was considered by Hordaland Transport Board, which approved the plans. This was followed up by Hordaland County Council on 19 June 1991, which involved NOK 27 million being financed by debt and NOK 28 to 33 million being financed through reduced subsidies to the ferry.

The plans were met with criticism from locals on the Bergen side where the tunnel would emerge. They stated that the plans had "cheap solutions" and had unnecessary negative impact on their local environment. This included the demolishing of a football field and lack of noise barriers. Bergen Municipality demanded that the costs of a new field be paid for by the project, and that the tunnel be slightly extended. A new estimate was made, which increased the price by NOK 10.3 million; however, Hordaland Public Roads Administration protested, stating that it would give an inferior road technically, that the existing development plans permitted the construction, and that the noise would not exceed the permitted limits. They concluded that should these demands remain, the increased costs would terminate the project. On 16 November 1992, Bergen City Council voted to allow the tunnel, under the condition that the tunnel project financed a new football field. The decision was appealed by lawyers representing the local community, but this was rejected by Hordaland County Governor on 30 August 1993.

Originally the unlimited company Bjorøy og Tyssøy ANS had been established with capital from locals, but instead the company Fastlandssambandet Bjorøy – Tyssøy AS was established on 29 September 1993. Capital for NOK 40,000 was paid by Fjell Municipality, NOK 20,000 by Sund Municipality and NOK 10,000 by Jack Jahnsen. The plans were sent to the Ministry of Transport and Communications in October 1992, who started working on a proposal for parliament in January 1993. Issues raised by the ministry were that the loans had been issued in 1987, and whether the land estimated value of the guaranteed real estate was real. The project was presented to the Parliament of Norway, who must approve all toll roads. By then the costs were estimated at NOK 61.5 million, including NOK 4.5 million in ordinary county grants and NOK 30 million in extraordinary county grants. The proposal estimated annual toll collection costs to NOK 825,000, with the collection taking place at Bjorøy. It was originally planned that the toll plaza would be staffed between 06:00 and 22:00, meaning passing would be free at night.

An agreement was made between the ministry, the tunnel company and the county municipality on 6 January 1994 to build the tunnel. The company had the right to collect tolls for up to 15 years on fees dictated by the county municipality, and would have to pay NOK 27 million for the tunnel, with the county paying the rest of the costs. The construction would be the responsibility of Hordaland Public Roads Administration, with the tunnel company only responsible for their part of the financing and the collection of tolls. An agreement was made with Selmer, whereby they would charge NOK 59,422,500 and take the risk of the project, including any expenditures for unknown geological conditions or similar costs increases. They were also responsible for an insurance to reclaim the investments should it prove impossible to build the tunnel.

=== Construction ===
The construction of the tunnel started on 29 September 1993, with the original plans calling for the tunnel to open on 15 June 1995. The original construction consisted of blasting from Bjorøy, but by January 1994 there were problems with water leaks through cracks. The contractor described these as "common problems" when building tunnels, but that construction would be delayed by up to two weeks. To keep up with the schedule, the company started also blasting from the mainland. However, the problems increased, and by September the tunnel was leaking 600 liters (130 imp gal; 160 U.S. gal) per minute, which was 50% more than estimated. This caused extra work to be done on the exterior to the tunnel, and costs had increased by several tens of millions of kroner. In particular, a different type of rock had been struck, and 60 tonnes (59 long tons; 66 short tons) of concrete had been injected without this giving the desired effects.

On 30 September, Selmer stopped construction from the Bjorøy side, although it continued from the mainland. About 750 metres (2,460 ft) from the Bjorøy side, the construction found a section of sandstone, the upper Jurassic Bjorøy formation, a condition that had never been encountered during subsea tunnel construction before. Geological engineers stated that there was no known solution to overcoming the problem, and that if the contractor had blasted into the area, the tunnel would have been filled with sand and water within minutes.

On a meeting on 10 October, O. T. Blindheim, a geological consulting company, and Selmer presented three alternatives: continued injection of cement, recommended by Blindheim; freezing, recommended by Selmer because it was the cheapest, but would take more time; and use of a water-tight shield. A technical committee was established, and on 16 December they recommended the use of cement injection combined with a ring of drainage holes around the tunnel before blasting. The method was to be continually tested, and if it was insufficient, freezing could be used. As the tunnel advanced, the hole was to be continuously secured using carbon fibre-reinforced carbon gunite, self-boring bolts, steel ribs and full pouring. Work was taken up after a meeting on 27 March 1995, and on 16 August the final blast was made. Representatives from Selmer stated that the method they had chosen had resulted in international interest for the tunnel, and they had demonstrated it to several international delegations.

=== Tolls and auxiliary roads ===
The grants were only given for the tunnel to Bjorøyna, and not for the necessary roads that would connect Tyssøy to Bjorøy. This caused local controversy, as some people on Bjorøy disagreed that the tolls on the Bjorøy Tunnel should pay for the Tyssøy Bridge. On 13 May 1993, the costs of the connection to Tyssøy were estimated at NOK 5 million. The issue was not resolved when the construction of the tunnel started. The original costs for the bridge were for NOK 11.4 million, including a 20-metre-long (66 ft) bridge with a clearance of 10 meters (33 ft). This was later reduced to 10 metres (33 ft) length and 5 meters (16 ft), which reduced the costs to NOK 9.4 million. Of this, the county paid NOK 4 million, while the two municipalities had advanced the transporting earthwork from the tunnel to the sound. On 22 January 1996, the tunnel company agreed to advance the construction costs and collect it from the tolls, with Sund Municipality guaranteeing for the debt.

On 2 February 1996, the tunnel company had an agreement with Bru og Tunnelskelskapet, which operates the Bergen Toll Ring, to collect the tolls in the tunnel using the Autopass automatic toll collection system. A manual collection system was estimated to cost NOK 1.4 million per year, while an automated system was estimated at NOK 0.4 million. The tunnel opened on 7 May 1996, the same day the last ferry ran. Originally the plan was to charge tolls similar to the ferry. With a manual system, it would not be possible to charge for two-wheeled vehicles and passengers, so the fares for other vehicles were raised slightly. In 1995, it had cost NOK 44 for a single passing with a car on the ferry. The tolls were set to NOK 120 for all types of vehicles, except two-wheelers, and NOK 72 was charged per travel with pre-paid ticket books. Bus riders had to pay for two extra zones. The toll plaza was open a few hour each week to allow people to purchase discounted tickets.

The contract for the construction of the bridge to Tyssøy was announced on 20 August 1996, and was won by NCC Eeg-Henriksen Anlegg, who wanted NOK 8.5 million for the job. The link opened on 27 September 1997. In 2000, a public meeting was held in which it was proposed to reduce the rates and instead prolong the collection time, but this was rejected. In 1999, the Norwegian Public Roads Administration reported that the Bjorøy Tunnel had the cheapest administration costs per passing, at 7.32 kr, of all small toll companies. The tolls were removed on 29 January 2005, after eight years and eight months, almost half the stipulated time.

On 19 January 2004, the freight ship Rocknes ran aground on the unmarked underwater bank of Revskolt in Vatlestraumen, located above the tunnel. The accident cost 18 people their lives and was the most extensive and costly oil spill in Norwegian history. In an attempt to avoid similar incidents occurring again, the Norwegian Coastal Administration started in May 2012 to blast away the bank, increasing the depth from 9 to 14 meters (30 to 46 ft). This allows the sailing width though Vatlestraumen to increase by 250 meters (820 ft). The work required the tarp covering the tunnel to be removed, causing increased leaks in the tunnel during the work period. The project was highly controversial amongst the islanders and the plans were approved by only a single decisive vote in the municipal council. Islanders were especially concerned that the work might damage the tunnel. Calculations conducted by the Coastal Administration conclude that there is no chance of this occurring, as the blasting is taking place 65 meters (213 ft) above the tunnel.
