= Lerøyna =

Island in Vestland, Norway

Lerøyna Lerøy (unofficial)
- Interactive map of the island

Geography
- Location: Vestland, Norway
- Coordinates: 60.2346°N 5.1782°E
- Area: 1.9 km^{2} (0.73 sq mi)
- Length: 2.3 km (1.43 mi)
- Width: 1.6 km (0.99 mi)
- Highest elevation: 50 m (160 ft)
- Highest point: Åsen

Administration
- Norway
- County: Vestland
- Municipality: Øygarden Municipality

Demographics
- Population: 30

Lerøyna is an island in Øygarden Municipality in Vestland county, Norway. The 1.9-square-kilometre (470-acre) island lies at the south end of the Raunefjorden, between the mainland Bergen Peninsula and the large island of Sotra. The smaller island of Bjelkarøyna lies just northeast of Lerøyna.

The island has about 30 permanent residents and many vacation cabins. The island has no road bridge connection with the mainland or other islands, but there is a regular ferry route from Klokkarvik on Sotra, to Lerøyna, to Bjelkarøyna, and then to Hjellestad in Bergen on the mainland. Øygarden and Bergen municipalities have been making plans to build a road bridge connecting Lerøyna and Bjelkarøyna with a possible connection to the mainland.

== See also ==
- List of islands of Norway
