= Herman Sörgel =

German architect (1885–1952)

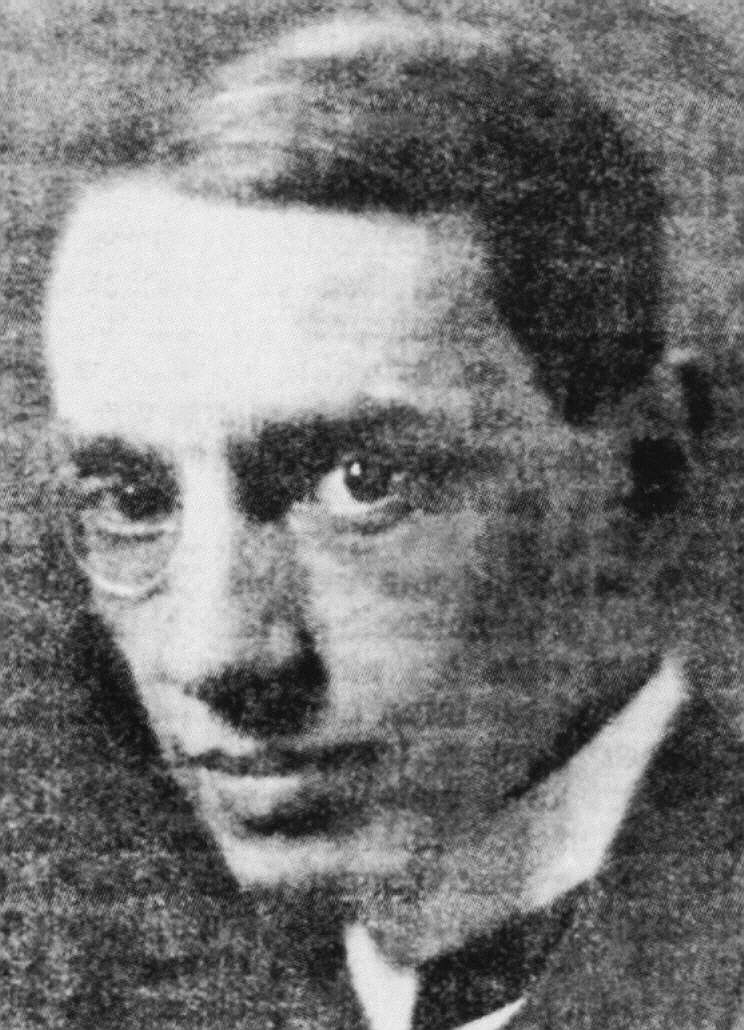
- Born: 2 April 1885; Regensburg, Bavaria, German Empire
- Died: 25 December 1952 (aged 67); Bavaria, West Germany
- Education: Technical University of Munich (Dipl.); TU Dresden (PhD)
- Occupation: Architect
- Known for: Atlantropa

Herman Sörgel (2 April 1885 – 25 December 1952) was a German architect. He was known for popularizing the Atlantropa project, a massive construction project which was conceived initially as a solution to Europe's economic and political problems during the early 20th century. Atlantropa included proposals for dams to be built across the Strait of Gibraltar, the Dardanelles, and between Sicily and Tunisia. The dams would provide hydroelectric power and would be managed by a newly formed independent body with the authority to discontinue energy to any country which threatened peace. Sörgel actively promoted his ideas until his death in 1952.

== Early life ==
Hans Otto Herman Sörgel was born in Regensburg, Bavaria, Germany, in 1885 to Johann Hans Ritter von Sörgel and Cäcilie Sörgel née Unterholzner. His father was a trained engineer who was involved in the construction of the Walchensee Hydroelectric Power Station. and for which he was given a personal enoblement and the right to add "von" to his last name. Sörgel's mother, Cäcilie, came from a family of brewers and property holders in Neuötting. Sörgel was raised Catholic, but would later in life become non-confessional.

=== Education ===
Sörgel attended the Maximiliansgymnasium in Munich, before graduating in 1904 after which he studied architecture at The Technical University in Munich from 1904 to 1908. While his PhD thesis was rejected in Munich, it was graded as "exceptional" by Fritz Schumacher at the TU Dresden. He would pass his exam to become a government architect in 1910.

== Career ==
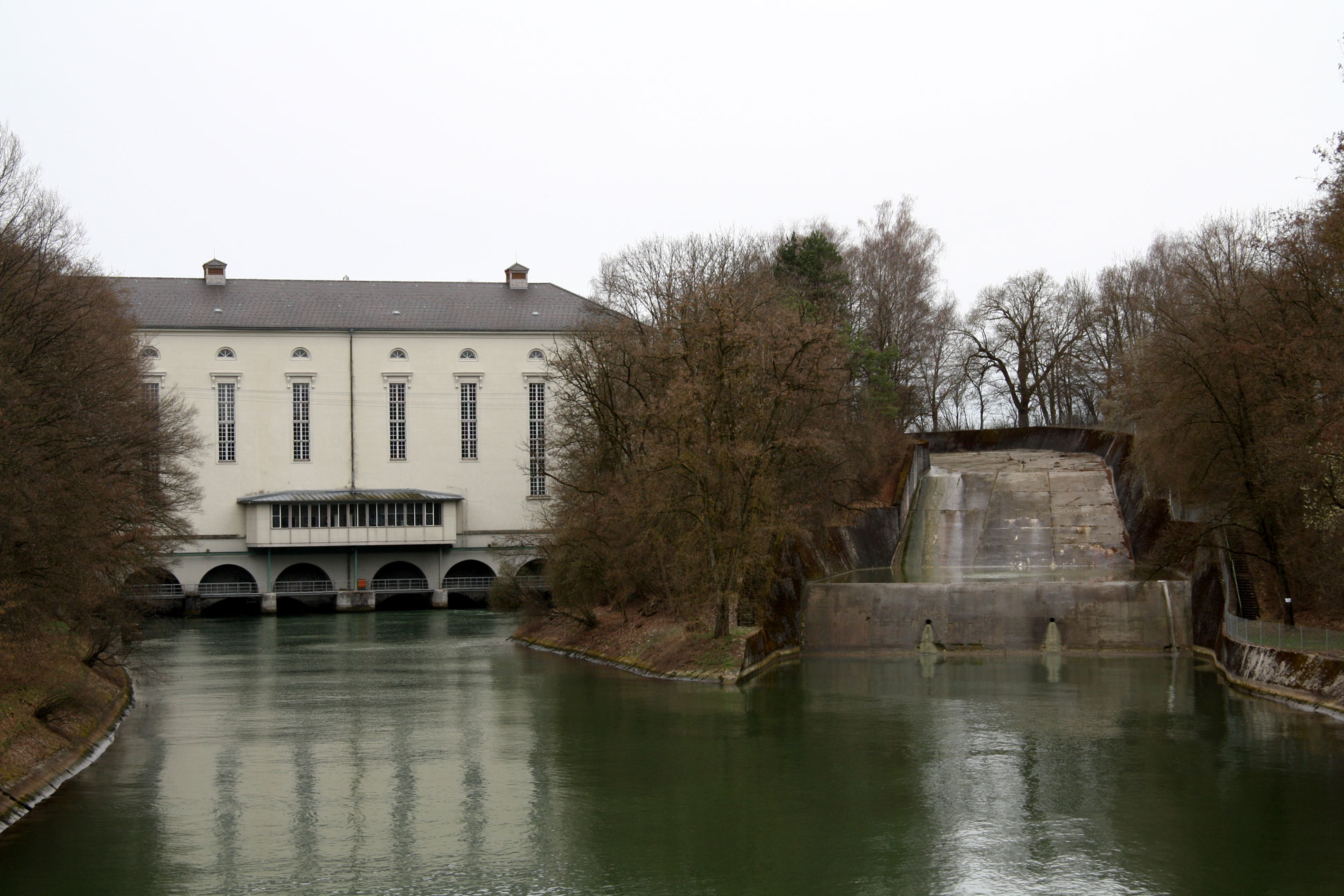
The power plant at Aufkirchen.

As an architect attached to the Bavarian Building Commission, Sörgel designed the building attached to the hydropower station in Aufkirchen on the river Isar. He also authored several books on architecture and worked as editor-in chief for the architectural journal Die Baukunst. Through his work at Baukunst he came into contact with many renowned architects such as Lloyd Wright whose home Taliesin he visited in 1926.

== Atlantropa ==
Sörgel had read the German translation of H. G. Wells' monumental work "The Outline of History", in which the author describes the Mediterranean Sea as a "lost Mediterranean Valley" before it was flooded. But it was not until 1927 when he read the geographer Otto Jessen's book Die Straße von Gibraltar (English: The Gibraltar Strait) wherein Jessen referred to the Mediterranean as an "evaporation sea", because of his belief that if the flow of water from the Atlantic Ocean through the strait would be blocked, then the sea would naturally evaporate. Sörgel found it plausible that such a thing could be done.

From this Sörgel originated the idea of Atlantropa—a utopian project which would include damming the Strait of Gibraltar, the Dardanelles, and the Congo River. The damming, and thus lowering, of the Mediterranean Sea would enable making use of the difference between the Mediterranean and the Atlantic sea levels to generate hydro-electric power. Sörgel's idea to lower sea levels would increase the dry land areas around the Mediterranean and provide overland access to Africa.

Damming the Congo River would have refilled the basin surrounding Lake Chad, providing fresh water to irrigate the Sahara, and shipping access to the African interior. Besides creating new bodies of land, the huge amounts of hydro-electric energy to be generated would account for 50% of Europe's energy needs at the time. While Sörgel was developing the idea, he never considered seriously how other countries would react or change. For example, the Levant would have increased in area by 50%. Atlantropa did have its supporters such as Erich Mendelsohn, who not only offered to provide designs for the project but also publicly advertised the project. Emil Fahrenkamp and Johann Friedrich Höger were also known to have offered to help design for Atlantropa.

== Personal life ==
Sörgel was first married to Babette Ritz in London in 1914. They divorced in 1921. In 1926, Sörgel was married to Irene Villányi (1894–1955) in London. Her father was a painter and Irene herself was a successful art dealer. Sörgel and his wife fled from Munich to Oberstdorf in 1943 to escape the bombing of the city. In 1950, they returned to Munich.

== Death ==
Sörgel died 25 December 1952 at the age of 67 soon after having been struck by a car while on his bicycle en route to a lecture at a German university in Munich. The accident happened on a road "as straight as a die" and the driver of the car was never found. Because of these circumstances some speculate that Sörgel was in fact murdered. Sörgel is buried at the Waldfriedhof cemetery in Munich.

== Publications ==
Some of his publications included:

- Sörgel, Herman (1929). Mittelmeer-Senkung. Sahara-Bewässerung = Lowering the Mediterranean, Irrigating the Sahara (Panropa Project), pamphlet. Leipzig: J.M. Gebhardt.
- Sörgel, Herman (1931). "Europa-Afrika: ein Weltteil". Sozialistische Monatshefte (37): 983–987.
- Sörgel, Herman (1932). Atlantropa. Munich: Fretz & Wasmuth, Zurich / Piloty & Löhle.
- Sörgel, Herman (1933). Foreword to "Technokratie - die neue Heilslehre" by Wayne W. Parrish. Munich: R. Piper & Co.
- Sörgel, Herman (1938). Die drei großen "A". Großdeutschland und italienisches Imperium, die Pfeiler Atlantropas. [Amerika, Atlantropa, Asien]. Munich: Piloty & Loehle.
- Sörgel, Herman (1942). Atlantropa-ABC: Kraft, Raum, Brot. Erläuterungen zum Atlantropa-Projekt. Leipzig: Arnd.
- Sörgel, Herman (1948). Foreword to "Atlantropa. Wesenszüge eines Projekts" by John Knittel. Stuttgart: Behrendt.

== See also ==
- François Élie Roudaire
