= Klokkarvik =

Village in Øygarden Municipality, Norway

- Village
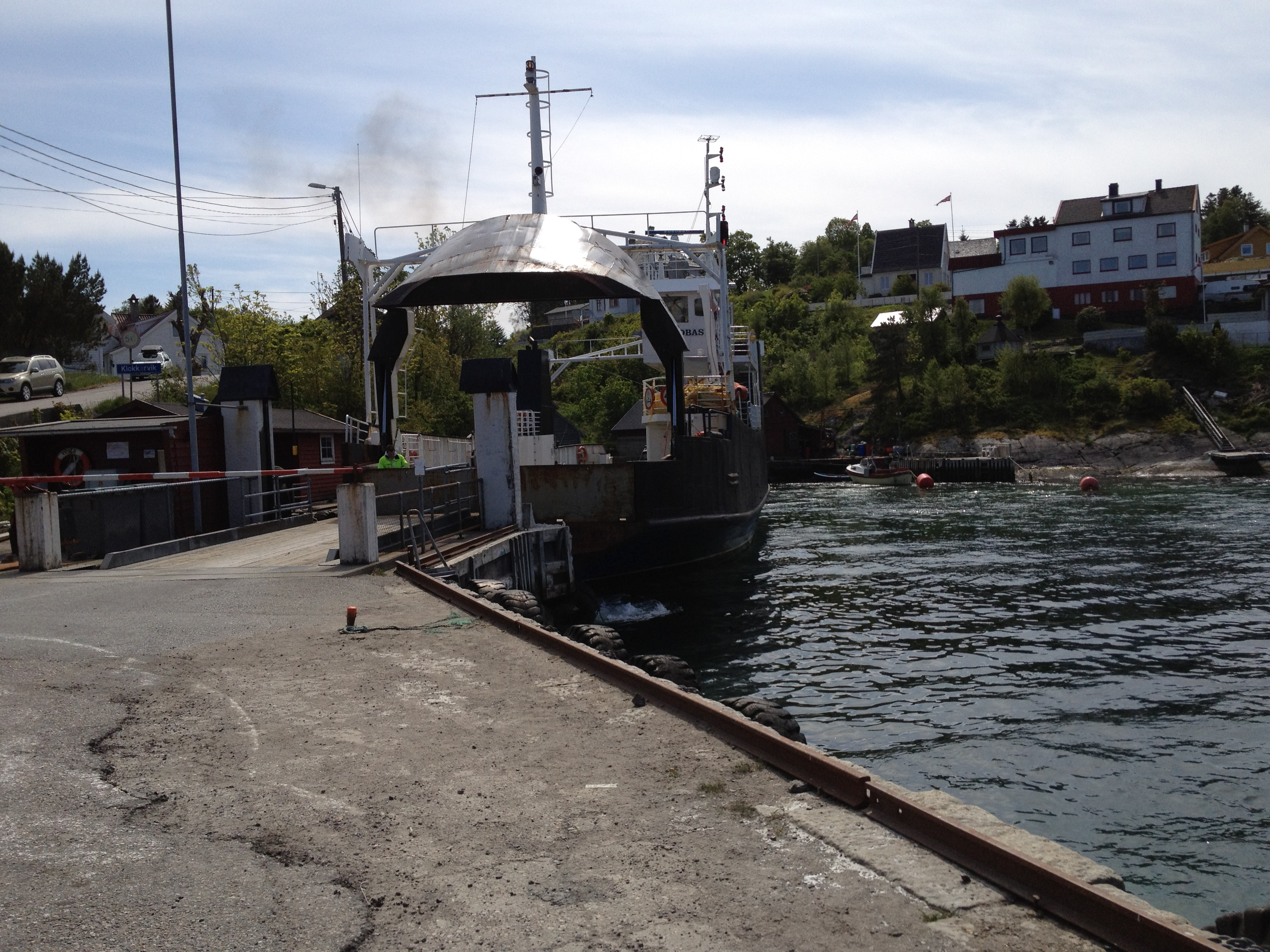
- View of the village's ferry quay
- Interactive map of Klokkarvik
- Coordinates: 60.22363°N 5.15197°E
- Country: Norway
- Region: Western Norway
- County: Vestland
- District: Midhordland
- Municipality: Øygarden Municipality

Area
  - Total: 0.67 km^{2} (0.26 sq mi)
- Elevation: 41 m (135 ft)

Population (2025)
  - Total: 755
  - Density: 1,127/km^{2} (2,920/sq mi)
- Time zone: UTC+01:00 (CET)
  - Summer (DST): UTC+02:00 (CEST)
- Post Code: 5378 Klokkarvik

Klokkarvik is a village in Øygarden Municipality in Vestland county, Norway. The village is located on the southeastern part of the island of Sotra, approximately 40 minutes outside the city of Bergen. It lies along the coast of Sotra, at the confluence of the Raunefjorden, Fanafjorden, and Krossfjorden. The islands of Lerøyna and Bjelkarøyna lie just east off the coast of Klokkarvik.

The 0.67-square-kilometre (170-acre) village has a population (2025) of 755 and a population density of 1,127 inhabitants per square kilometre (2,920/sq mi). Sund Church, built in a fan-shaped design in 1997, is located in Klokkarvik.
