= Bjorøyna =

Island in Vestland, Norway

Bjorøyna Bjørøyna (unofficial)
- Interactive map of the island

Geography
- Location: Vestland, Norway
- Coordinates: 60.3140°N 5.1742°E
- Area: 4.1 km^{2} (1.6 sq mi)

Administration
- Norway
- County: Vestland
- Municipality: Øygarden Municipality

Demographics
- Population: 1186 (2023)

Bjorøyna is an island in Øygarden Municipality in Vestland county, Norway. The 4.1-square-kilometre (1.6 sq mi) island is located south of the island of Litlesotra, west of the Bergen Peninsula, north of the island of Tyssøyna, and east of the island of Sotra.

Bjorøyna is connected to the mainland city of Bergen by a subsea road tunnel called the Bjorøy Tunnel. Bjorøyna is also connected to the small island of Tyssøyna by a bridge. Bjorøyna has 1,186 inhabitants (in 2023), and several hundred vacation cabins. /

== History ==
Due to its favourable location, proximity to Bergen, and the construction of the tunnel, the island has in recent years seen strong population growth. To prevent uncontrolled development, a building ban was instituted in 2007 but was later removed. The ban was instituted after a non-legally binding cap that only allowed ten new houses to be built on the island per year. The purpose was to ensure that the population growth did not surpass the growth of drinking water availability and kindergarten capacity (among other things), but the cap proved to be ineffective.

== Geography ==
Map of Bjorøy and its surroundings.

Bjorøyna is located in the Raunefjorden between the island of Sotra and the city of Bergen. Although Bjorøyna is connected only to Bergen Municipality by road, the island is part of Øygarden Municipality. To get to the rest of the municipality, Bjorøyna's residents must drive north into Bergen, then west over a bridge to get back to Øygarden Municipality. To the south of Bjorøyna is the smaller island of Tyssøyna. Tyssøyna is connected to Bjorøyna by a bridge which is in turn connected to Bergen by the Bjorøy Tunnel.

== Transport ==
The subsea Bjorøy Tunnel was opened in 1996, replacing the ferry between the island and Alvøen in Bergen. Plans for a tunnel connecting Bjorøyna with Bergen were presented in the late 1980s. By the early 1990s, the island's population had been decreasing for several years, and the sole grocery store on the island closed in 1991. In 1993, the Norwegian government approved the plans for the tunnel, and construction began the same year. The construction of the tunnel proved challenging: the bedrock quality was worse than anticipated. Delayed by almost a year, the tunnel finally opened on 7 May 1996.
