= Atlantropa =

Proposed engineering project to create new land within the Mediterranean Sea

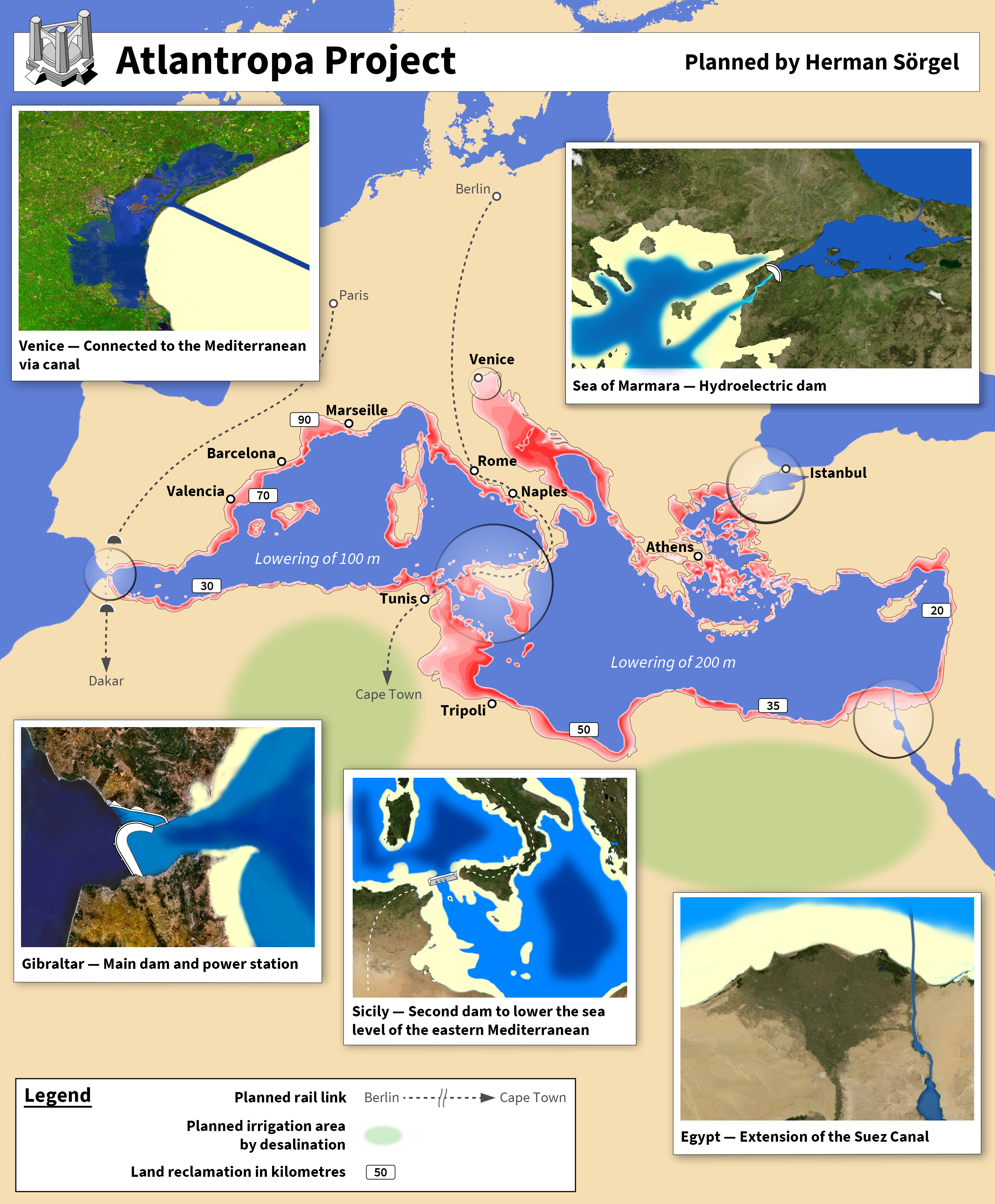
An outline map of the various hydroelectricity and land reclamation projects combined in Atlantropa

Atlantropa, also referred to as Panropa, was a gigantic engineering and colonisation idea that German architect Herman Sörgel devised in the 1920s, and promoted until his death in 1952. The proposal included several hydroelectric dams at key points on the Mediterranean Sea, such as the Strait of Gibraltar and the Bosporus, to cause a sea level drop and reclaim land.

== Design ==
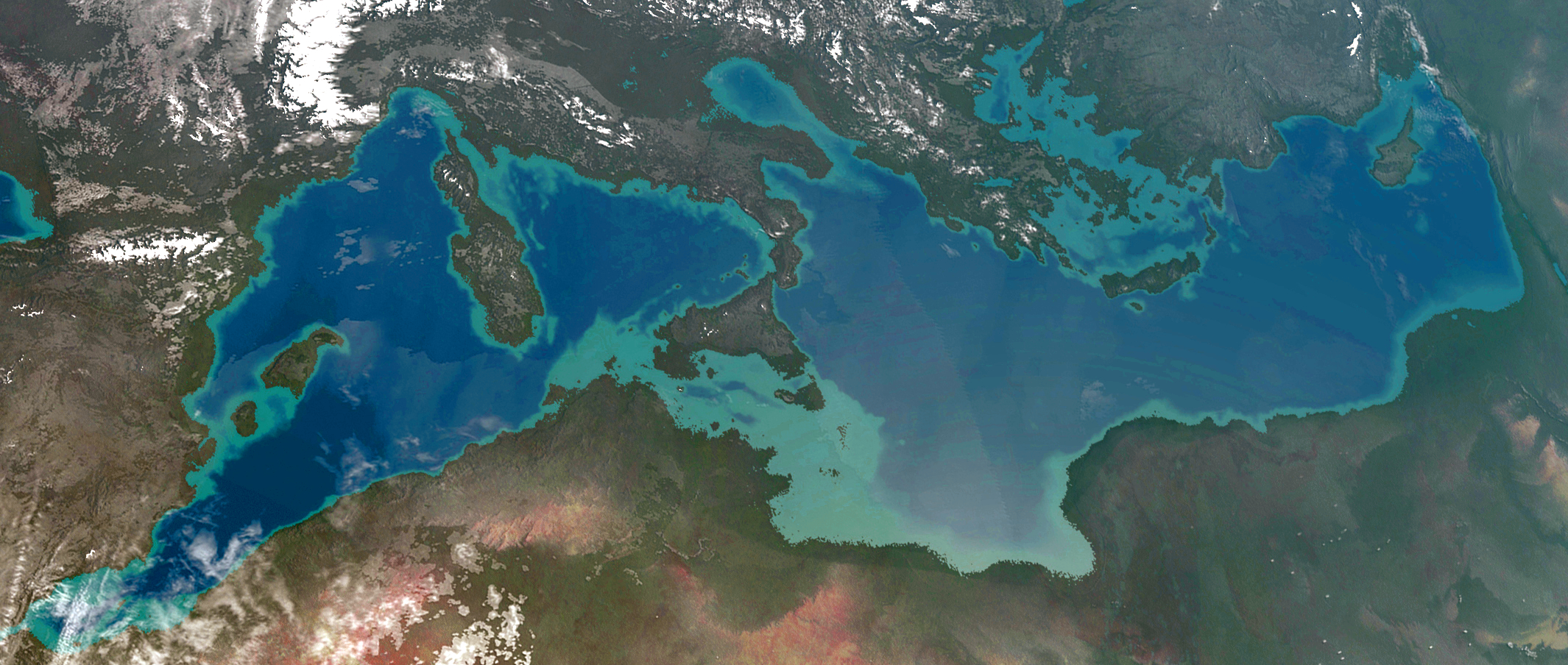
An artist's conception of what Atlantropa might have looked like as seen from space

The central feature of the Atlantropa proposal was to build a hydroelectric dam across the Strait of Gibraltar, which would have generated enormous amounts of hydroelectricity and would have led to the lowering of the surface of the Mediterranean Sea by as much as 200 metres (660 ft), opening up large new areas of land for settlement, such as in the Adriatic Sea. Four other major dams were also proposed:

- Across the Dardanelles to hold back the Black Sea
- Between Sicily and Tunisia to provide a roadway and to lower the inner Mediterranean further
- On the Congo River below its Kasai River tributary, to refill the Chad Basin around Lake Chad, provide fresh water to irrigate the Sahara, and create a shipping lane to the interior of Africa
- Extending the Suez Canal and locks to maintain connection with the Red Sea

Sörgel saw his scheme, which was projected to take more than a century, as a way of providing land, food, employment and electric power, as well as creating a new vision for Europe and neighbouring Africa. The Atlantropa proposal, throughout its several decades, was characterised by four constants:

- Pacifism, in its promises of using technology peacefully
- Pan-European sentiment, seeing the project as a way to unite a war-torn Europe
- Eurocentric attitudes to Africa, which was to become united with Europe into "Atlantropa" or Eurafrica
- Neocolonial geopolitics, which saw the world divided into three blocs: America, Asia and Atlantropa.

Active support was limited to architects and planners from Germany and a number of other primarily Northern European countries. Critics derided it for various faults, including the lack of any co-operation of Mediterranean countries in the planning, and the impacts that it would have on coastal communities that would be stranded inland when the sea receded. The proposal reached great popularity in the late 1920s and early 1930s, and again briefly in the late 1940s and early 1950s, but after Sörgel's death it disappeared from general discourse.

== History ==
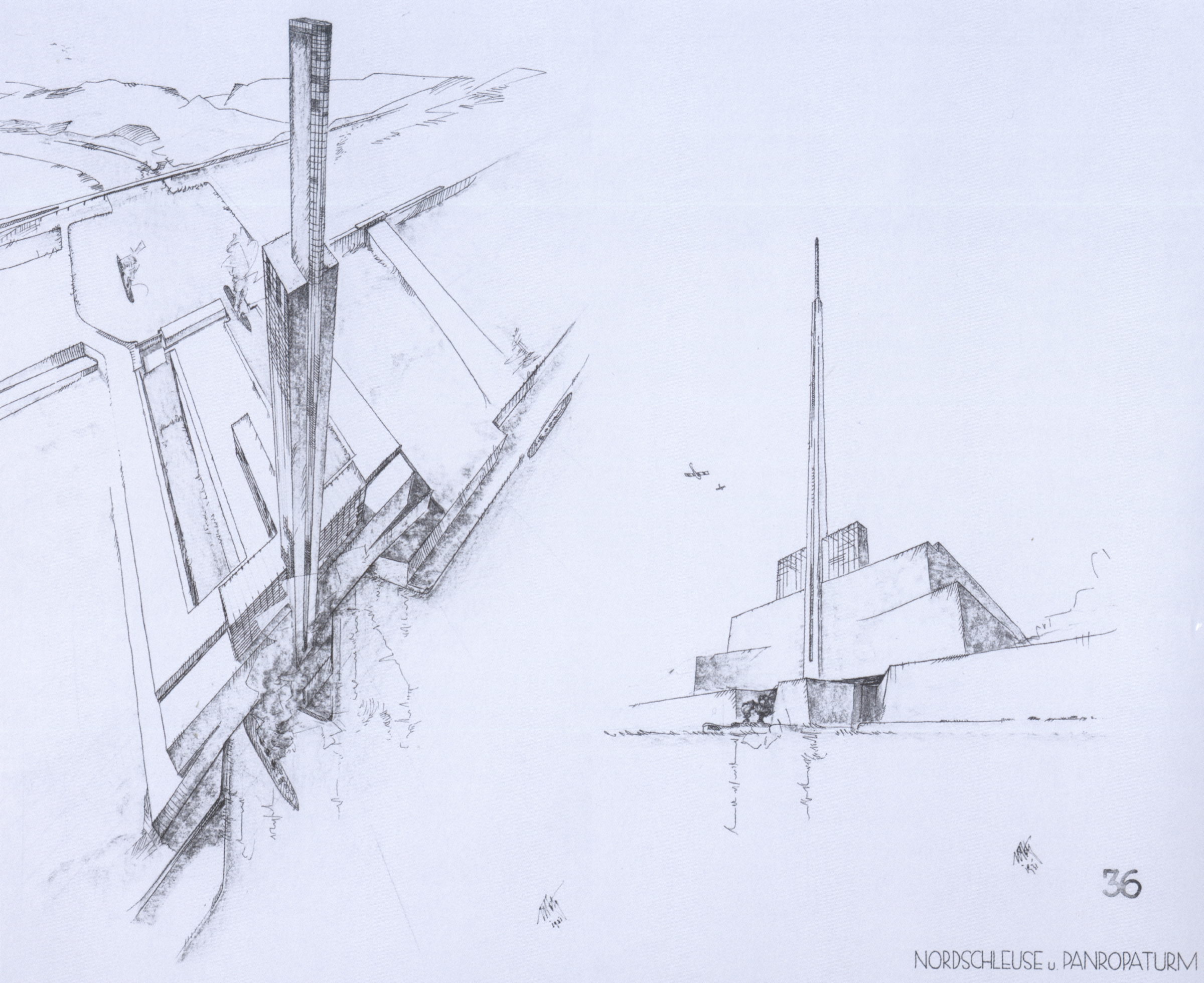
Sörgel's proposed new locks at the Gibraltar Dam

Sörgel's utopian goal was to solve all the major problems of European civilization by the creation of a new continent, "Atlantropa", consisting of Europe and Africa, to be inhabited by Europeans. Sörgel was convinced that to remain competitive with the Americas and an emerging Oriental "Pan-Asia", Europe needed to become self-sufficient, which in his opinion meant possessing territories in all climate zones. In Sörgel's opinion, Asia would forever remain a mystery to Europeans, and the British would not be able to maintain their global empire in the long run, and so he advocated a common European effort to colonize Africa.

The lowering of the Mediterranean would have enabled the production of immense amounts of electric power, guaranteeing the growth of industry. Unlike fossil fuels, the power source would not be subject to depletion. Vast tracts of land would have been freed for agriculture, including the Sahara, which was to be irrigated with the help of three sea-sized manmade lakes in Africa.

The massive public works, envisioned to go on for more than a century, were to relieve unemployment, and the acquisition of new land to ease the pressure of overpopulation, which Sörgel thought were the fundamental causes of political unrest in Europe. He also believed his proposal's effect on the climate could only be beneficial, and that the climate could be changed for the better as far away as the British Isles, as a more effective Gulf Stream would create warmer winters. The Middle East, under the control of a consolidated Atlantropa, was to be an additional energy source and a bulwark against the Yellow Peril.

The publicity material produced for Atlantropa by Sörgel and his supporters contain plans, maps and scale models of several dams and new ports on the Mediterranean, views of a Gibraltar dam crowned by a 400-metre (1,300 ft) tower designed by Peter Behrens, projections for growth of agricultural production, sketches for a pan-Atlantropan power grid, and even provision for the protection of Venice as a cultural landmark. Concerns about climate change or earthquakes, when mentioned, were framed as positives rather than negatives. Sörgel's 1938 book Die drei großen A has a quote from Hitler on the flyleaf to demonstrate that the concept was consistent with Nazi ideology.

After World War II, interest was piqued again as the Western Allies sought to create closer bonds with their colonies in Africa in an attempt to combat growing Marxist influence in that region, but the invention of nuclear power, the cost of rebuilding, and the end of colonialism left the Atlantropa proposal technologically unnecessary and politically unfeasible, although the Atlantropa Institute remained in existence until 1960. Most proposals to dam the Strait of Gibraltar since that time have focused on the hydroelectric potential of such a project and do not envisage any substantial lowering of the Mediterranean sea level. An idea involving a tensioned fabric dam stretched between Europe and North Africa in the Gibraltar Strait has been envisioned to cope with any future global sea level rise outside the Mediterranean Sea Basin.

== In popular culture ==
A version of the Atlantropa project was put forward by a character in Philip K. Dick's novel The Man in the High Castle and in the Amazon Studios series of the same name, by Martin Heusmann, who proposed to drain the entire Mediterranean Sea with a dam across the Strait of Gibraltar. Gene Roddenberry's novelization of Star Trek: The Motion Picture describes a dam at Gibraltar that has turned the Mediterranean into a "large lake" and increased agricultural land.

The 2018 alternate history novel The Atlantropa Articles by Cody Franklin (creator of the YouTube channel AlternateHistoryHub) takes place thousands of years after Nazi Germany fully implemented the project. However, rather than reveal fertile farmland, the entire Mediterranean evaporated to create a salt-covered desert (with the exception of a walled-in portion surrounding the city of Venice, now called "Maria"). This negatively impacted the global climate, rendering most of southern Europe and northern Africa uninhabitable. The novel's unpublished sequel, Savannah Runner, was to follow the descendants of climate refugees who settled in central Africa, along the large lakes and inland seas created by the water displaced by the dams.

== See also ==
- Aral Sea
- Reber Plan
- Imperialism
- Megaproject
- Northern European Enclosure Dam
- Qattara Depression Project
- Lake Chad replenishment project
- Red Sea Dam
- Strait of Gibraltar crossing
- Three Gorges Dam
- Trans Global Highway
