= Tyssøyna =

Island in Vestland, Norway

Tyssøyna Tyssøy (unofficial)
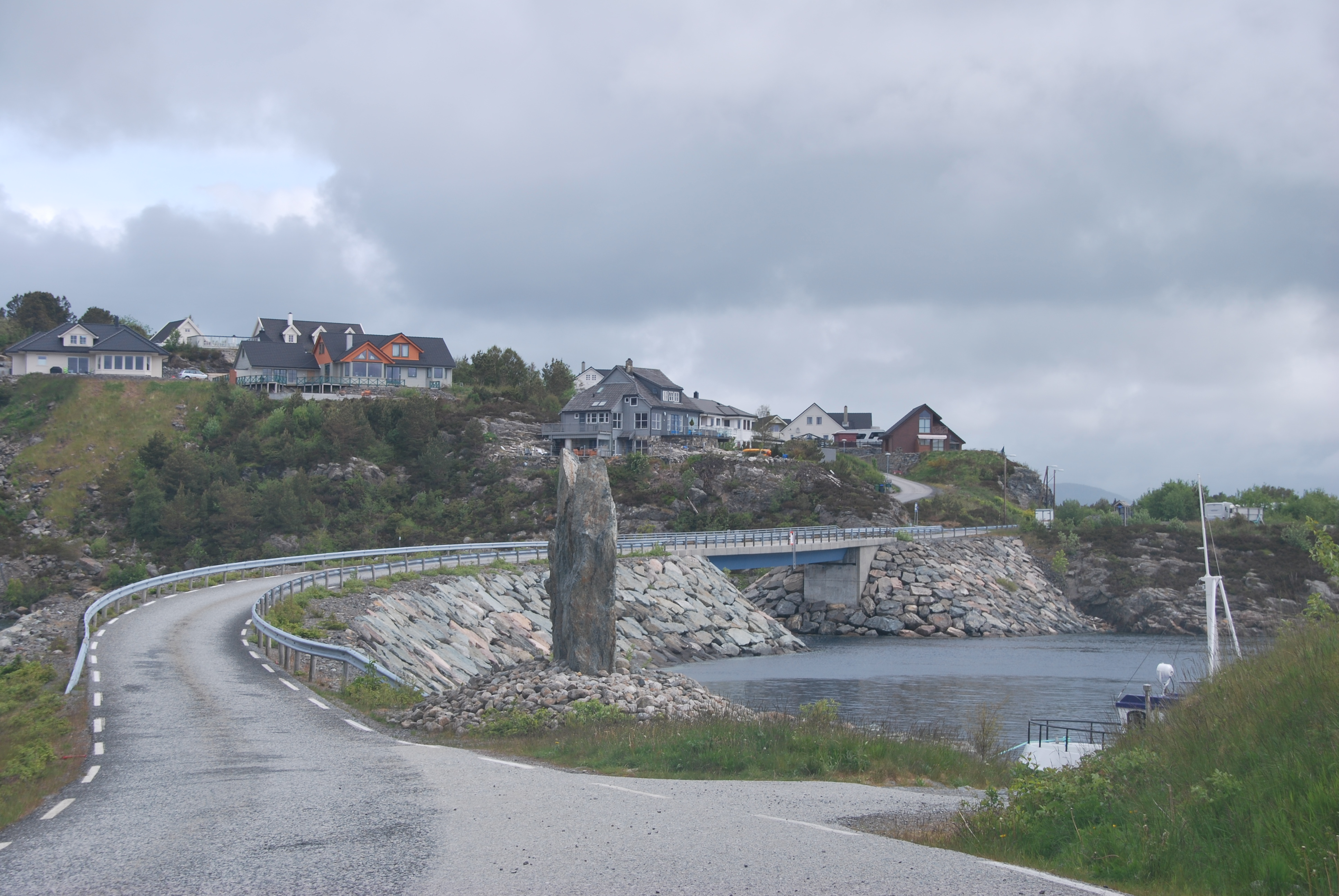
- View of the bridge connecting Tyssøy and Bjorøy
- Interactive map of the island

Geography
- Location: Vestland, Norway
- Coordinates: 60.2937°N 5.1584°E
- Area: 0.9 km^{2} (0.35 sq mi)
- Length: 1.6 km (0.99 mi)
- Width: 1 km (0.6 mi)
- Highest elevation: 80 m (260 ft)
- Highest point: Varden

Administration
- Norway
- County: Vestland
- Municipality: Øygarden Municipality

Demographics
- Population: 70 (2016)

Tyssøyna is an island in Øygarden Municipality in Vestland county, Norway. The 0.9-square-kilometre (220-acre) island lies in the northern part of the Raunefjorden. The island has a population of about 70 and is connected to the neighboring island of Bjorøyna to the north via a short bridge. Bjorøyna is connected to the mainland by the Bjorøy Tunnel.

== History ==
The island is named for the Norse god Týr. Also during the Middle Ages (ca. 1305), the Norwegian king Haakon V built a royal chapel on the island. Remains of the chapel are still visible at a site called "Kyrkjesteinane".

On the western side of the island is a wide and sheltered harbour called Tyssøyvågen. A narrow inlet leads into the harbour from the south, on the eastern side of the inlet several large soapstone rocks have tumbled down from the hillside. On one of these rocks a peculiar little "carving" is found. In the local community it is named "the crown" or "Tyssøykruna". Further inland on Tyssøy is a larger soapstone locality, bearing traces of being quarried for building material, most probably of a Medieval date. It seems likely that the quarrying activities at the two sites have taken place at the same time. This indicates that the earliest possible date for the figure at the inlet of Tyssøyvågen is the Middle Ages.

== Media gallery ==
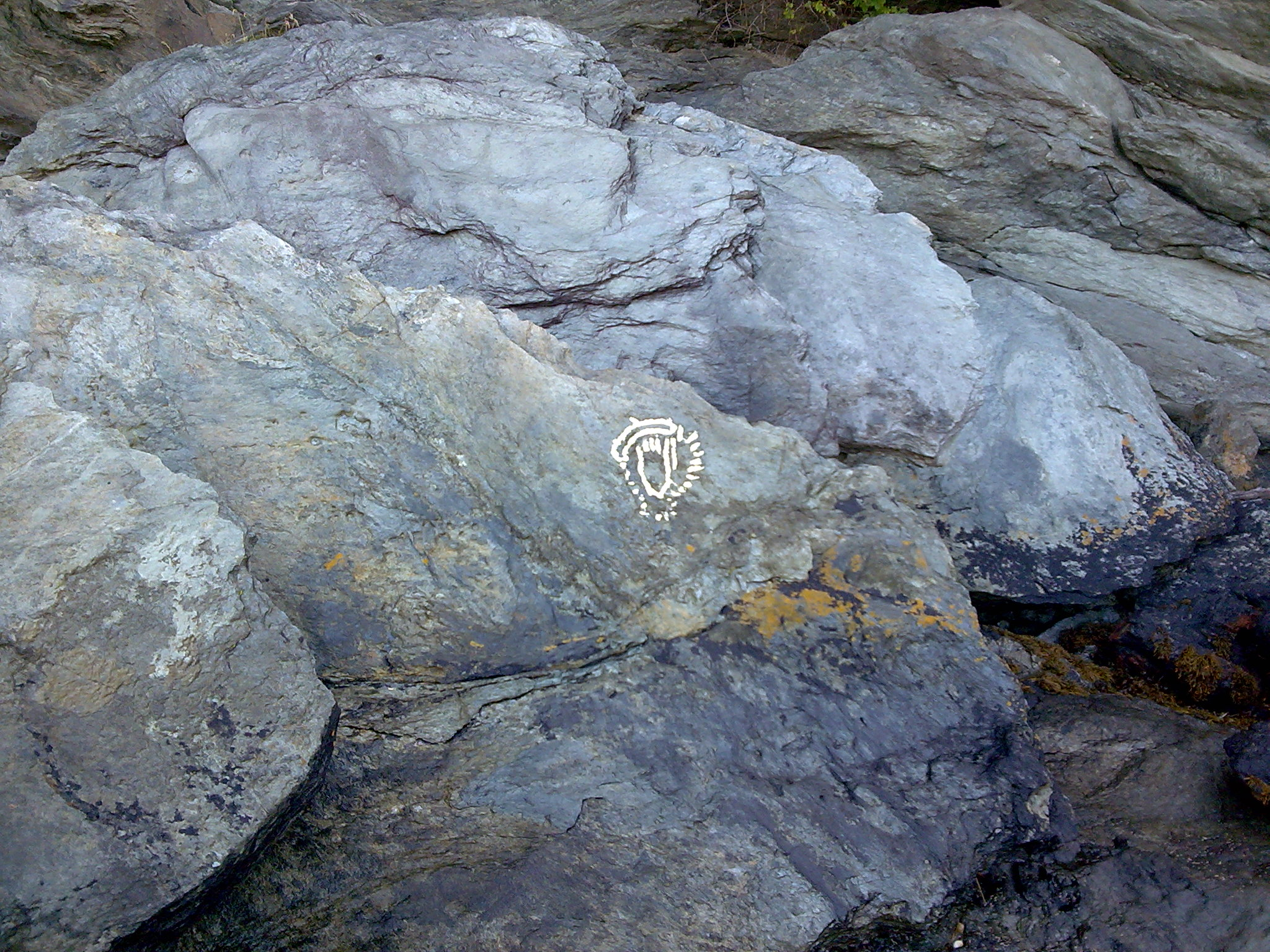
"Tyssøykruna". The "crown" is incised on the large flat slab in the centre of the picture. The site can only be reached by boat, but due to the white paint the figure is fully visible from the sea (photo by Nils-Arne Ekerhovd).

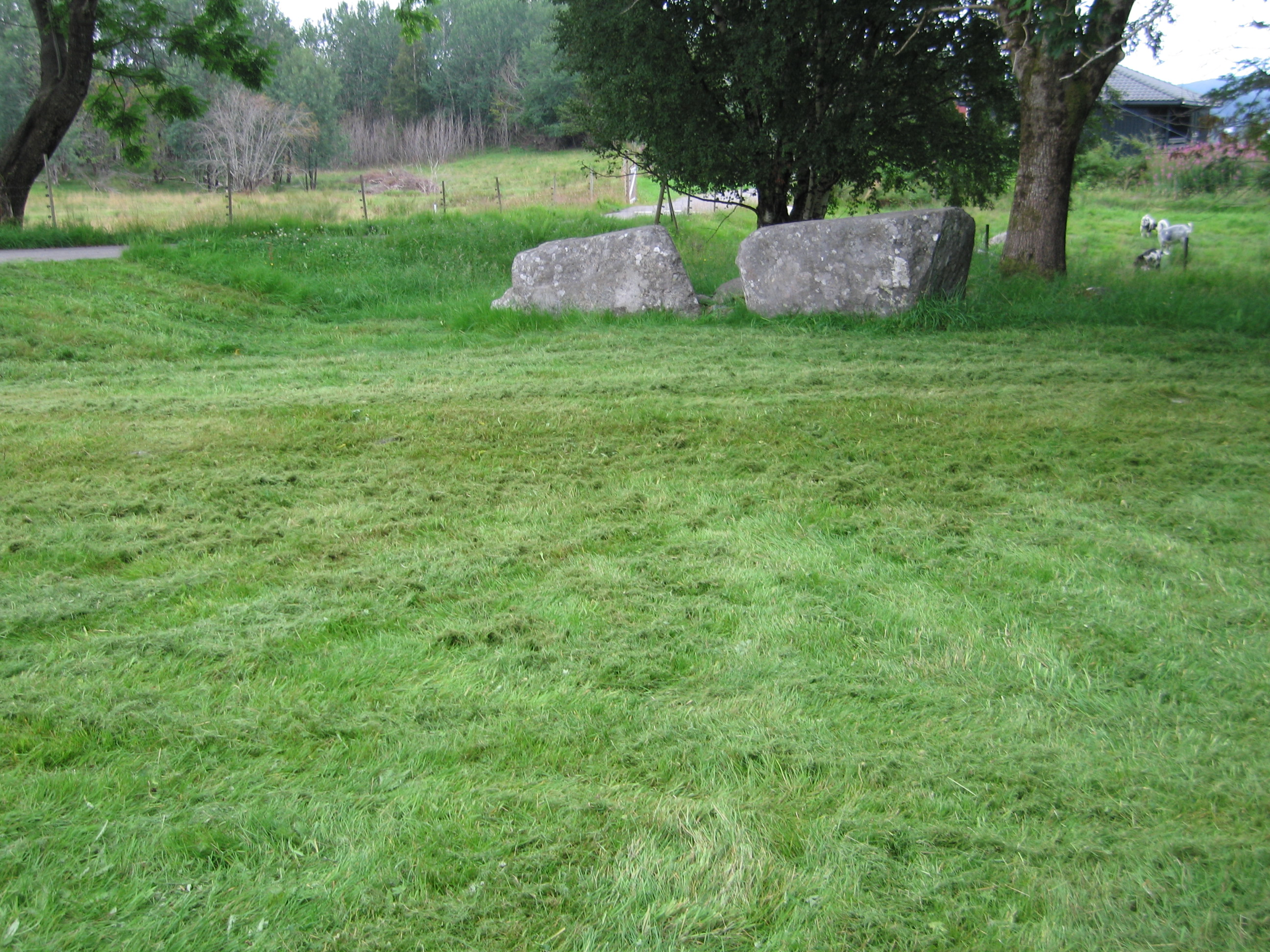
Kyrkjesteinane Tyssøyna (photo by Nils-Arne Ekerhovd).

== See also ==
- List of islands of Norway
