= Bergens Skillingsbank =

Norwegian bank

Bergens Skillingsbank was a Norwegian bank based in Bergen, Norway. It was established as a savings bank in 1857, but converted to a commercial bank in 1919. In 1993 it took over Norges Hypotekinstitutt. In 1997 it changed its name to Bergensbanken, the same year as the company upgraded its offices. In 1999 it was bought by Handelsbanken and amalgamated.
