= Bjelkarøyna =

Island in Vestland, Norway

Bjelkarøyna Bjelkarøy (unofficial)
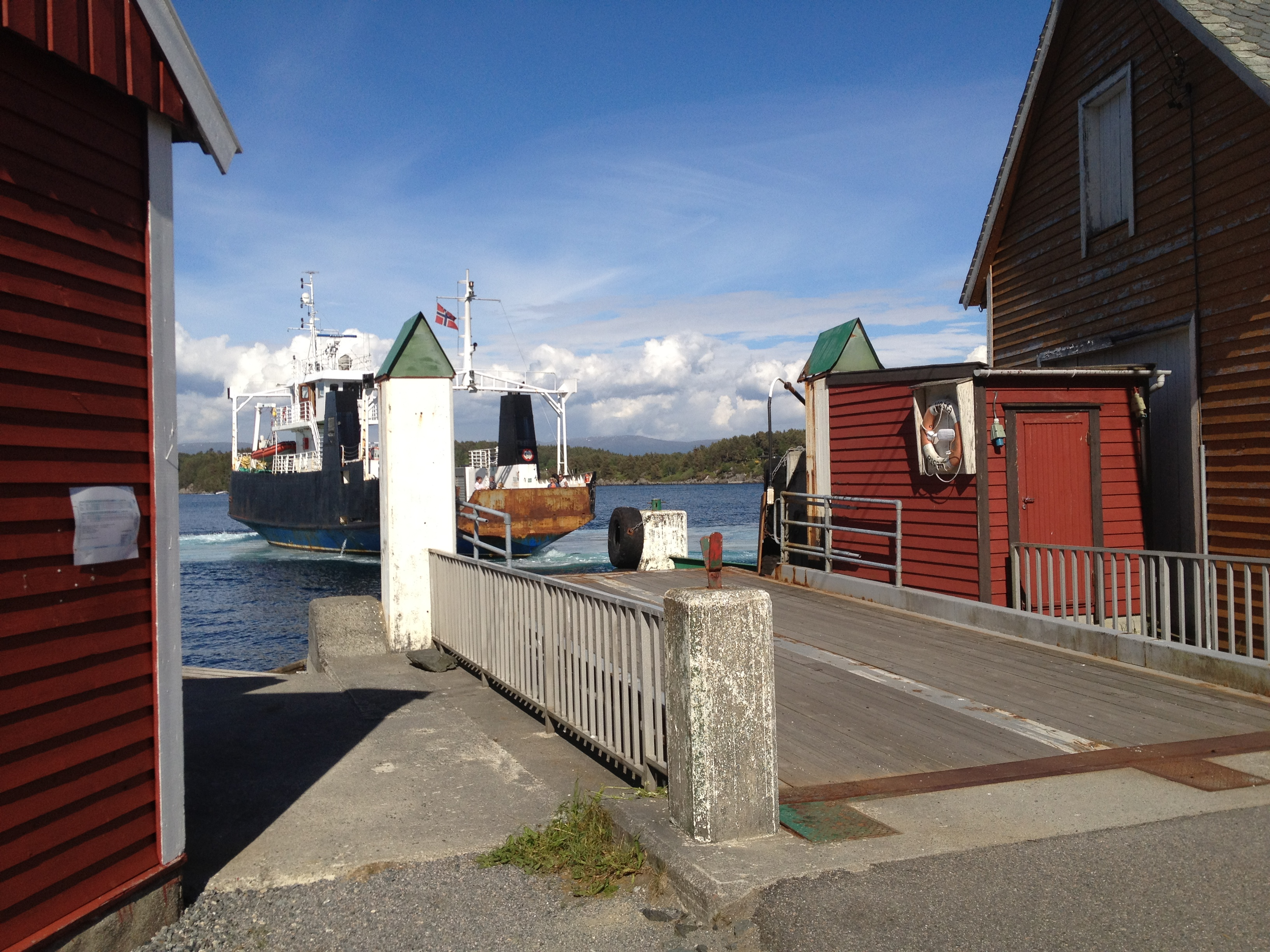
- View of the Bjelkarøy ferry quay
- Interactive map of the island

Geography
- Location: Vestland, Norway
- Coordinates: 60.2437°N 5.21372°E
- Area: 1.1 km^{2} (0.42 sq mi)
- Length: 1.9 km (1.18 mi)
- Width: 930 m (3050 ft)
- Highest elevation: 55 m (180 ft)

Administration
- Norway
- County: Vestland
- Municipality: Øygarden Municipality

Bjelkarøyna is an island in Øygarden Municipality in Vestland county, Norway. The 1.1-square-kilometre (270-acre) island lies in the southern part of the Raunefjorden between the mainland Bergen Peninsula and the large island of Sotra. The small island of Lerøyna lies just east of Bjelkarøyna and the city of Bergen is located just to the east on the mainland.

The island has a small number of permanent residents and many vacation cabins. There is no road connection off the island, but there is a regular ferry route from Klokkarvik on Sotra, to Lerøyna, to Bjelkarøyna, and then to Hjellestad in Bergen on the mainland. Øygarden and Bergen municipalities have been making plans to build a road bridge connecting Lerøyna and Bjelkarøyna with a possible connection to the mainland.

== See also ==
- List of islands of Norway
