= Hjellestad =

Neighborhood in Bergen, Norway

Coordinates: 60°15′23″N 5°13′25″E

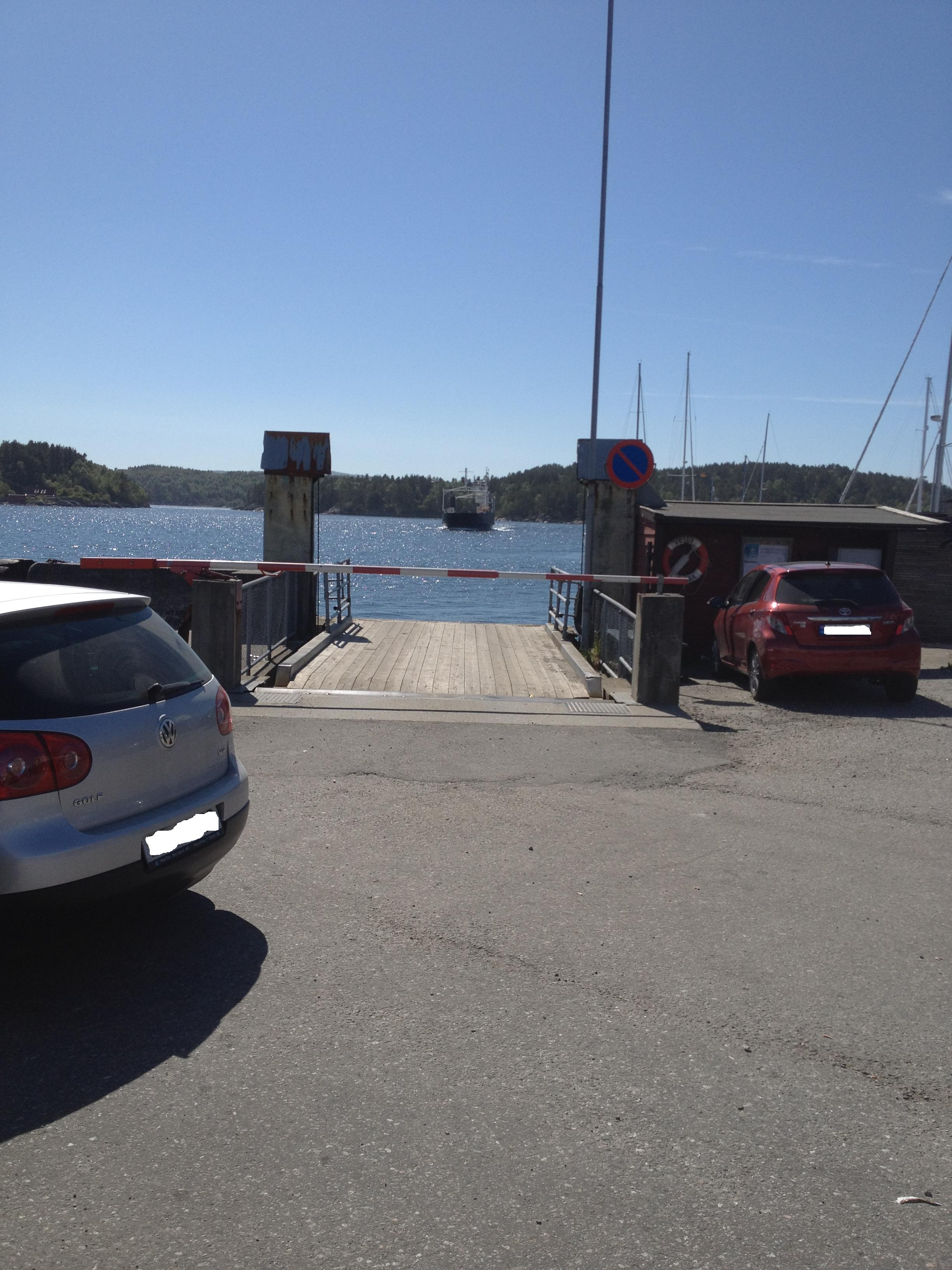
The ferry quay at Hjellestad

Hjellestad is a neighborhood of Bergen, Norway, situated in the borough of Ytrebygda. It is located on Mildehalvøyen, about 20 kilometers (12 mi) from the city center. From Hjellestad there is a ferry to Bjelkarøy, Lerøy and Klokkarvik. Bergen Airport, Hjellestad was situated there from 1948 to 1951.
