= Raunefjorden =

Strait in Vestland, Norway

- Location of the fjord Raunefjorden (Norway)
- Location: Vestland county, Norway
- Coordinates: 60.2736°N 5.1849°E
- Basin countries: Norway
- Max. length: 5.4 kilometres (3.4 mi)
- Max. width: 5.3 kilometres (3.3 mi)

Raunefjorden is a strait (even though it is called a fjord) in Vestland county, Norway. The wide strait flows between the mainland Bergen Peninsula and the island of Sotra. Bergen Municipality is located on the east side on the mainland and Øygarden Municipality to the west on Sotra. The strait is bounded to the north by the islands of Bjorøyna and Tyssøyna and on the south by the islands of Bjelkarøyna and Lerøyna.
