= Nygård, Norway =

Coordinates: 60°23′14″N 5°19′45″E

Nygård
- Neighbourhood
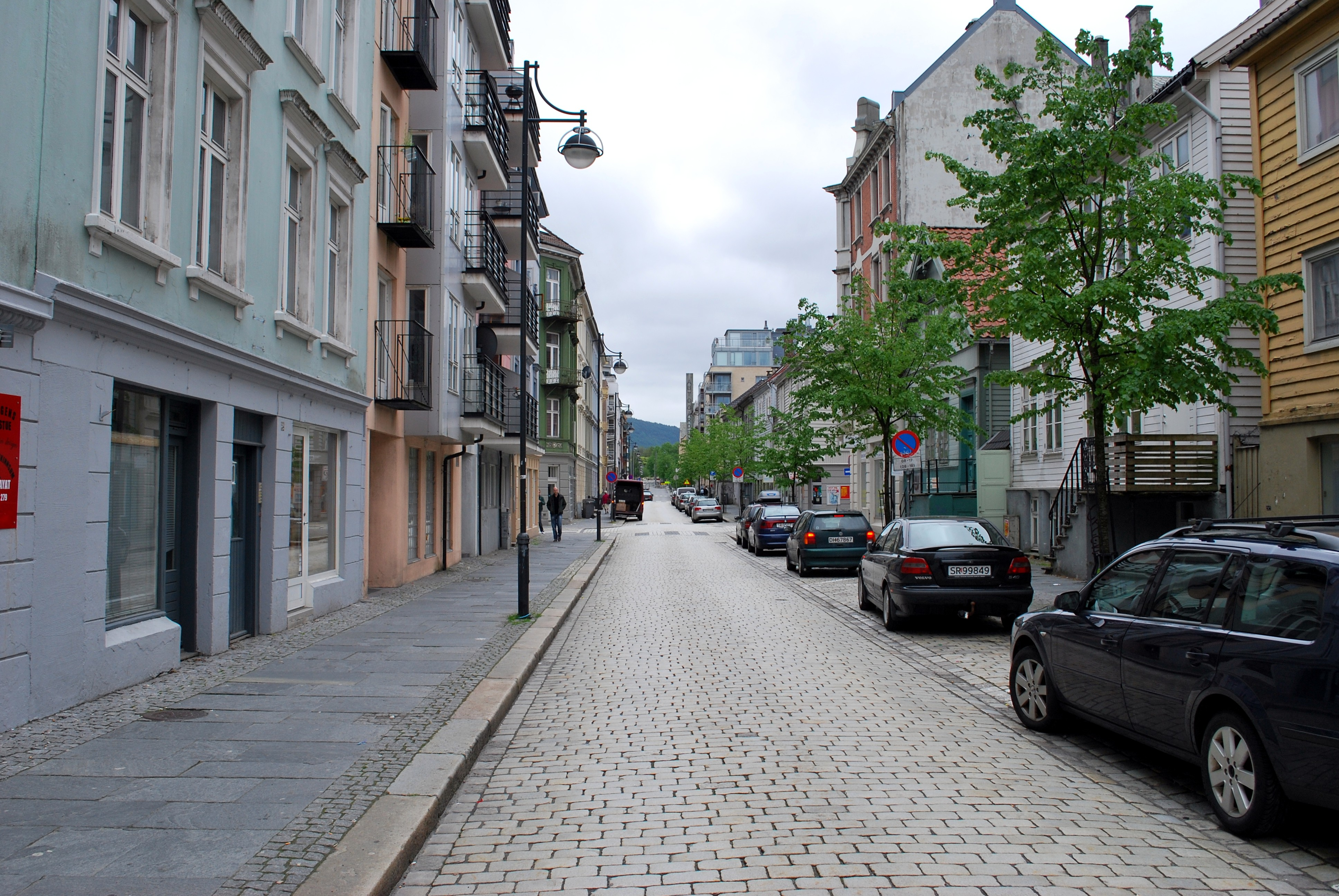
- Nygård
- Interactive map of Nygård
- Country: Norway
- County: Vestland
- District: Midhordland
- Municipality: Bergen
- Borough: Bergenhus

Area
  - Total: 0.46 km^{2} (0.18 sq mi)

Population (2010)
  - Total: 2,688
  - Density: 5,800/km^{2} (15,000/sq mi)
- As an unofficial area the population can't be fully determined
- Time zone: UTC+01:00 (CET)
  - Summer (DST): UTC+02:00 (CEST)

Nygård is a neighbourhood in the city centre of Bergen in Vestland county, Norway. It is located south of the Lille Lungegårdsvannet lake in the city centre and north of the Møhlenpris neighborhood. Grieghallen, St. Jacob's Church, and parts of the University of Bergen are located in Nygård.

== See also ==
- Nordnes
- Sydnes
- Verftet
- Møhlenpris
