= Sandviken Hospital =

- Bergen Hospital Trust
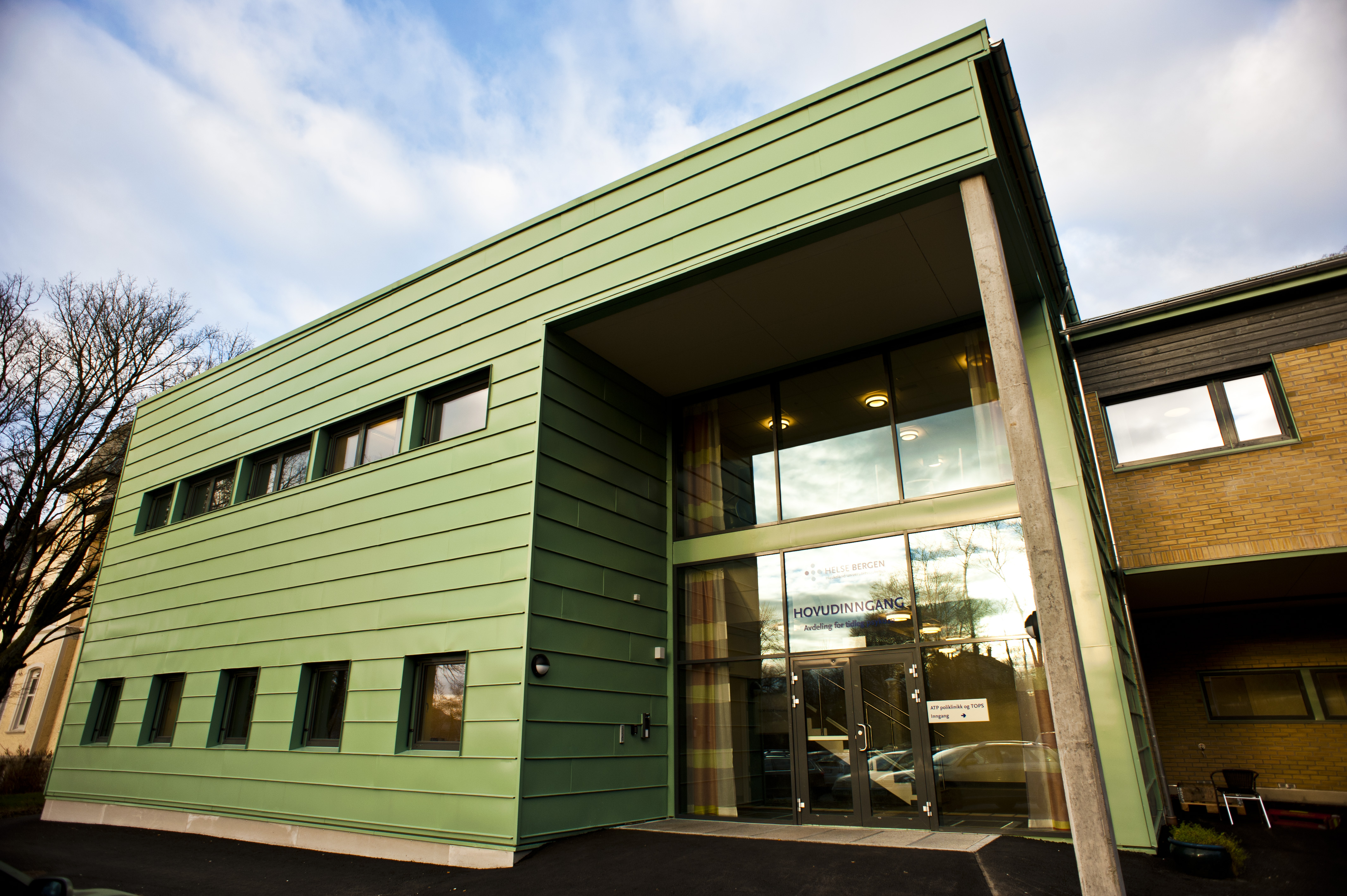

- Location in Norway

Geography
- Location: Sandviken, Bergen, Norway
- Coordinates: 60.418°N 5.314°E

Organisation
- Type: Psychriatric

Services
- Emergency department: Yes

Helipads
- Helipad: No

History
- Founded: 1891

Links
- Website: helse-bergen.no
- Lists: Hospitals in Norway

Sandviken Hospital (Norwegian: Sandviken sykehus) is a psychiatric hospital situated in the Sandviken neighborhood of Bergen, Norway. It is part of Bergen Hospital Trust, and is the only secure psychiatric unit within Western Norway Regional Health Authority.

== History ==
The hospital was established in 1891 as Neevengården Asylum (Neevengården asyl). It changed its name to Neevengården Hospital (Neevengården sykehus) in 1927, and took the current name in 1978. The hospital was constructed and owned by Bergen municipality, but was transferred to Hordaland county in 1972. It had place for 178 patients initially, but by 1955 reached a top of 518 patients. The hospital was in 2002 merged with the Psychiatric clinic of Haukeland University Hospital, and has since then been a part of the Bergen Hospital Trust and owned by the Norwegian state.

== Controversies ==
After a continuous reduction in the number of rooms/beds, the hospital has since the 2010s had hundreds of cases each year of patients being placed in hospital beds in the hallways.

The hospital has repeatedly received strong criticism from the Norwegian Parliamentary Ombudsman for its extensive use of isolation rooms.

In 2023 the Norwegian Board of Health Supervision found several legal and regulation offences at the hospital's emergency department.
