= Bergenhus =

Bergenhus bydel Sentrum
- Borough
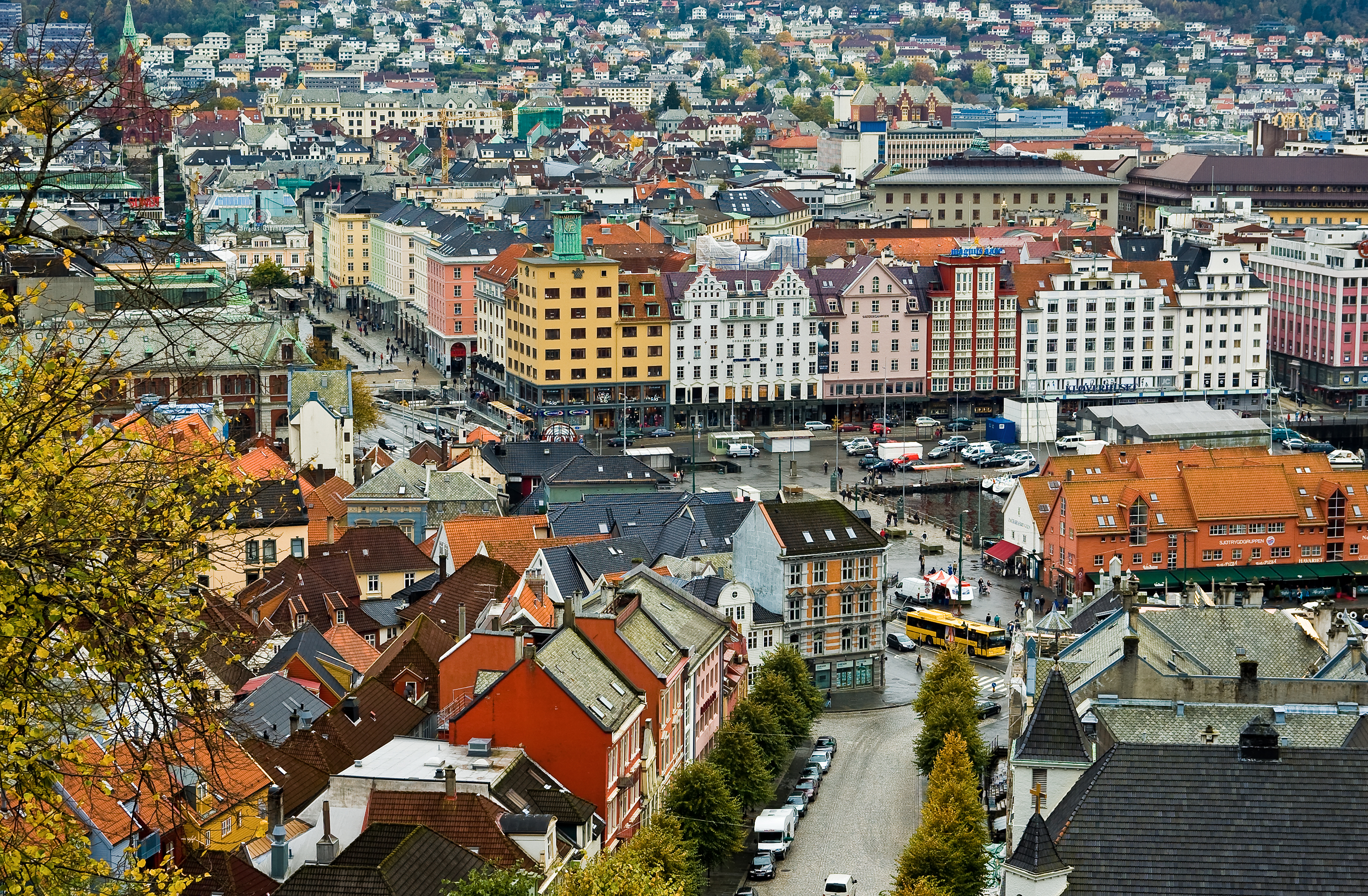

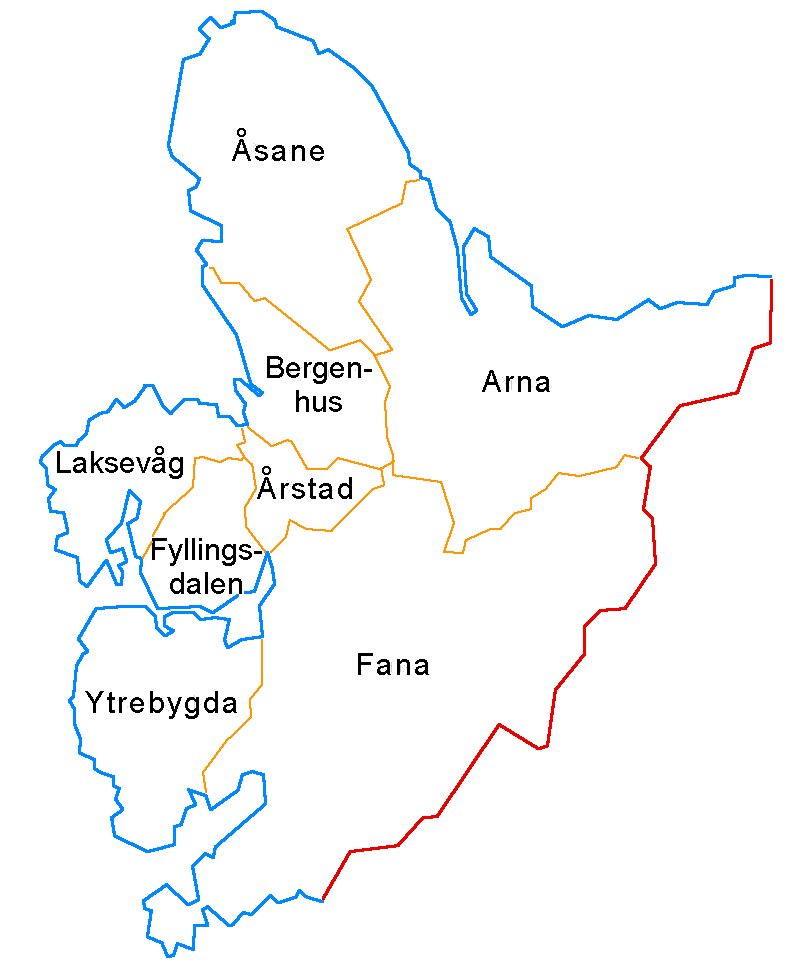
- Map of the 8 boroughs of Bergen
- Coordinates: 60°24′N 5°20′E
- Country: Norway
- Region: Western Norway
- County: Vestland
- District: Midhordland
- City: Bergen

Area
  - Total: 25.41 km^{2} (9.81 sq mi)
  - Rank: 6th
- 5.7% of total

Population (2014)
  - Total: 40,606
  - Rank: 2nd
  - Density: 1,598/km^{2} (4,139/sq mi)
- 14.9% of total
- Time zone: UTC+01:00 (CET)
  - Summer (DST): UTC+02:00 (CEST)
- ISO 3166 code: NO-120102

Bergenhus is a borough of the city of Bergen in Vestland county, Norway. This borough encompasses the city centre and is the most urbanized area of the whole city. The 25.41-square-kilometre (6,280-acre) borough has a population (2014) of 40,606. This gives Bergenhus a population density of 1,598 inhabitants per square kilometre (4,140/sq mi).

== Location ==
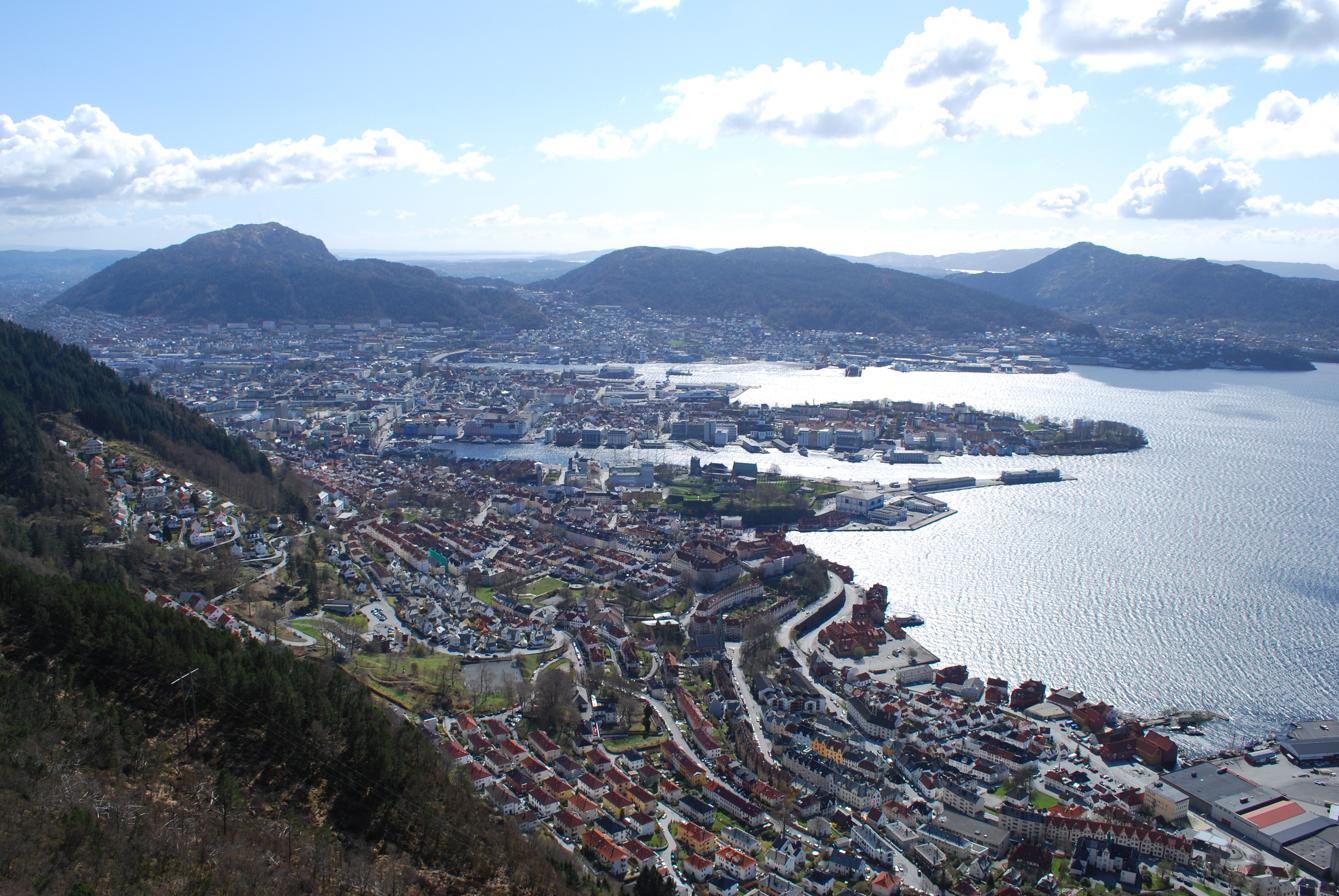
View of Bergenhus (foreground)

Named after the historic Bergenhus Fortress, Bergenhus makes up the city centre and the neighborhoods immediately surrounding it, including Sandviken and Kalfaret, as well as the mountains to the north and east of the city centre. It stretches from Haukeland University Hospital in the south to Lønborg in the north, and includes the entire mountainside and the peninsula bounded by the inlets of Store Lungegårdsvannet, Puddefjorden and Byfjorden that form the city's center.

Bergenhus is surrounded by the neighborhoods Åsane in the north, Arna in the east, Årstad to the south, Laksevåg to the west and by Askøy Municipality to the northwest.

The borough of Bergenhus includes the neighborhoods of Bryggen, Ladegården, Kalfaret, Møhlenpris, Nordnes, Sandviken, Solheimsviken, Sydnes, and Verftet. It is the site of some of the most historic buildings in Bergen including Bergenhus Fortress with Haakon's Hall and Rosenkrantz Tower. It is also the location of the University of Bergen, Bergen Cathedral, St. Mary's Church, and Holy Cross Church.

== Higher education ==
- Bergen School of Architecture
- Grieg Academy
- University of Bergen
- Norwegian School of Management
- Norwegian School of Economics

== Neighborhoods ==
The list of neighborhoods includes: Bontelabo, Bryggen, Eidemarken, Engen, Fjellet, Kalfaret, Ladegården, Marken, Møhlenpris, Nordnes, Nygård, Nøstet, Sandviken, Sentrum, Skansen, Skolten, Skuteviken, Strandsiden, Stølen, Sydnes, Verftet, Vågsbunnen, and Ytre Sandviken.

=== Sentrum ===
Sentrum (English: Centre) is a neighborhood (that lies within the boundaries of a former borough with the same name) that borders the neighborhoods Vågsbunnen, Strandsiden, Nøstet, Engen, Sydnes, Nygård and Marken.

The neighborhood lies around the main town square of Torgallmenningen and Lille Lungegårdsvann.

The boundaries of the neighborhood are the road Østre Muralmenning to the north; Strandgaten, Vågsalmenning, and Allehelgensgate to the east; Fredrik Motzfeldt's Street, Lille Lungerårdsvannet to Fossvinkels gate to St Paul Church, to Rosenbergsgaten, then to Vestre Torvgate, then to Vaskerelven, then down to Vaskerelvsmauet to Olav Vs plass, to Øvre Ole Bulls plass, to Veiten, to Markeveien, to Christian Michelsens gate, to Kalmargaten and Gartnergaten to Kjellersmauet, to Østre Muralmenning.

The neighborhood encompasses three 'grunnkrets': Strandkaien, Torgalmenningen, and Vaskerelven. These had 818 inhabitants in 2014.

== Monuments ==
Monuments include 'Den blå stein' (the blue stone) at Klosterhaugen, portraying Amalie Skram.

== Local attractions ==
Historical population
Year	Pop.	±%
1980	35,532	—
1990	29,850	−16.0%
2001	32,097	+7.5%
2011	38,544	+20.1%
Source: Statistics Norway.

- Bergenhus Fortress
- Haakon's Hall
- Rosenkrantz Tower
- Koengen
- Sverresborg Fortress (Bergenhus festning)
- St Mary's Church (Mariakirken)
- Bergen Cathedral (Bergen domkirke)
- St John's Church (Johanneskirken)
- Holy Cross Church (Korskirken)
- New Church (Nykirken)
- Sandvik Church (Sandvikskirken)
- Biskopshavn Church
