= Western Norway Regional Health Authority =

Norwegian regional health authority

Helse Vest RHF
- Type: State owned
- Industry: Healthcare
- Founded: 1 January 2002
- Headquarters: Stavanger, Norway
- Area served: Vestland; Rogaland
- Key people: Herlof Nilssen (CEO); Oddvard Nilsen (Chairman)
- Revenue: ▲NOK 26,342 million (2016)
- Net income: NOK +707 million (2016)
- Number of employees: 25,578 (2018)
- Parent: Norwegian Ministry of Health and Care Services
- Website: www.helse-vest.no

Western Norway Regional Health Authority (Norwegian: Helse Vest RHF) is a state-owned regional health authority responsible for operating the hospitals in the counties of Rogaland and Vestland in Norway. Based in Stavanger the authority operates five health trusts that operate nine hospitals. It is led by chairman Oddvard Nilsen (Conservative) and CEO Herlof Nilssen.

Other central agencies include Helse Vest IKT that operates the information technology systems. Haukeland University Hospital cooperates with the University of Bergen to provide medical education in Bergen.

== Subsidiaries ==
- Stavanger Health Trust
  - Stavanger Hospital
- Bergen Health Trust
  - Haukeland University Hospital
  - Voss Hospital
  - Sandviken Hospital
- Fonna Health Trust
  - Haugesund Hospital
  - Odda Hospital
  - Stord Hospital
  - Valen Hospital
- Førde Health Trust
  - Førde Hospital
  - Lærdal Hospital
  - Nordfjord Hospital
- Western Norway Pharmaceutical Trust
