= Fonna Hospital Trust =

Norwegian health trust

Helse Fonna HF
- Company type: State owned
- Industry: Healthcare
- Founded: January 1, 2002
- Headquarters: Haugesund, Norway
- Area served: Haugalandet; Sunnhordaland
- Key people: Olav Klausen (CEO); Kjell Arvid Svendsen (Chairman)
- Revenue: ▲NOK 3,418 million (2016)
- Net income: NOK +54 million (2016)
- Number of employees: 3333 (2019)
- Parent: Norwegian Ministry of Health and Care Services
- Website: www.helse-fonna.no

Fonna Hospital Trust (Norwegian: Helse Fonna) is a health trust which administrates hospitals and institutions in Haugaland, Sunnhordland and parts of Hardanger. Fonna Health Trust is one of five local health trusts owned by Western Norway Regional Health Authority. The trust has over 3333 employees as of 2019.

== Hospitals and institutions ==
- Haugesund Hospital
- Stord Hospital
- Odda Hospital
- Valen Hospital
- Haugaland DPS
- Karmøy DPS
- Folgefonn DPS
- Avdeling Sauda
- Stord DPS
