= Kalfaret =

Coordinates: 60°23′14″N 5°20′38″E

- Neighbourhood
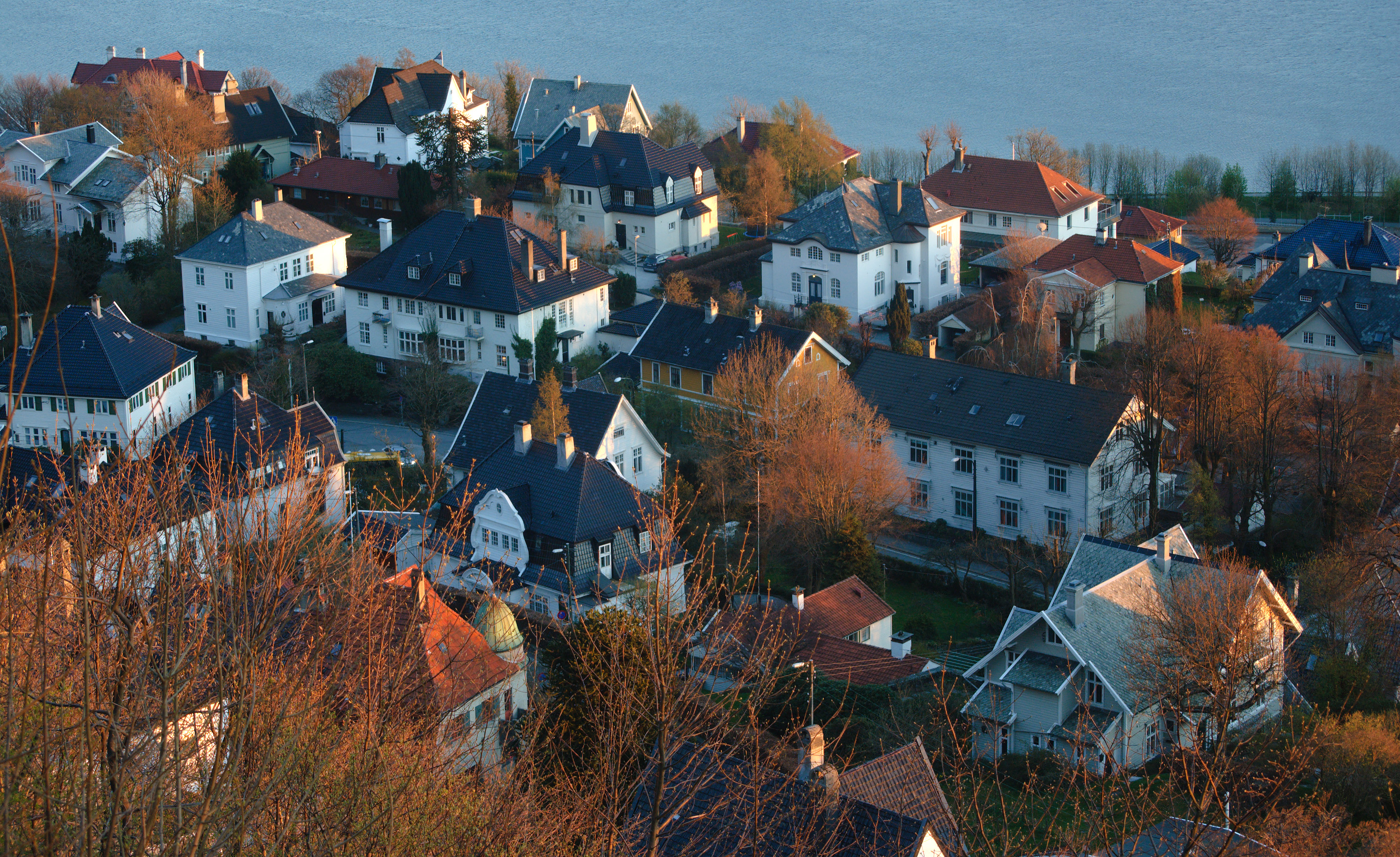
- Houses at Kalfaret
- Interactive map of Kalfaret
- Country: Norway
- County: Vestland
- District: Midhordland
- Municipality: Bergen
- Borough: Bergenhus

Area
  - Total: 0.82 km^{2} (0.32 sq mi)

Population (2010)
  - Total: 2,846
  - Density: 3,500/km^{2} (9,000/sq mi)
- As an unofficial area the population can't be fully determined
- Time zone: UTC+01:00 (CET)
  - Summer (DST): UTC+02:00 (CEST)

Kalfaret is a neighborhood in the city of Bergen in Vestland county, Norway. The neighborhood is located in the borough of Bergenhus, just north of the Store Lungegårdsvannet bay, east of the city centre. The area is an affluent neighborhood, although it is close to the main train line that runs into Bergen Station.

== History ==
Prior to the end of the 19th century, the prominent citizens of Bergen had lived side by side with the rest of the city's population. However, as they became increasingly wealthy and influenced by international ideas and fashions, the upper classes sought to distance themselves from the dirt and the bustle of the city.

Kalferet, located along the main route to Bergen, presented a more genteel but still convenient location and soon became the natural choice for the well-to-do. It is still a well-heeled neighbourhood to this day and most of the large villas built around 1900 remain intact.

The Hansa Brewery was formerly situated in Kalfaret.

== Notable people from Kalfaret ==
- Erna Solberg, Norway's former prime minister
