= Bergen Hospital Trust =

Norwegian health trust

Helse Bergen HF
- Company type: Health Trust
- Industry: Healthcare
- Founded: 1 January 2002
- Headquarters: Norway, Bergen
- Area served: Hordaland
- Key people: Eivind Hansen (CEO); Ranveig Frøiland (Chair)
- Number of employees: 14,045 (2023)
- Parent: Western Norway Regional Health Authority
- Website: www.helse-bergen.no

Bergen Hospital Trust (Norwegian: Helse Bergen HF) is one of the five health trusts owned by the Western Norway Regional Health Authority.

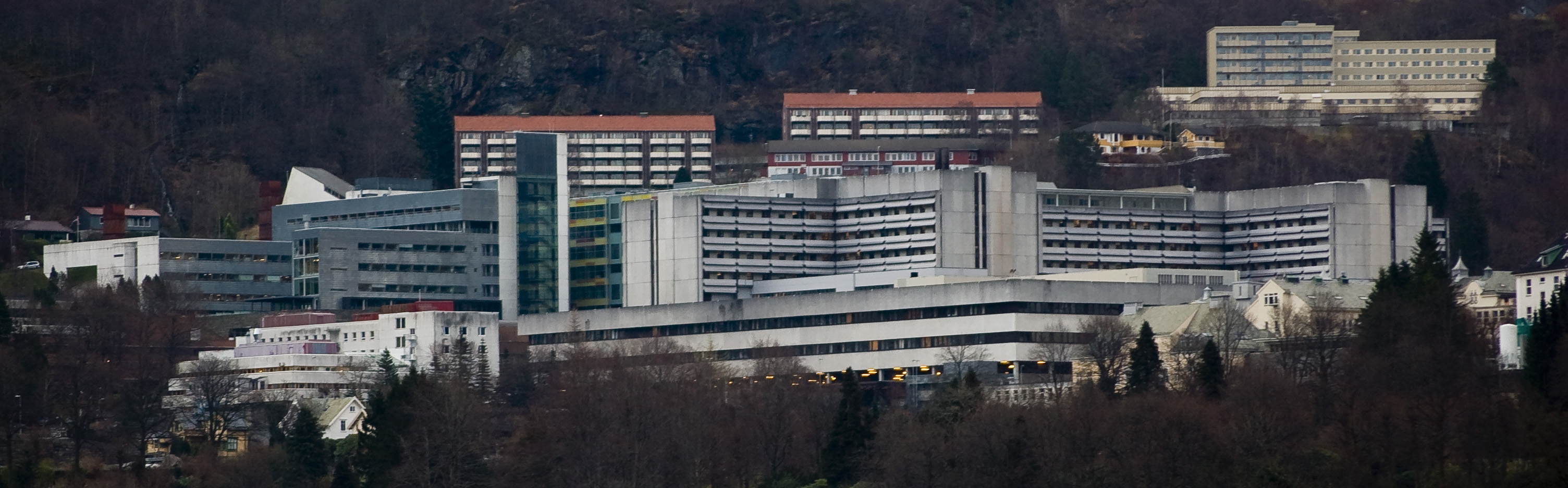
Haukeland University Hospital in Bergen

== Institutions ==
It consists of 14 institutions, located all over Hordaland.

- Haukeland University Hospital
- Sandviken Hospital
- Voss Hospital
- Kysthospitalet i Hagevik
- Bjørgvin DPS
- Kronstad DPS
- Øyane DPS
- The Rehabilitation Centre on Nordås
- Askøy Addiction Treatment
- Tertnes Addiction Treatment
- Floen Addiction Treatment
- Skuteviken Addiction Treatment
- Klokkarvik Addiction Treatment
- Kanalveien Addiction Treatment
