= Førde Hospital Trust =

Norwegian health trust

Førde Hospital Trust (Norwegian: Helse Førde) is a health trust which administrates hospitals and institutions in Sogn og Fjordane, Norway, and is owned by Western Norway Regional Health Authority

Førde Health Trust was founded in 2002, and took control of the hospitals and psychiatric institutions from the Sogn og Fjordane County Municipality as part of the national health reforms.

The health trust has responsibility for the common specialist health services in Sogn og Fjordane. There are six clinics and one division, divided into four hospitals and other somatic and psychiatric institutions in Nordfjord, Sunnfjord and Sogn. It also has responsibility for the ambulance service in the county.

In 2005, Førde Hospital Trust had 2300 employees, and a budget of 1.4 billion kroner. The administration takes place as Førde Central Hospital, the largest employer in Sogn og Fjordane.

== Hospitals and institutions ==
- Førde Hospital
- Nordfjord Hospital
- Lærdal Hospital
- Local Hospital at Florø
- Nordfjord Psychiatry Centre (NSP)
- Førde BUP
- Sogndal BUP
- Nordfjord BUP
- Indre Sogn Psychiatry Centre (ISP)
- Youth Psychiatric Health Service (UPH)
