= Nordfjord Hospital =

Geography
- Location: Nordfjordeid, Stad, Norway
- Coordinates: 61°54′44″N 5°59′42″E

Organisation
- Care system: Public
- Type: District
- Affiliated university: Western Norway Regional Health Authority (Helse Vest)

Helipads
- Helipad: Yes

Links
- Website: www.helse-forde.no/steder/nordfjord-sjukehus/

Nordfjord Hospital (Norwegian: Nordfjord Sjukehus) is a regional hospital located in Nordfjordeid, Stad Municipality, Vestland county, Norway.

It serves as the primary somatic hospital for the Nordfjord region, covering the municipalities of Stad, Stryn, Gloppen, and Kinn. The hospital is operated by the Førde Hospital Trust (Helse Førde), which is part of the state-owned Western Norway Regional Health Authority.

== History ==
=== Establishment (1936-1949) ===
The establishment of a hospital in Nordfjordeid was largely made possible by the American millionaire and painter William Henry Singer Jr., who lived in Olden at the estate Singerheimen.

Following the death of a close friend, Sivert W. Yri, who died of appendicitis while being transported to Bergen for surgery, Singer committed to funding a local hospital to prevent similar tragedies. He donated 100,000 NOK toward the construction, while the land in Prestemarka was donated by local residents John Myklebust and Olav Monsson.

The hospital opened in 1936. Just weeks after its inauguration, it served as the primary medical response center following the Lodalen landslide disaster, treating the survivors of the catastrophic event.

The first chief physician was Hans Christian Wennevold.

In 1961, after 25 years of service as a chief physician, Wennevold was awarded the King's Gold Medal of Merit. County Governor Schei, who presented the medal, said in his speech that the King wished in this way to acknowledge and thank Wennevold for his great and wholehearted efforts at Nordfjord Hospital since it opened in 1936.

=== Expansions and threats 1950s-2000s ===
The hospital was managed by a private foundation until 1950, when it was taken over by the Sogn og Fjordane county administration.

It was in 1967 that the director of health, Karl Evang, wanted to convert the hospitals at Nordfjordeid, Høyanger and Florø into nursing homes. Expand into Lærdal and establish a central hospital in Førde. This was rejected by the county council and by the government of Per Borten (Sp).

in 1971, the government of Trygve Bratteli (Ap) decided to build a central hospital in Førde and reduce operations at Nordfjordeid, Høyanger and Florø. This led to resignations from the Labour Party and torchlight processions for the local hospitals.

As a result of the protests in 1973, the Bratteli government advocated for a central hospital in Førde, as well as expanding Lærdal, Nordfjordeid, Florø and Høyanger. These expansions were complete in 1977. The expansions that began in 1976 and again 1987 where accommodate growing medical needs and specialized services.

=== Modern day: 2000s - ===
In 2001, the state took over the operation of the hospitals, and health trusts were established.

In 2011, the emergency department and maternity ward at Nordfjord Hospital and Lærdal Hospital were closed. This created large local protests and the labour party losing support local support. Liberal Party candidate Alfred Bjørlo presented himself as a defender of the hospital leading to a victory of 43.9% of the votes in the municipal elections.

In 2024 it was suggested to close the emergency clinic at the Hospital. This was prevented when Norway's Minister of Health Jan Christian Vestre intervened.

In 2026 there are new proposals for cuts in Lærdal and Nordfjordeid. Due to economic concerns at Helse Førde Trust.

This has led to significant local protests.

== Facilities and services ==
Nordfjord Hospital is a somatic facility providing a range of specialized health services, including:

- Medical Section: Responsible for inpatient wards and polyclinics specializing in cardiology, lung diseases, and geriatrics.
- Surgical and Orthopedic Services: Including a 24-hour injury polyclinic (skadepoliklinikk).
- Maternity Services:The hospital maintains local maternity and birthing facilities, which have been the subject of significant national political debate regarding the preservation of local healthcare services.

The hospital complex also houses the Nordfjord Psychiatric Center (Nordfjord psykiatrisenter), which provides mental health and substance abuse treatment for the region. The total building area for the hospital and psychiatric facilities is approximately 23,000 square meters.
