= St. James's Church, Bergen =

Church in Vestland, Norway

St. James's Church
- St. Jakob kirke
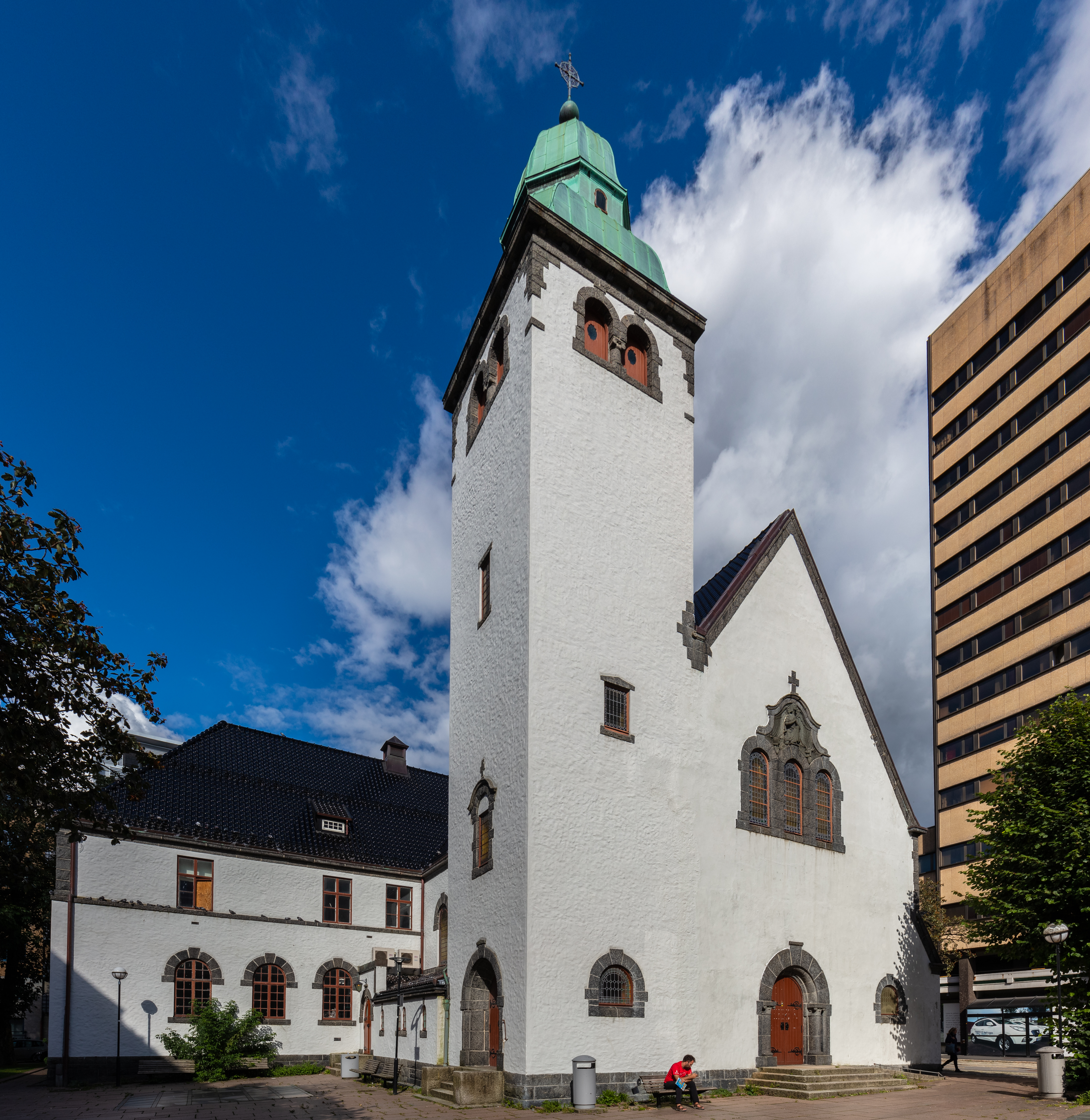
- View of the church
- St. James's Church
- 60°23′12″N 5°19′53″E
- Location: Bergen, Vestland
- Country: Norway
- Denomination: Church of Norway
- Churchmanship: Evangelical Lutheran

History
- Status: Parish church
- Founded: 1921
- Consecrated: 5 May 1921

Architecture
- Functional status: Active
- Architect: Daniel Muri
- Architectural type: Long church
- Completed: 1921 (105 years ago)

Specifications
- Capacity: 550
- Materials: Plastered brick

Administration
- Diocese: Bjørgvin bispedømme
- Deanery: Bergen domprosti
- Parish: Bergen domkirke
- Norwegian Cultural Heritage Site
- Type: Church
- Status: Listed
- ID: 85533

Saint James's Church (Norwegian: Sankt Jakob kirke) is a special parish church in Bergen municipality in Vestland county, Norway. It is located in the Nygård area of the city of Bergen. The church is part of Bergen Cathedral parish in the Bergen domprosti (arch-deanery) in the Diocese of Bjørgvin. The white, plastered brick church was built in a long church design in 1921 using plans drawn up by the architect Daniel Muri. The church, which seats about 550 people, was consecrated on 5 May 1921.

== History ==
The parish of St. James was established in 1917. Daniel Muri was hired to design a new church for the new parish. The church was built from 1917 until 1921. It was consecrated on 5 May 1921. The church was a parish church for St. James's parish in central Bergen from 1921 until 2002. In 2002, several urban parishes in central Bergen were merged to form Bergen Cathedral parish. At the same time, St. James's Church ceased to be a regular parish church. From 2002 until 2007, the building was leased to Normisjon, a Norwegian missionary organization, to be a special mission church called "Norkirken Bergen". In 2013, the church was re-opened as a special parish church focusing on younger people. This is a special collaboration between the diocese, the parish, and the local YMCA and YWCA.

== Media gallery ==
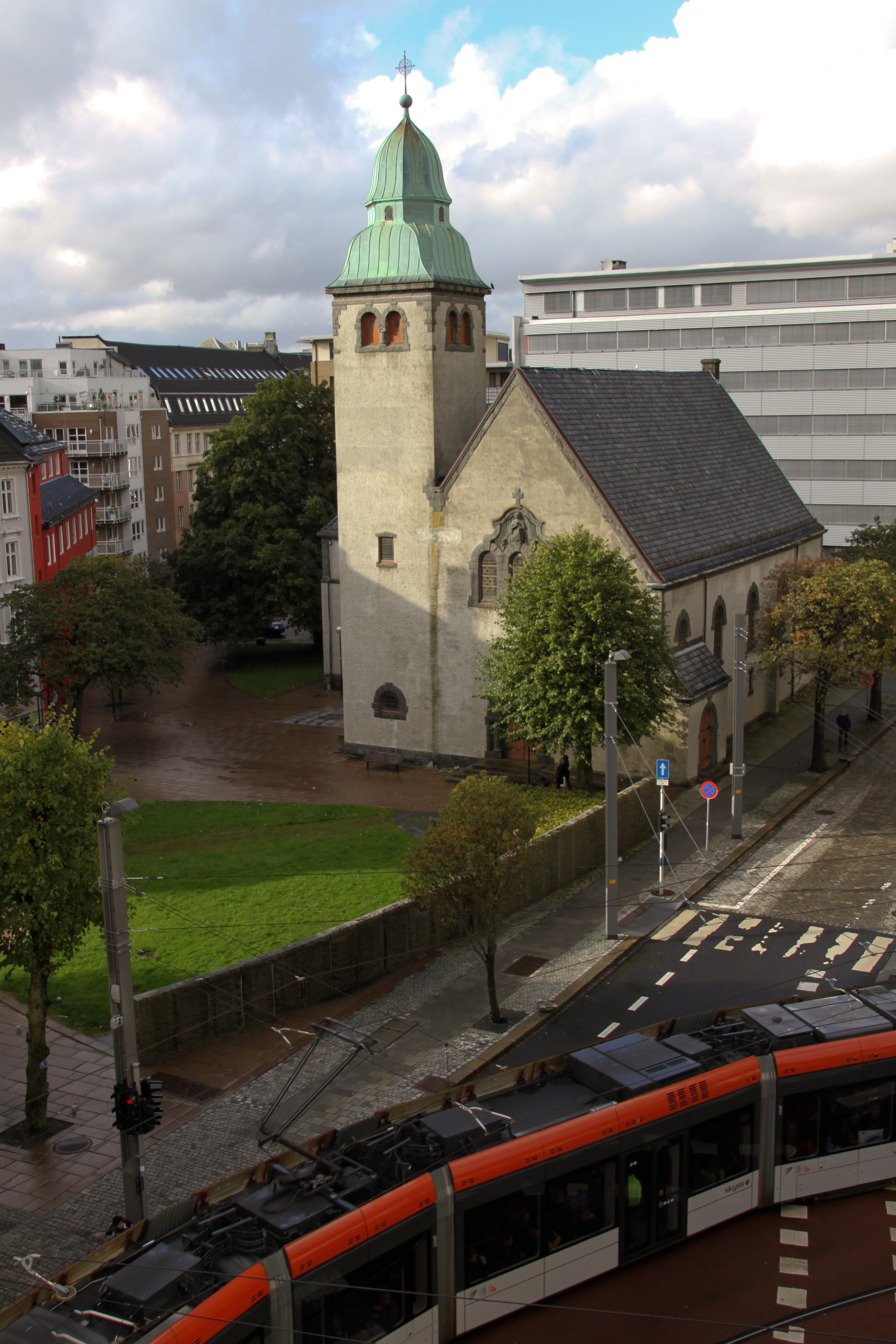

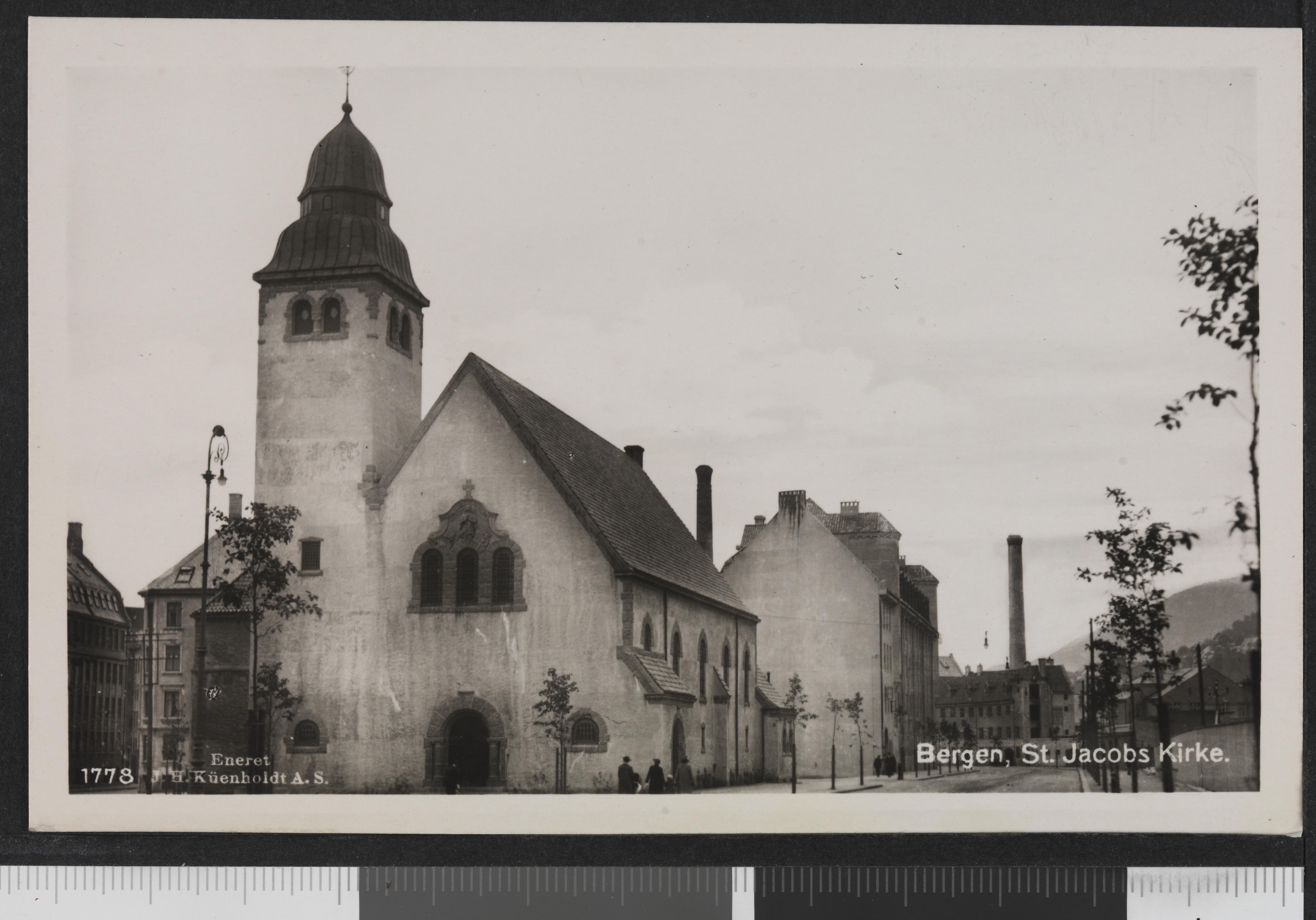

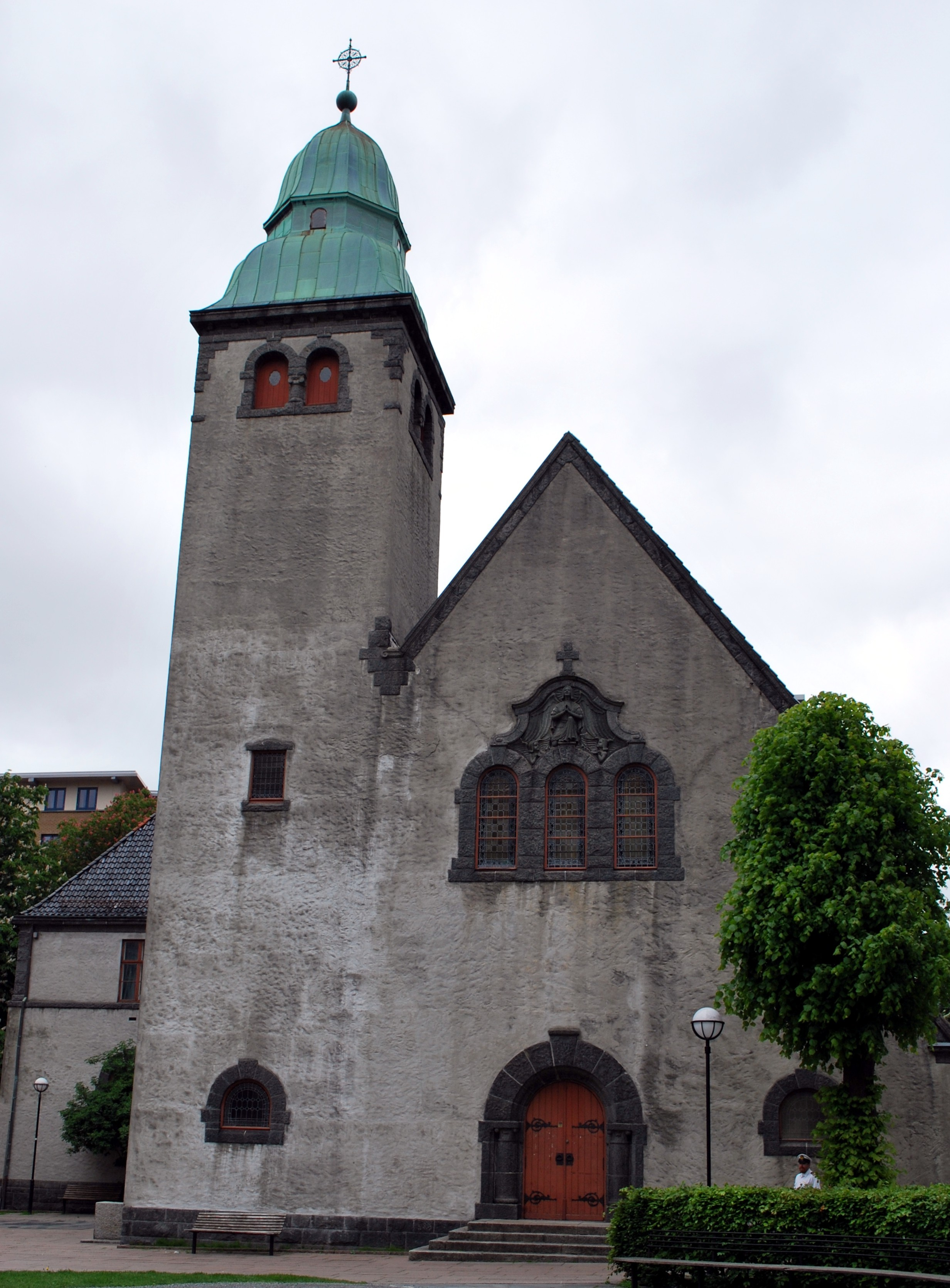

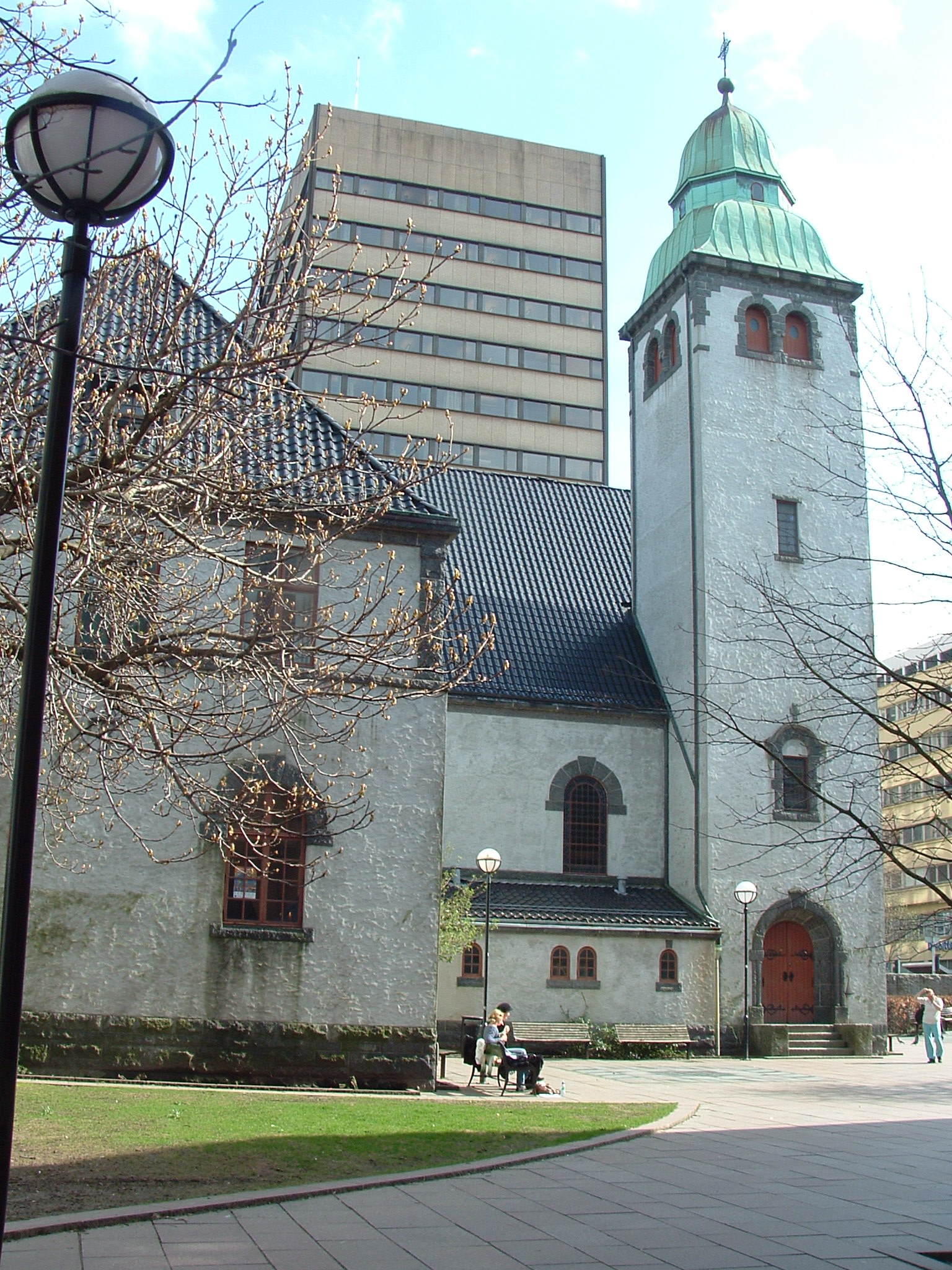

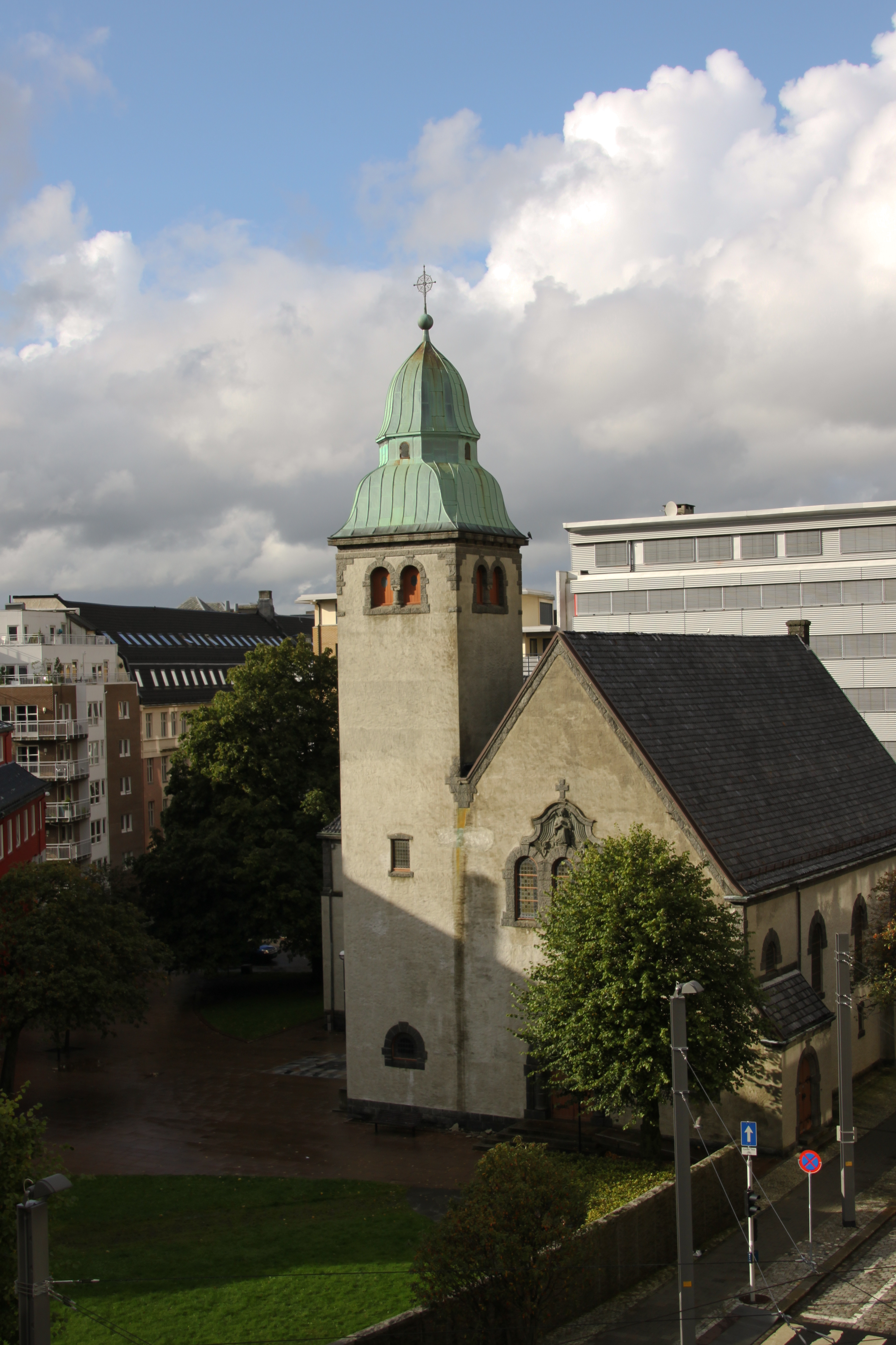

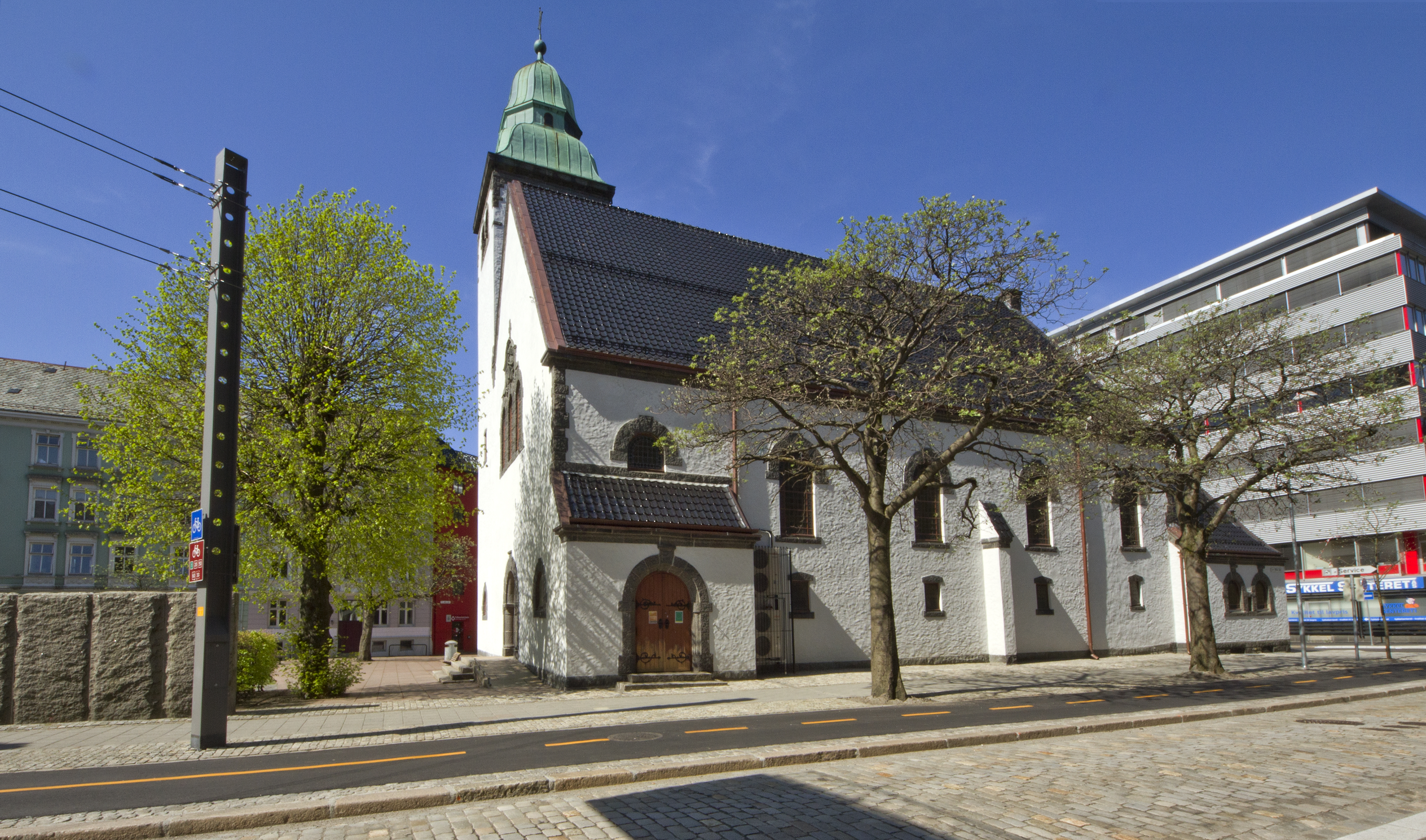

== See also ==
- List of churches in Bjørgvin
