= Kjell Arvid Svendsen =

Norwegian politician (born 1953)

Kjell Arvid Svendsen (born 27 August 1953 in Haugesund) is a Norwegian schoolteacher and politician for the Christian Democratic Party.

== Biography ==
Born 27 August 1953, he was the son of manager Karl Sigfred Svendsen and housewife Anny Kristine Levinsen. He grew up in Skudeneshavn, and after primary and lower secondary school, he attended Hetland Upper Secondary School. Finishing in 1972, he was a teacher at Ådland before returning to his own lower secondary school, Skudenes, where he was a teacher from 1973 to 1995. He took higher education at Stord Teachers' College (1975–1978) and Stavanger Teachers' College (1978–1979).

He entered politics as a deputy member of the municipal council of Karmøy Municipality and as a member of the cultural board from 1983 to 1987. He was then elected to the Karmøy municipal council's executive committee, being steadily re-elected. He served as mayor from 1995 to 2011. He also served as a deputy representative to the Parliament of Norway from Rogaland during the terms 2005–2009 and 2009–2013; meeting regularly in October 2005 while Dagfinn Høybråten was still a member of the outgoing Bondevik's Second Cabinet.

Svendsen chaired the Karmøy Christian Democratic Party from 1987 to 1988. He chaired the Rogaland Christian Democratic Party from 2004 to 2007, during which time he was also a member of the party's national board. He has been active in the Norwegian Lutheran Inner Mission Society and a board member of the companies Gassnor (1996–2004), Haugaland Bompengeselskap (chairman, since 2001), KLP Skadeforsikring (since 2005) and Fonna Health Trust (since 2006).
