= Sydnes =

Coordinates: 60.3908°N 5.3116°E

- Neighbourhood
- Nickname: Sydnes
- Interactive map of Sydnes
- Country: Norway
- County: Vestland
- District: Midhordland
- Municipality: Bergen
- Borough: Bergenhus

Area
  - Total: 0.40 km^{2} (0.15 sq mi)

Population (2010)
  - Total: 1,320
  - Density: 3,300/km^{2} (8,500/sq mi)
- As an unofficial area the population can't be fully determined
- Time zone: UTC+01:00 (CET)
  - Summer (DST): UTC+02:00 (CEST)

Sydnes is a traditional neighbourhood in the city of Bergen in Vestland county, Norway. It is located along the Puddefjorden in the southern part of the city centre of Bergen. TV 2 has its headquarters at Sydnes. The Johanneskirken is located in this neighborhood.
