= Verftet =

Coordinates: 60.3958°N 5.3087°E

- Neighbourhood
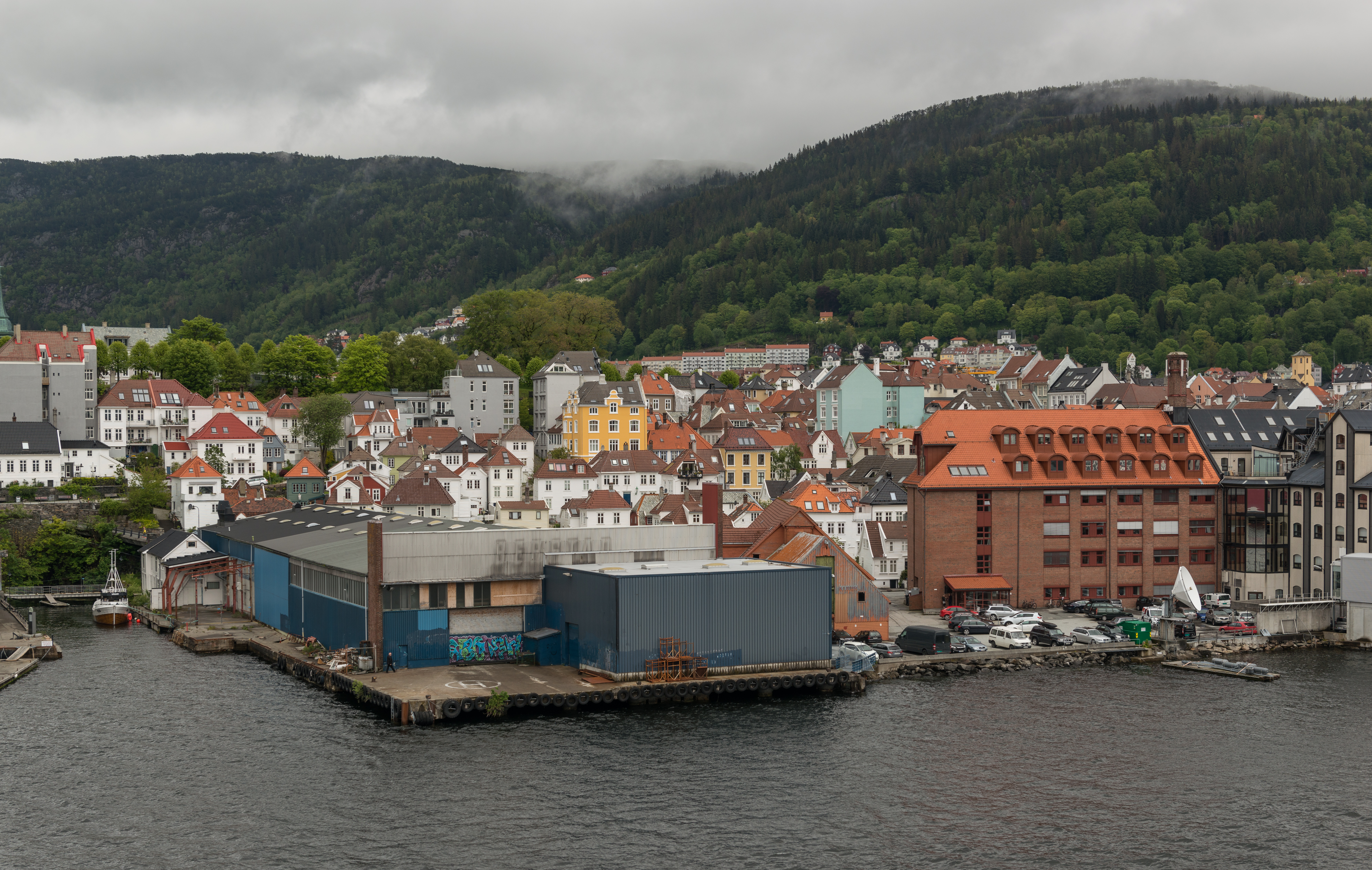
- West view of Verftet
- Nickname: Verftet
- Interactive map of Verftet
- Country: Norway
- County: Vestland
- District: Midhordland
- Municipality: Bergen
- Borough: Bergenhus

Area
  - Total: 0.08 km^{2} (0.031 sq mi)

Population (2010)
  - Total: 537
  - Density: 6,700/km^{2} (17,000/sq mi)
- As an unofficial area the population can't be fully determined
- Time zone: UTC+1 (CET)
  - Summer (DST): UTC+2 (CEST)

Verftet is a neighbourhood of Bergen, Norway. It is located on the Nordnes peninsula. It is the location of Georgernes Verft.
