= Sandviken, Norway =

Coordinates: 60.4059°N 5.3242°E

Sandviken
- Neighbourhood
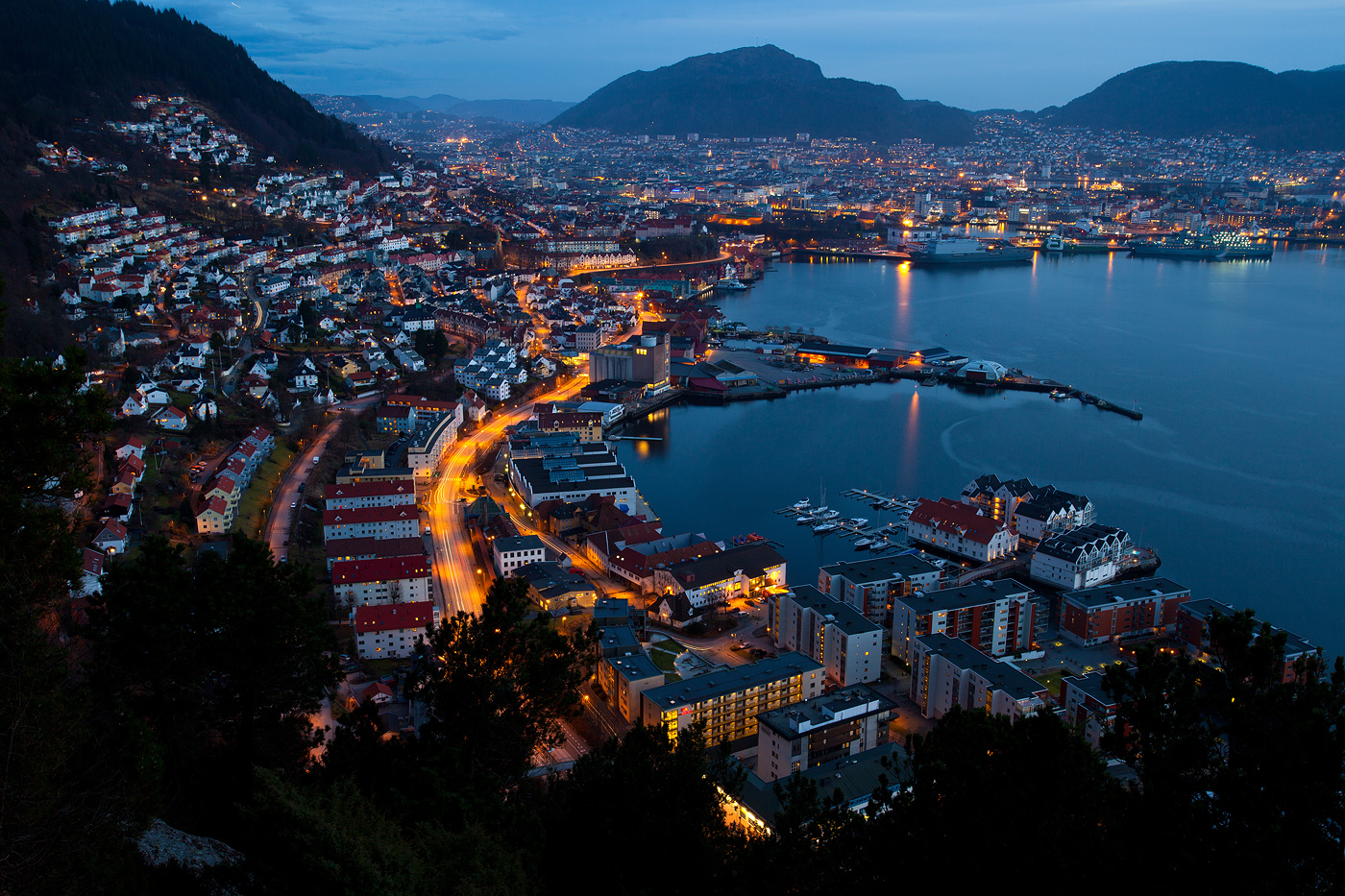
- Sandviken, Bergen
- Interactive map of Sandviken
- Country: Norway
- County: Vestland
- District: Midhordland
- Municipality: Bergen
- Borough: Bergenhus

Area
  - Total: 3.43 km^{2} (1.32 sq mi)

Population (2009)
  - Total: 12,625
  - Density: 3,680/km^{2} (9,500/sq mi)
- As an unofficial area the population can't be fully determined
- Time zone: UTC+01:00 (CET)
  - Summer (DST): UTC+02:00 (CEST)

Sandviken is a traditional neighbourhood of the city of Bergen in Vestland county, Norway.

== Location ==
Geographically, it is located northeast of the city center, in a small bay off the Byfjorden. The neighbourhood begins north of Bergenhus Fortress, and follows the coastline facing west. The Sandvik Road is the main thoroughfare through the area, which mostly consists of residential buildings. Sandviken has around 13,000 inhabitants.

The early development of Sandviken consisted largely of water mills and shipyards. Later, traders from Bergen built landing places and warehouses in the area. Sandviken was long an isolated suburb of Bergen. The road to Sandviken traveled through Ladegården. The new, wider route to Sandviken was established during 1869-1873.

== Gamle Bergen Museum ==
Gamle Bergen Museum is an outdoor museum in the neighborhood of Sandviken. Museum Association was established in 1934, and the museum opened to the public in 1949. It is now part of the City Museum in Bergen. It is built around the old former country retreat of Elsesro. The Open-air museum has buildings from the 1700-1800s that have been moved from different areas of this site. Old Bergen is a reconstructed town with approximately 50 wooden houses. The buildings consist mainly of one-and two-story wooden house with paneling.

== Sandvik Church ==
Sandvik Church (Sandvikskirken) is a wooden Gothic hall church from 1881. The church has a slightly narrower polygonal ended choir in the east and a tower in the west that is located in the church's long axis. The church had gneiss as a building material with exterior cladding of granite.

Sandviken parish was established on 29 July 1874. The competition for a new church was won by architect Ernst Norgrenn. But after his death in 1880 the plans were modified and completed by architect Schak Bull. The church was completed in autumn 1881 and inaugurated in December 1881.

== Monuments ==
The Madam Felle monument in Sandviken, is in honor of a Norwegian woman of German origin, who in the mid-19th century, managed, as a woman, against the will of the council, to maintain the sale of beer. Madam Felle, civil name Oline Fell (1831–1908), has been remembered since her death through a popular song.

== Gallery ==
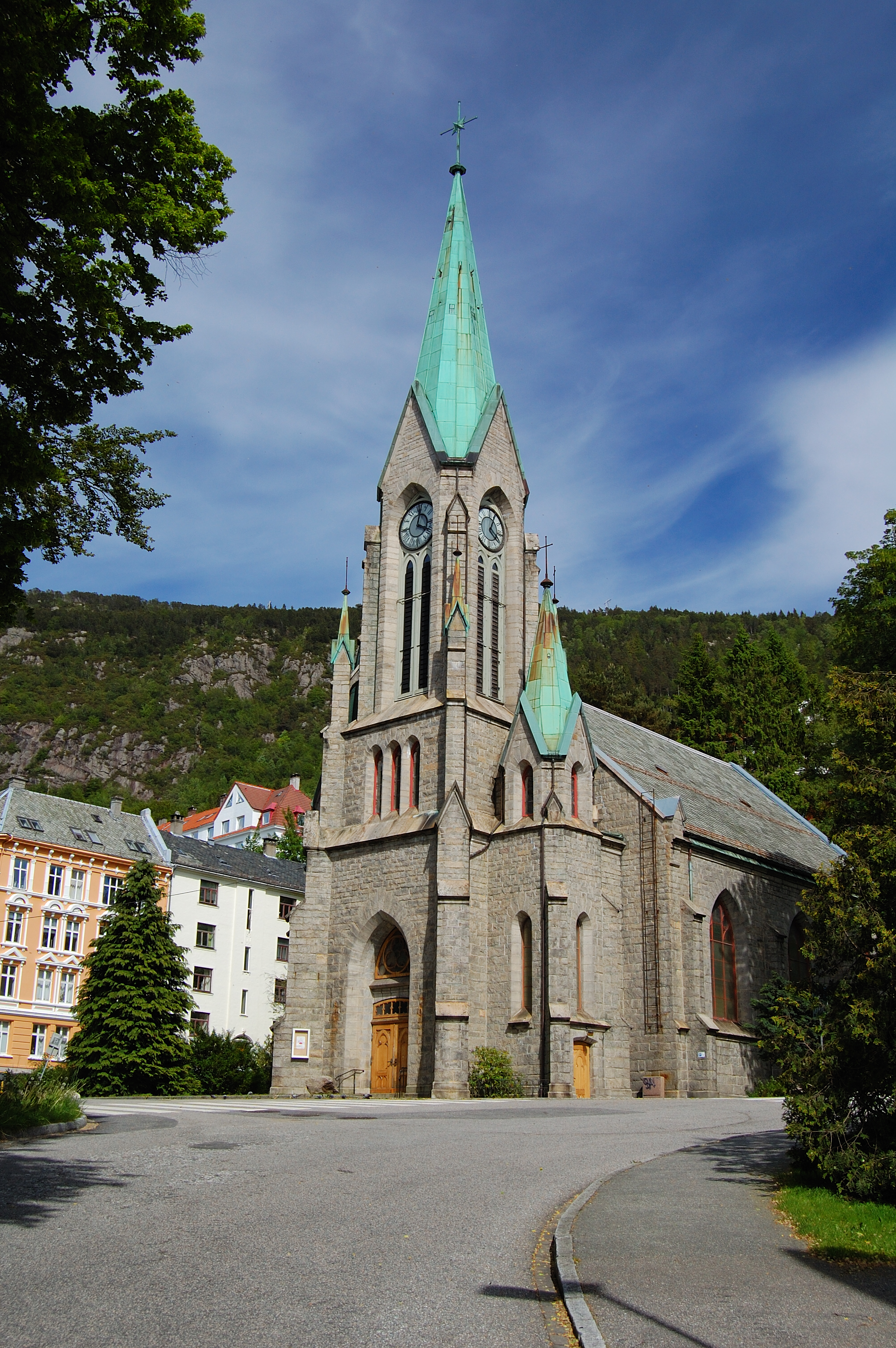
Sandvikskirken

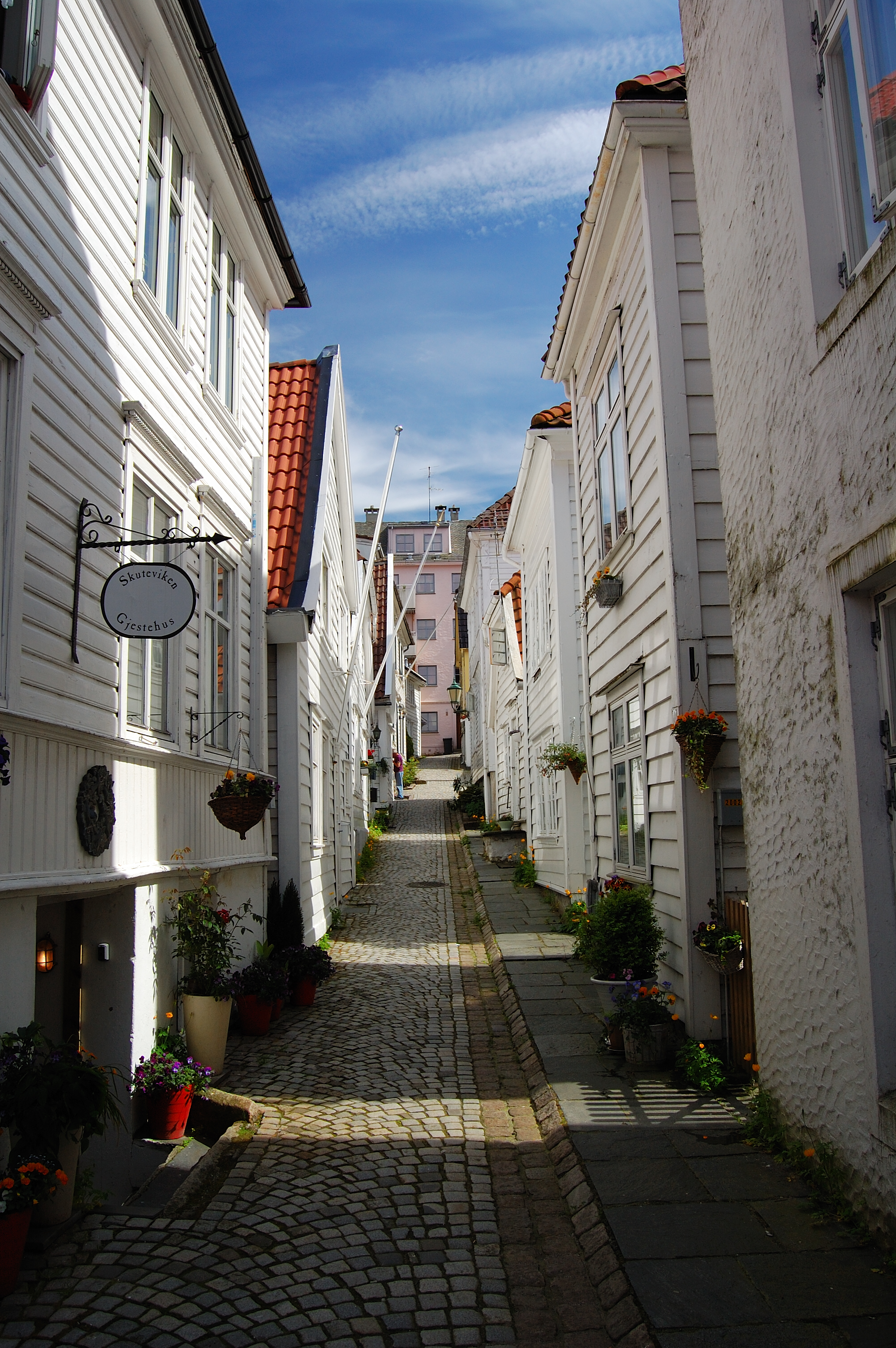
Typical narrow street in Sandviken

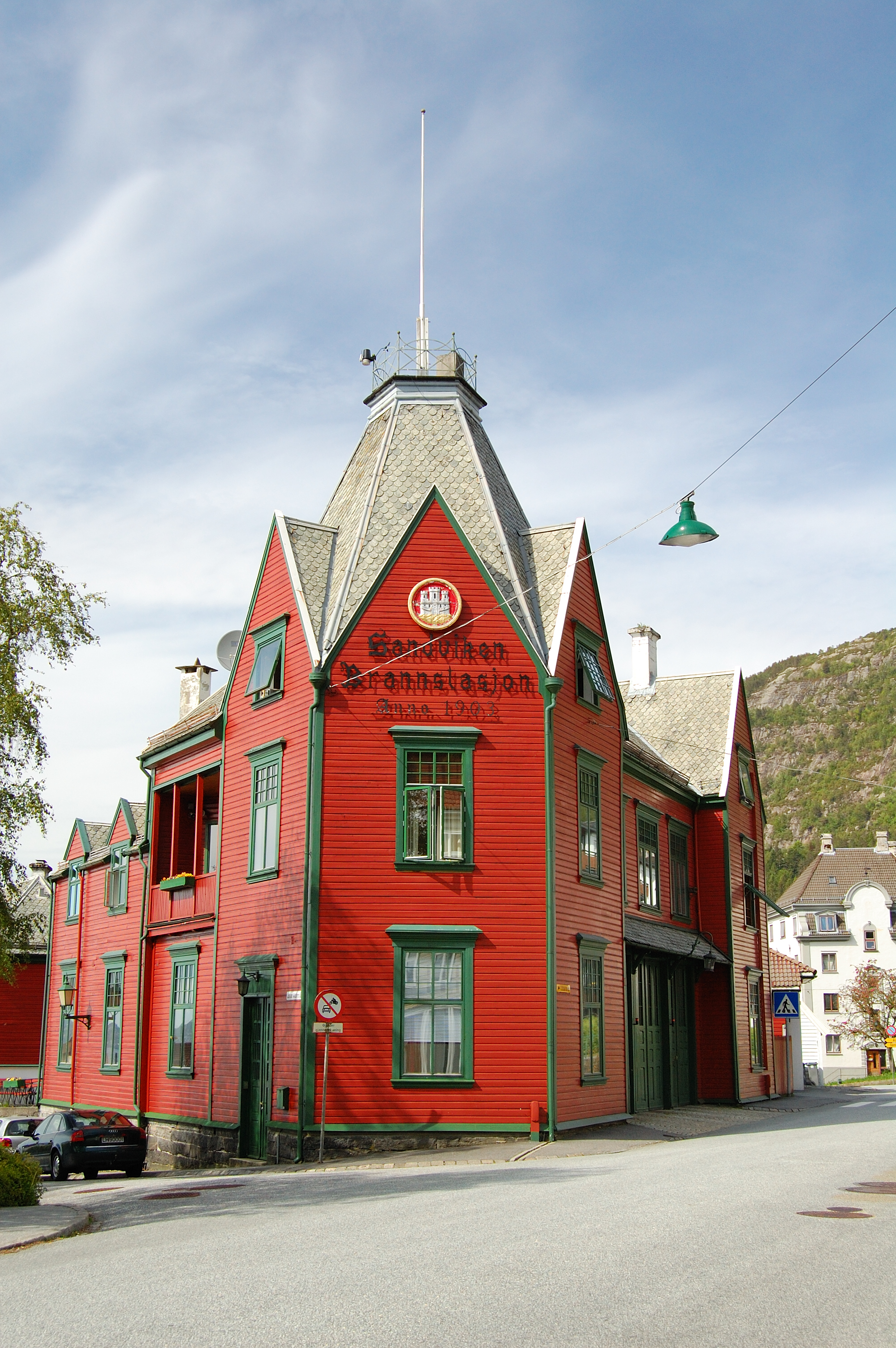
Sandviken Fire Station

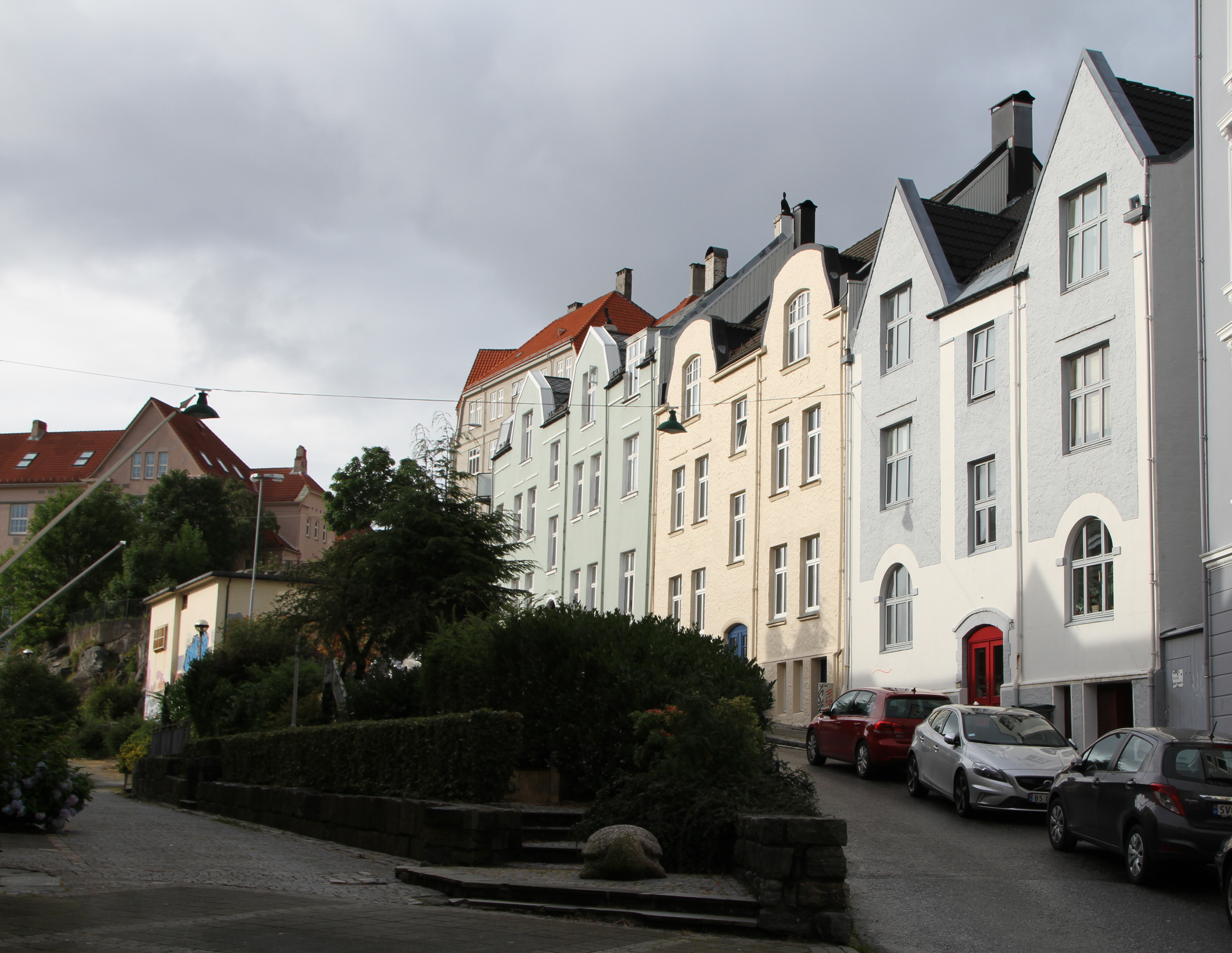

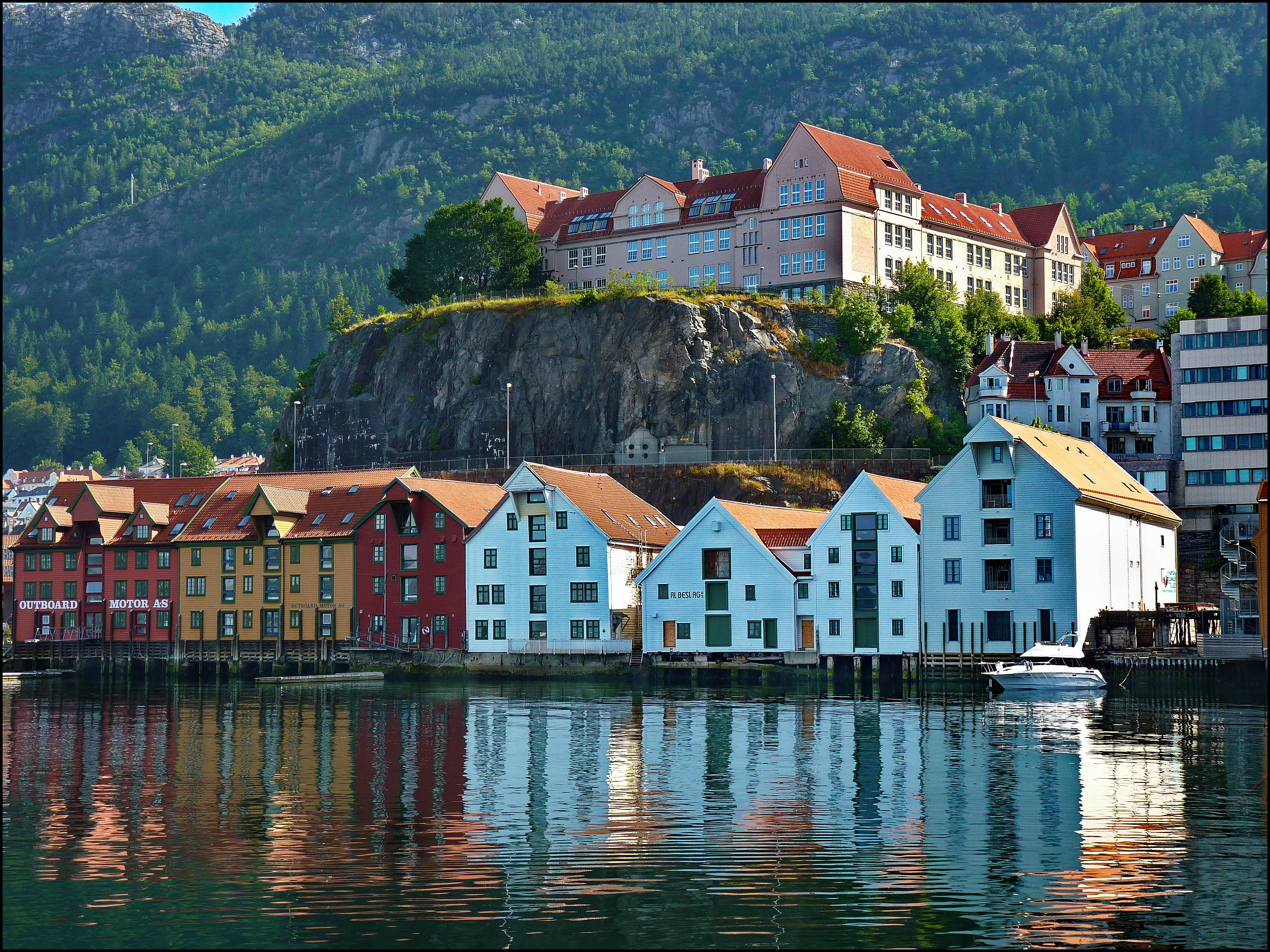
Rothaugen school

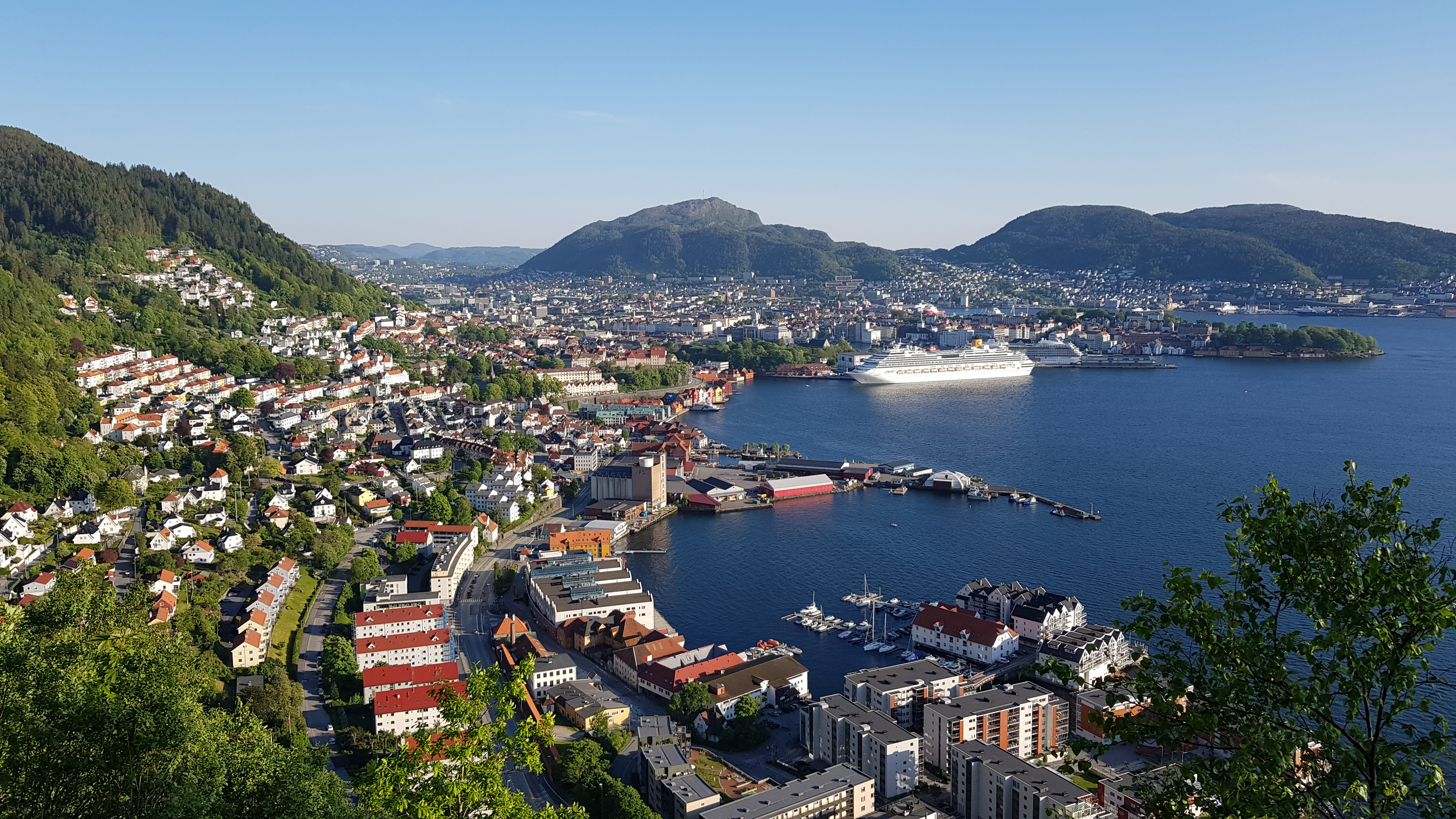

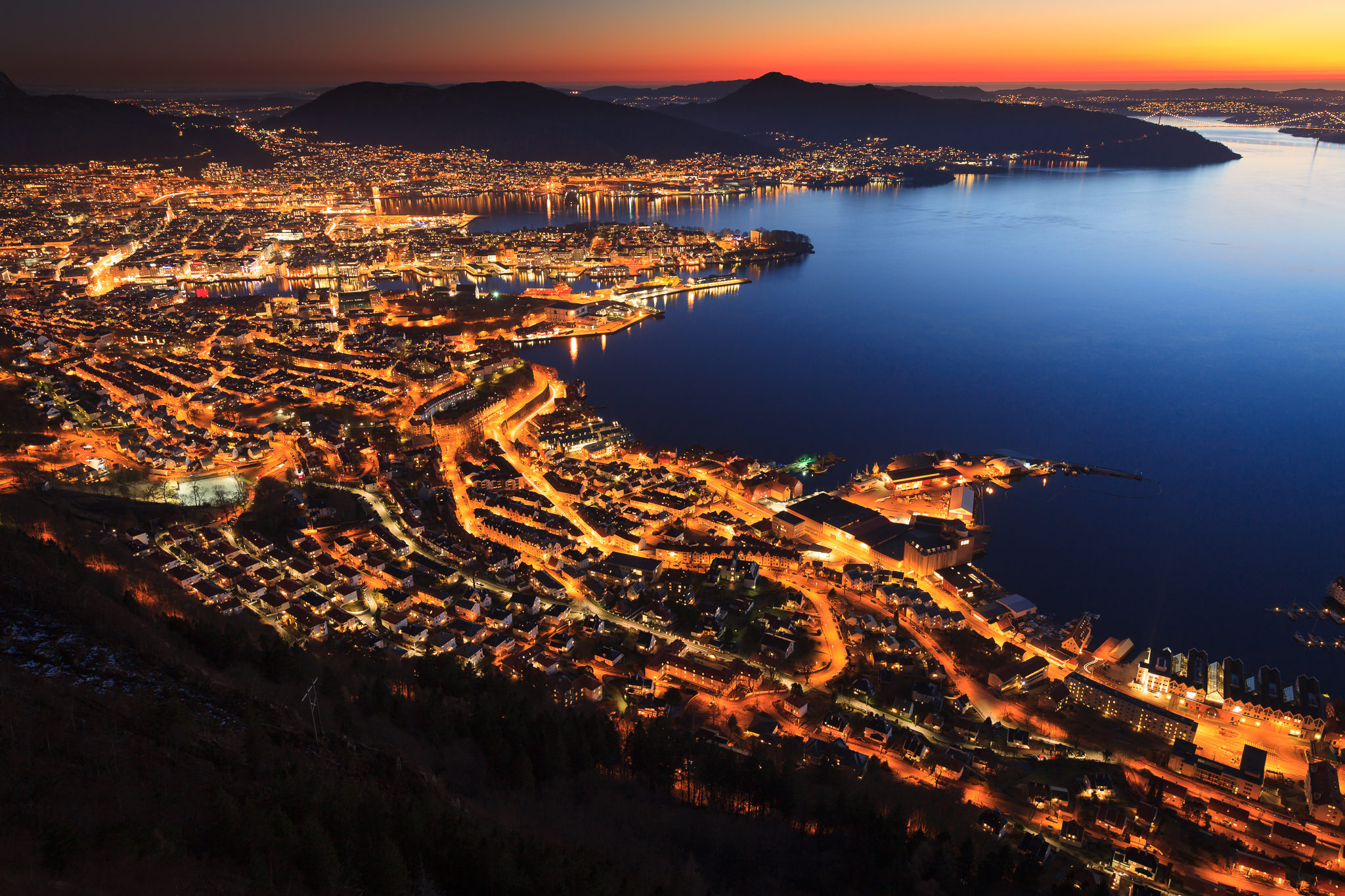
Bergen at night seen from Sandvikspilen
