= St John's Church, Bergen =

Church in Vestland, Norway

St. John's Church
- Johanneskirken
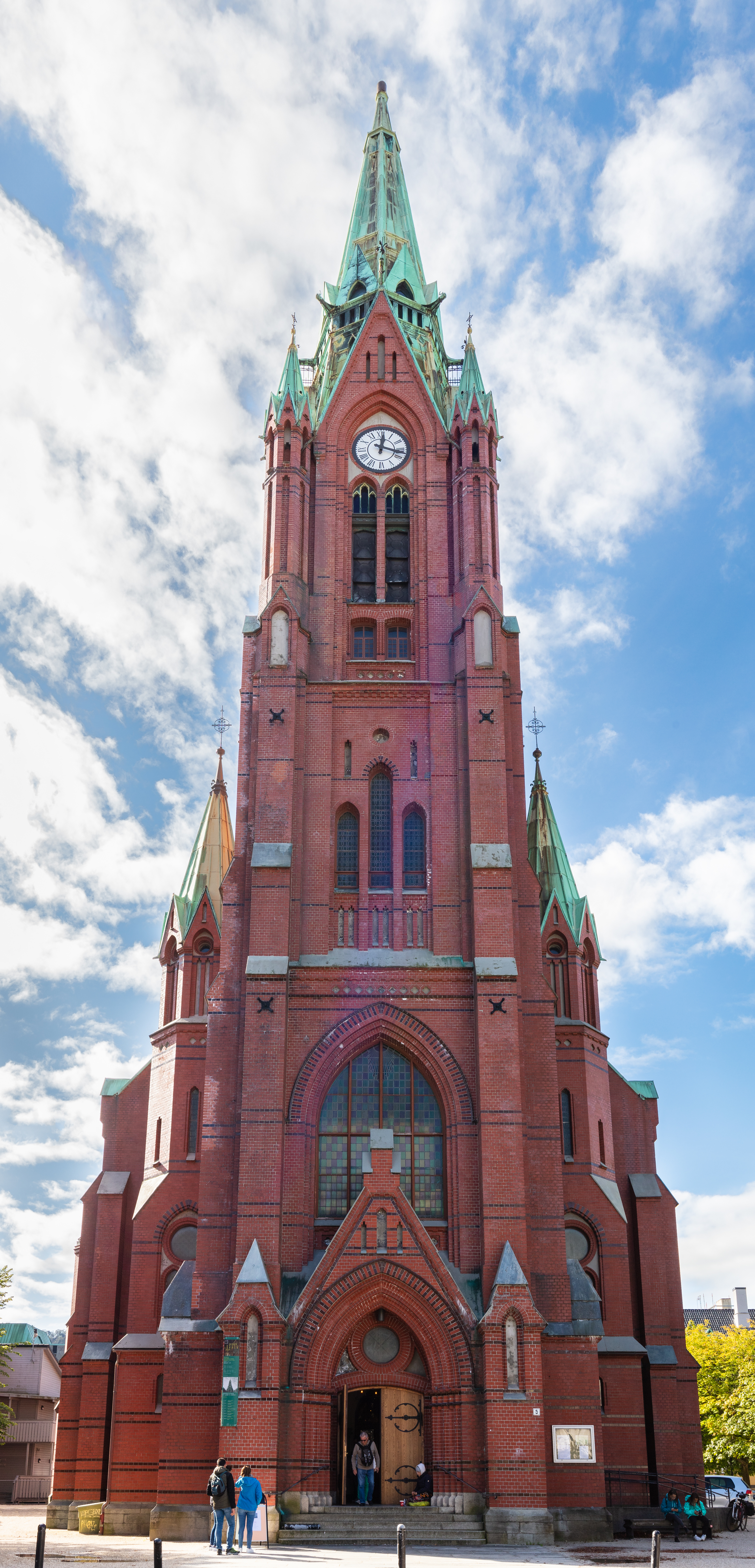
- View of the church
- St. John's Church
- 60°23′19″N 5°19′10″E
- Location: Bergen, Vestland
- Country: Norway
- Denomination: Church of Norway
- Churchmanship: Evangelical Lutheran

History
- Status: Parish church
- Founded: 1885
- Consecrated: 15 March 1894

Architecture
- Functional status: Active
- Architect(s): Herman Major Backer; Adolf Fischer; Hans Heinrich Jess
- Architectural type: Cruciform
- Style: Gothic Revival
- Groundbreaking: 1888
- Completed: 1894 (132 years ago)

Specifications
- Capacity: 690
- Height: 61 metres (200 ft)
- Materials: Brick

Administration
- Diocese: Bjørgvin bispedømme
- Deanery: Bergen domprosti
- Parish: Bergen domkirke
- Norwegian Cultural Heritage Site
- Type: Church
- Status: Listed
- ID: 84737

St. John's Church (Norwegian: Johanneskirken) is a parish church of the Church of Norway in Bergen Municipality in Vestland county, Norway. It is located in the Sydnes area of the city of Bergen. It is one of the five churches for the Bergen Cathedral parish which is part of the Bergen domprosti (arch-deanery) in the Diocese of Bjørgvin. The red brick church was built in a cruciform design between 1891 and 1894 in the Gothic Revival style. The architect was Herman Backer. The church seats 690 people, making it the largest church in Bergen. It was consecrated on 15 March 1894.

== History ==
On 1 January 1885, the new parish of St. John was created out of the large Bergen Cathedral parish. In 1888, an architectural contest was conducted for the design of a new church. It was built from drawings by the architect Herman Major Backer (1856–1932). On 27 November 1891, the cornerstone was laid. The building process was first led by architect Adolf Fischer and from 1891 by Hans Heinrich Jess. The church was consecrated on 15 March 1894. The frescoes in the Church's ceiling date from 1924 and were completed by Hugo Lous Mohr (1889–1970).

The organ was built by Schlag & Söhne of Württemberg, Germany. It was modernized by Josef Hilmar Jørgensen of Oslo in 1967. The altarpiece depicts Christ in prayer and was designed in 1894 by Marcus Grønvold. The church tower is the highest in the city at 61 metres (200 ft). The main tower has four stair towers and a carillon. It was designed by Verein Bochum in Bochum, Westphalia.

The church was a parish church for the St. John's parish in central Bergen from 1894 until 2002. In 2002, several urban parishes in central Bergen were merged to form the Bergen Cathedral parish (Norwegian: Bergen domprosti menighet), which includes five main churches.

== Media gallery ==
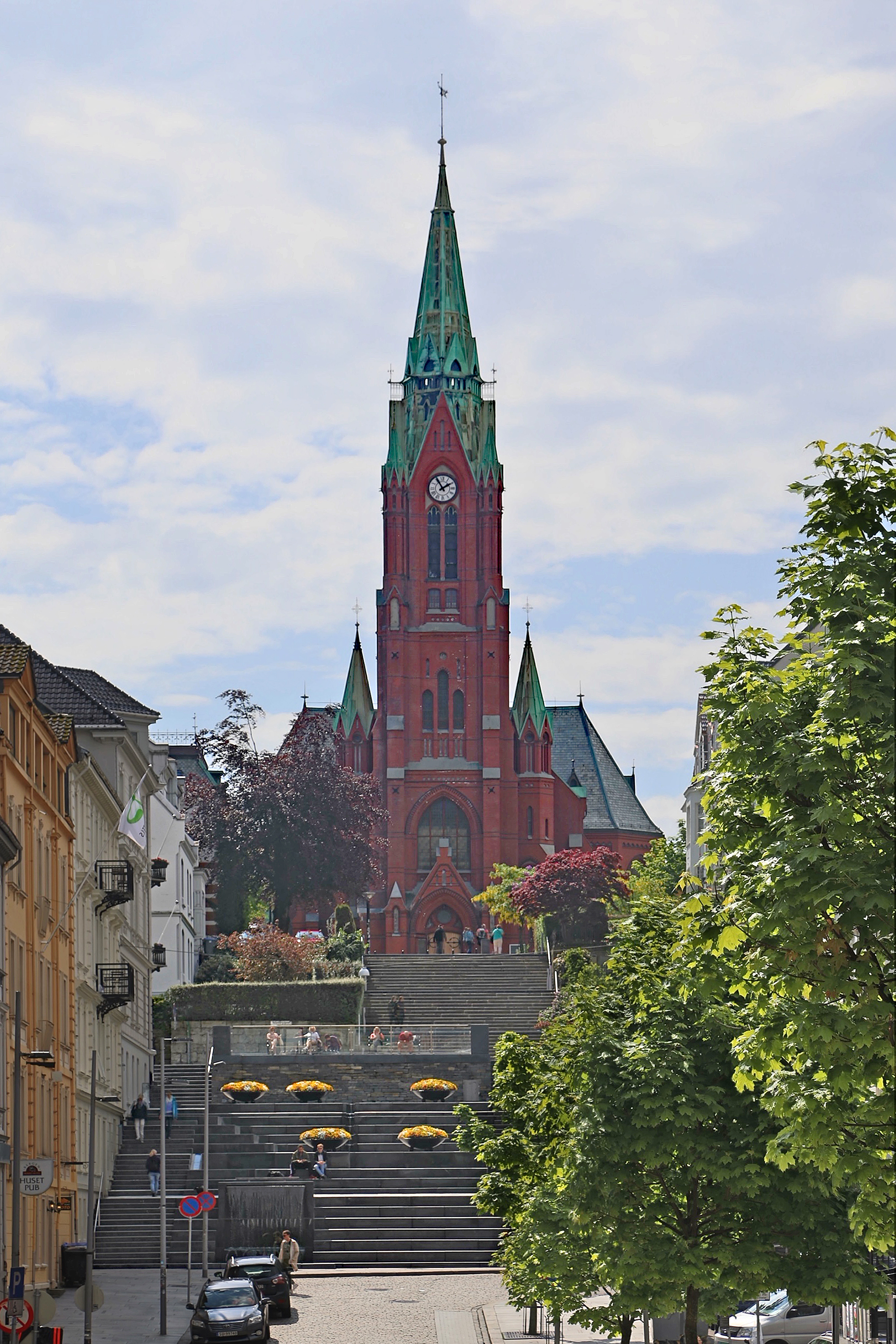
Front view from a distance

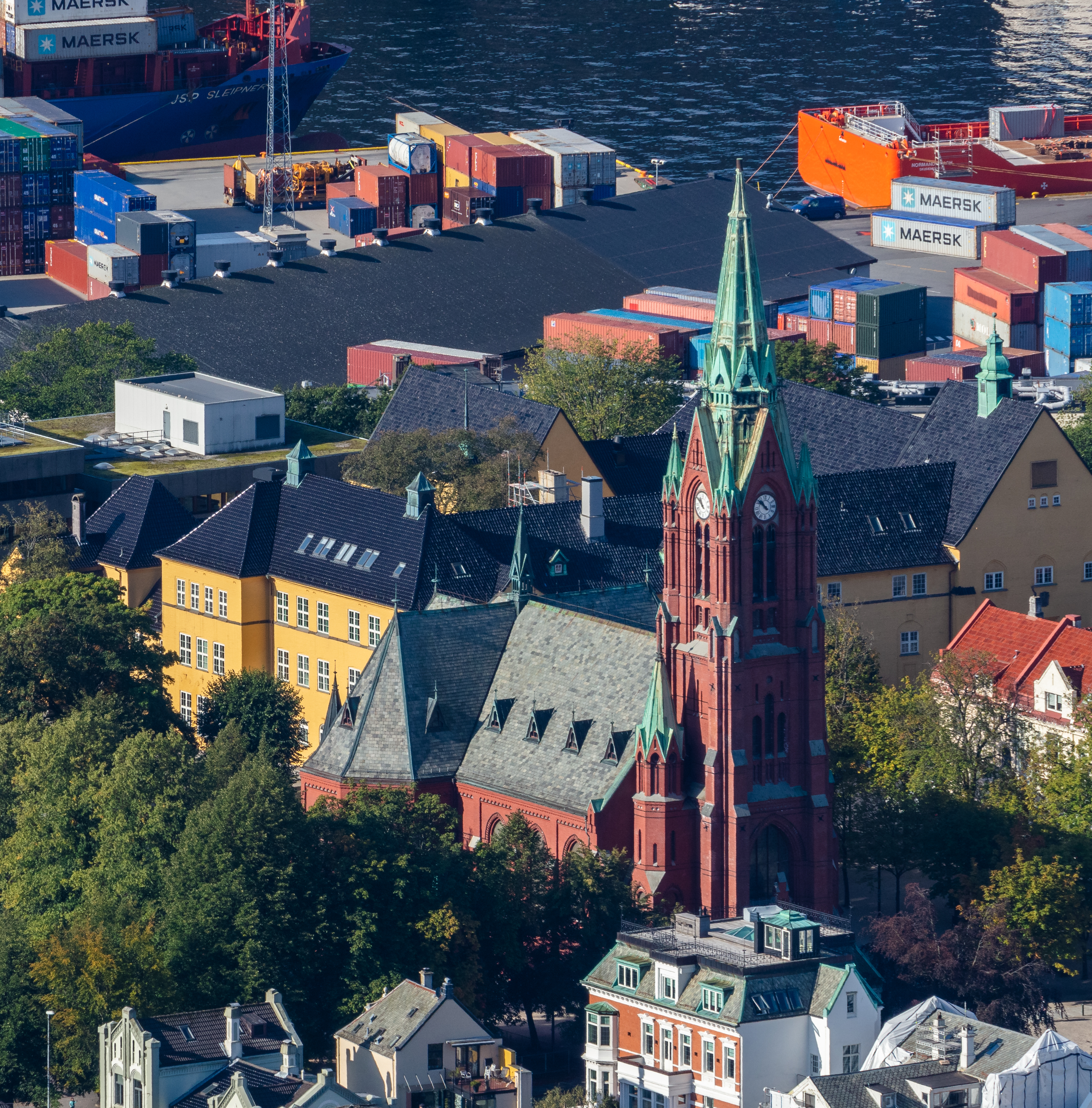
Aerial view

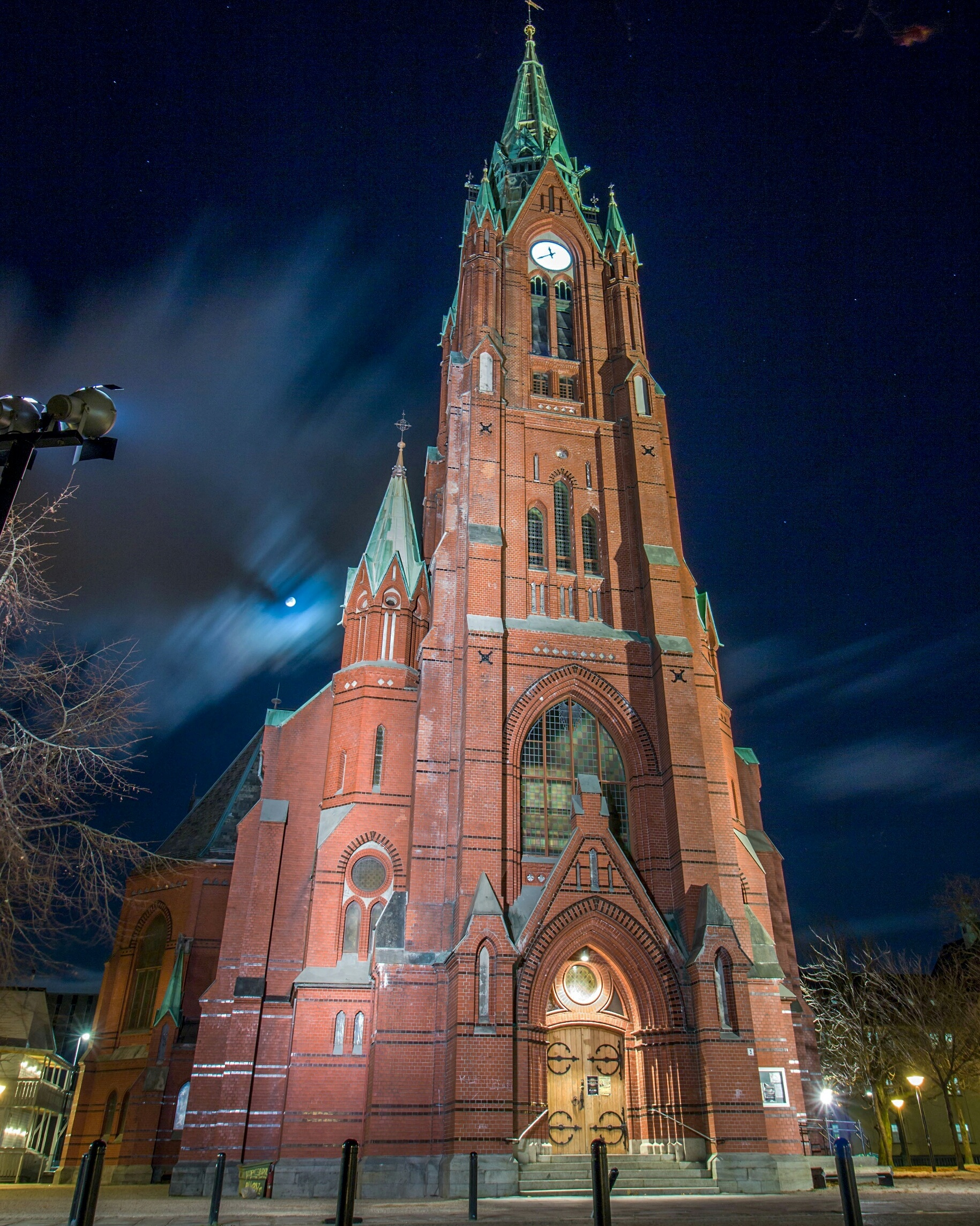
View of the church at night in December, 2016

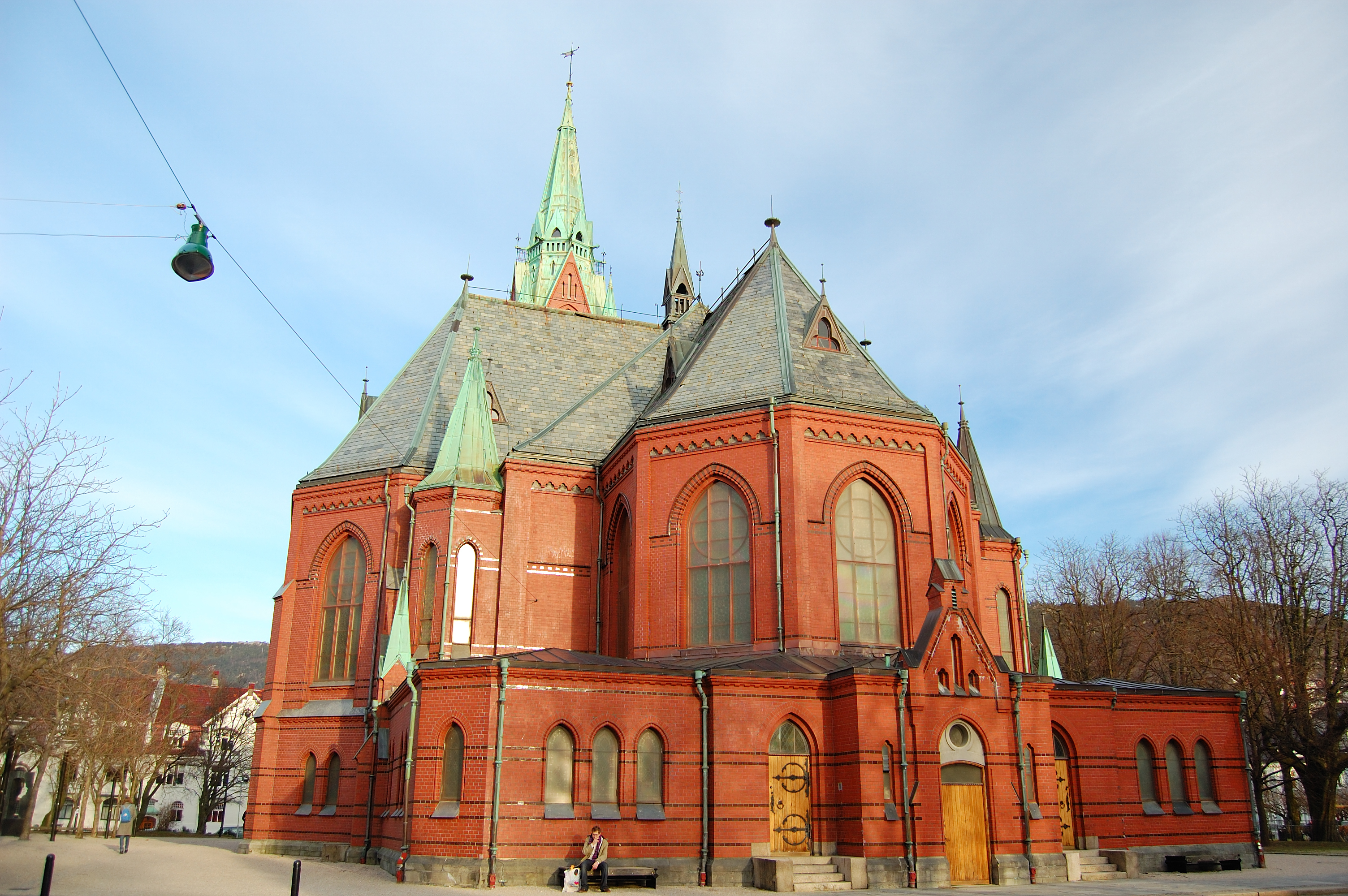
Rear entrance

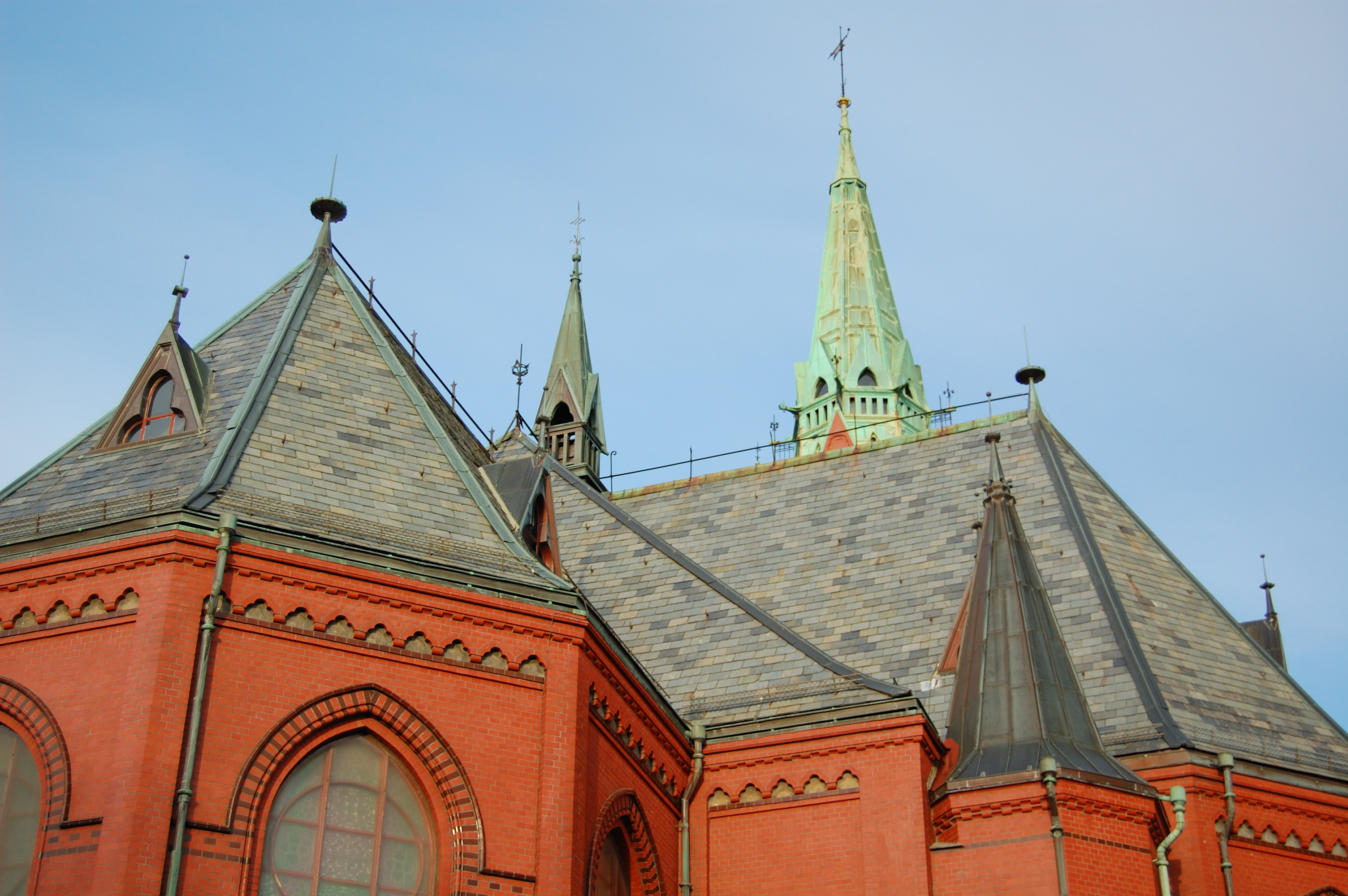
View of roof with tower

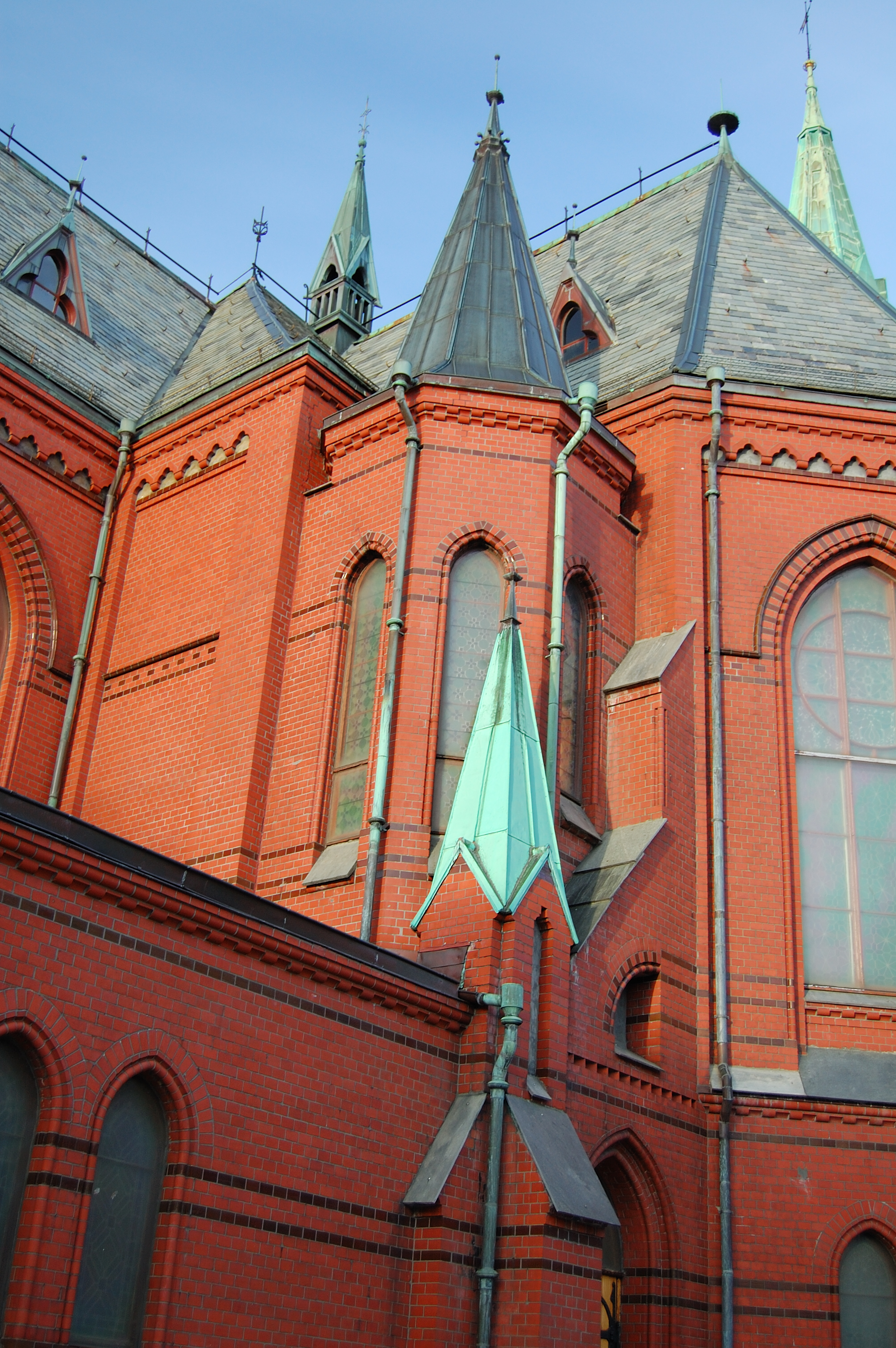
View of roof

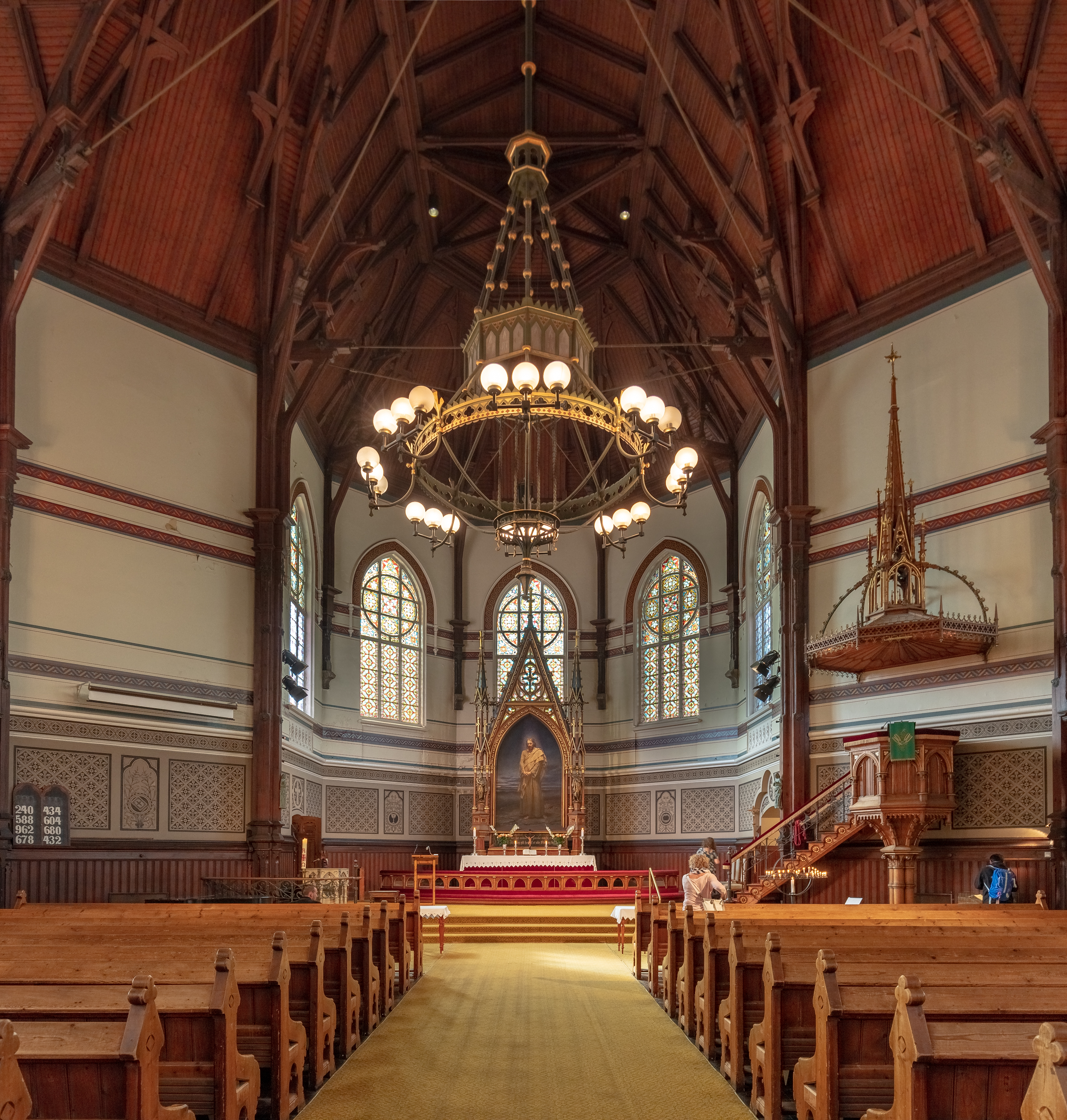
Interior

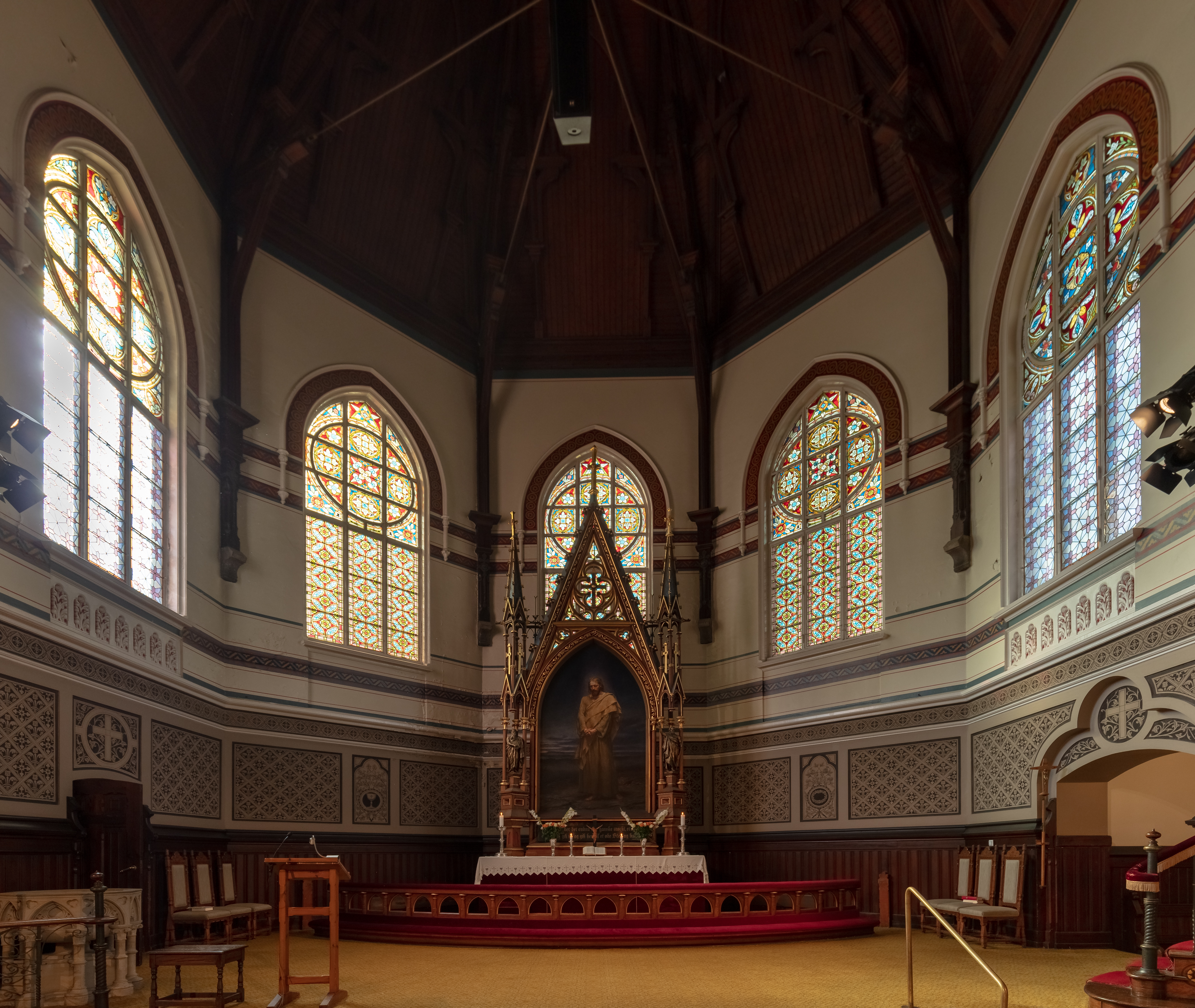
Altarpiece

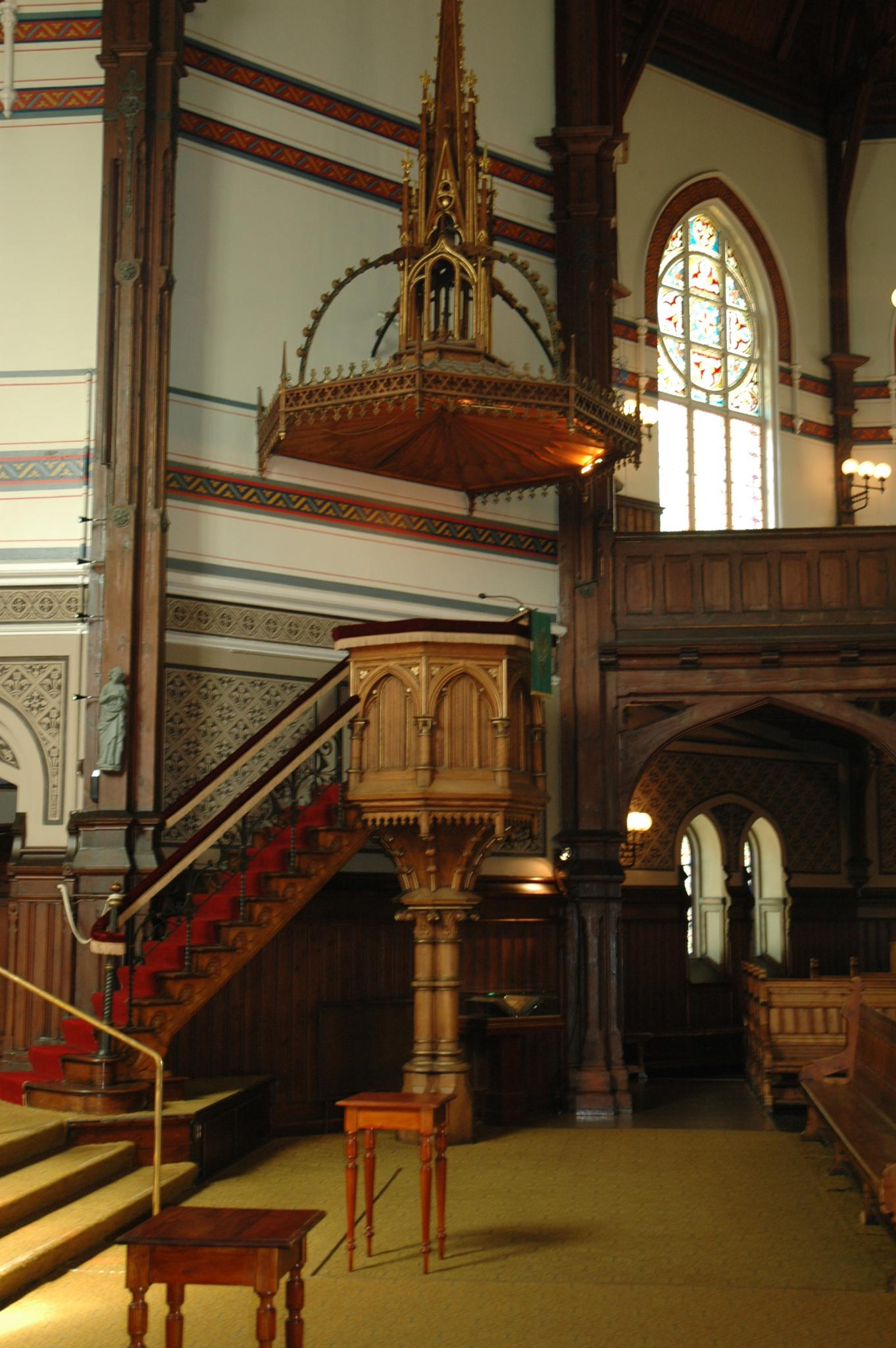
Pulpit

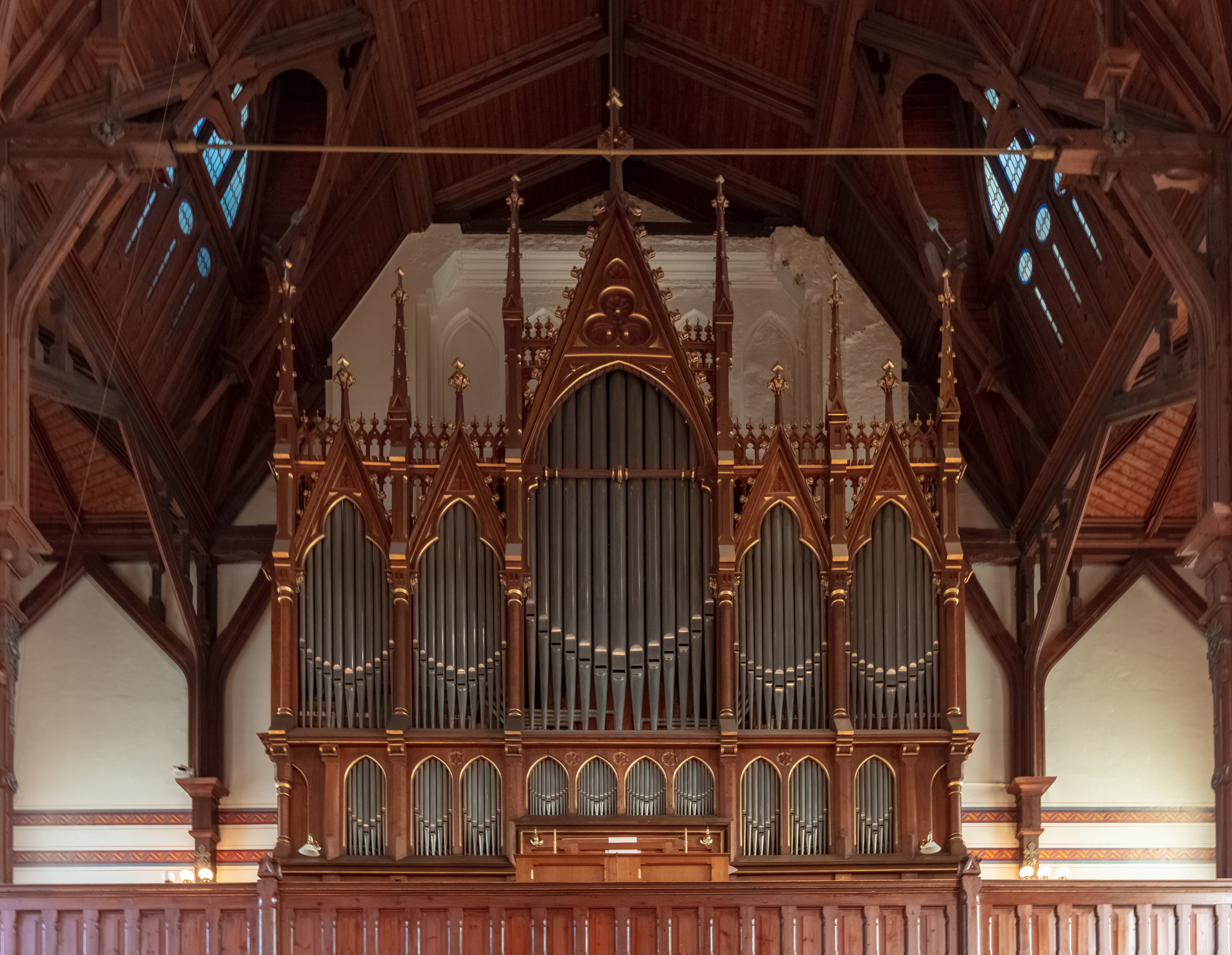
Organ
