= Bergen Light Rail =

Light rail system in Bergen, Norway

Coordinates: 60°23′33″N 5°19′24″E

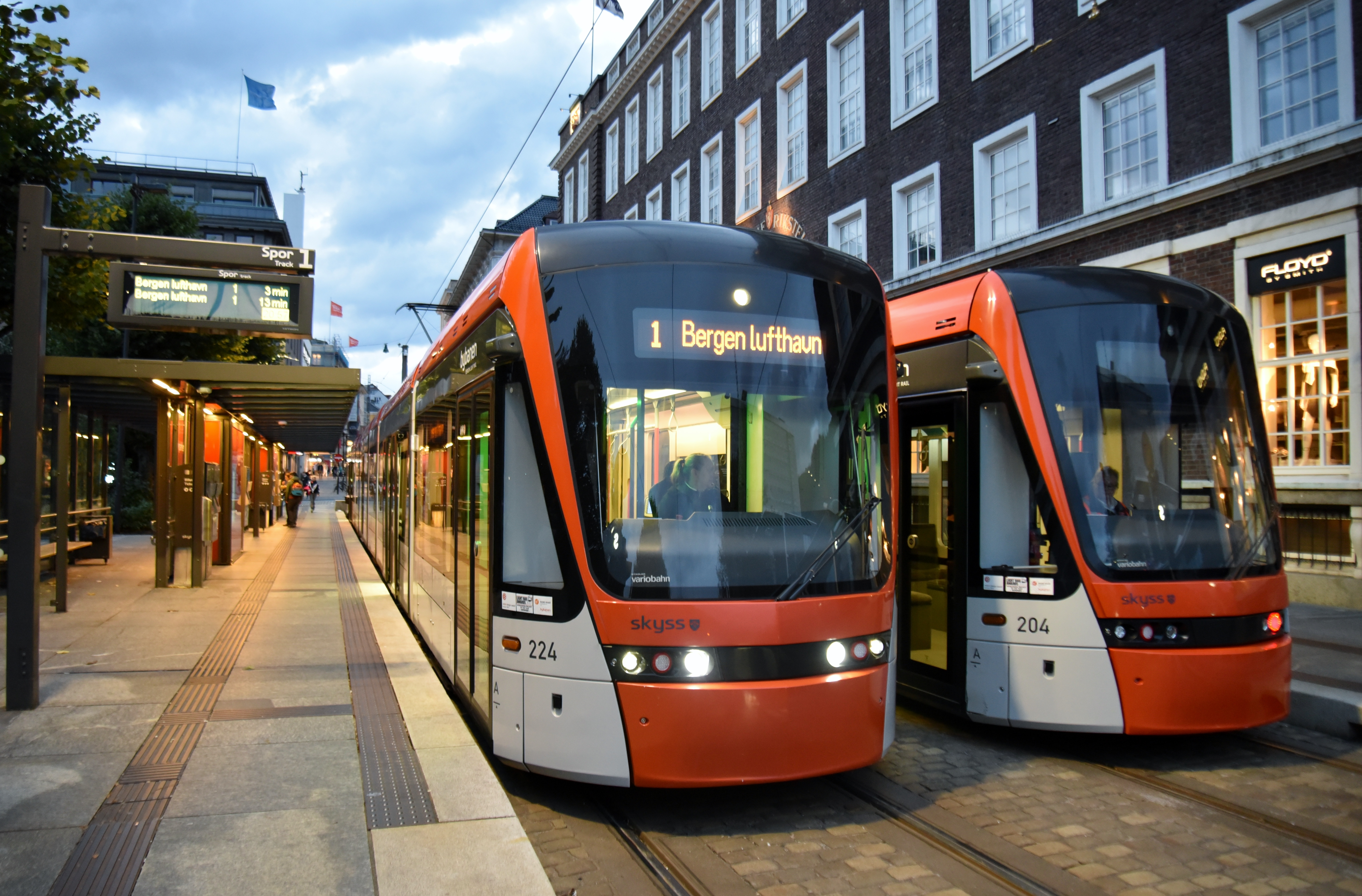
- Trams 224 and 204 at the Byparken terminus

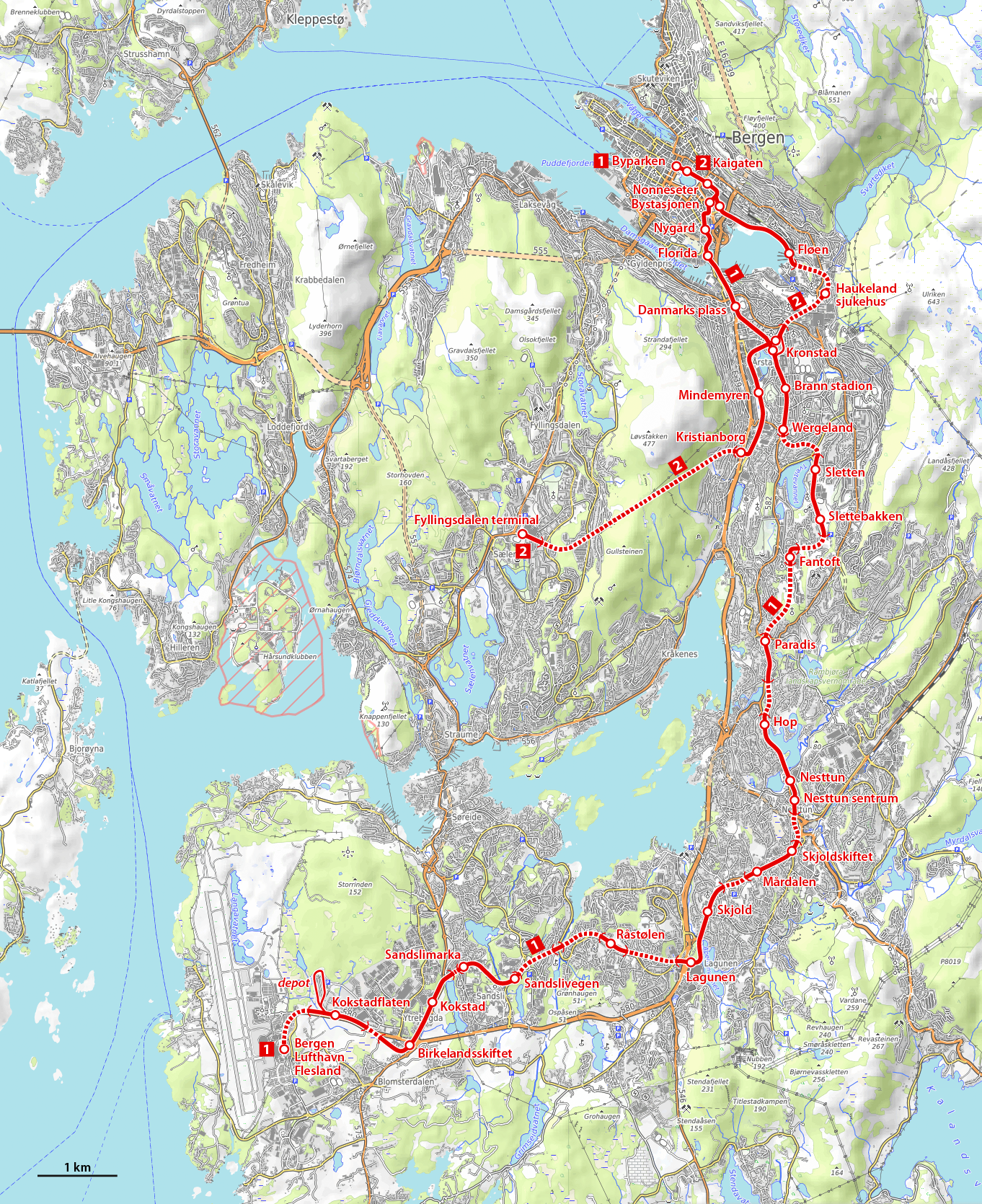
- Network of Bergen light rail

Overview
- Owner: Vestland County Municipality through Bybanen AS
- Locale: Bergen Municipality, Norway
- Transit type: Light rail
- Number of lines: 2
- Number of stations: 35
- Daily ridership: 90000 (2023)

Operation
- Began operation: 22 June 2010
- Operator: Tide Bane on behalf of Skyss
- Train length: 42 m (138 ft)
- Headway: 5–10 minutes

Technical
- System length: 28.4 km (17.6 mi)
- Track gauge: 1,435 mm (4 ft 8 1/2 in)
- Minimum radius of curvature: 25 m (82 ft)
- Electrification: 750 V DC overhead wire
- Average speed: 28 km/h (17 mph)
- Top speed: 70 km/h (43 mph)

Bergen Light Rail (Norwegian: Bybanen) is a light rail system in Bergen Municipality, Norway. The first stage of the project was a twenty-station stretch between the city center and Nesttun, where the first 15 stations comprising a 9.8-kilometre (6.1 mi) stretch opened in 2010, and the second was a 3.6-kilometre (2.2 mi) stretch from Nesttun to Lagunen which opened in June 2013. A third stretch from Lagunen to Bergen Airport, Flesland opened in 2017. A second line opened between Kaigaten and Fyllingsdalen on 21 November 2022. Further plans for the project involve mooted extensions to Åsane and Storavatnet.

Plans for rail transit have existed since the 1970s, following closure of the Bergen Tramway in 1965. A rapid transit design was first discarded, and in the 1990s a light rail line was proposed. The decision to start construction was made in 2005. The first stage was built by the municipality, with financing from the state and the toll road ring based on an agreement known as the Bergen Program. Ownership, maintenance and further extensions and vehicles are the responsibility of Hordaland County Municipality through its wholly owned subsidiary Bybanen AS. Operation is governed by public service obligation contracts issued by the county public transport authority Skyss. From 2010 to 2017 the line and its 20 Variobahn trams are operated by Keolis Norge (formerly Fjord1 Partner).

== History ==
=== Background ===
The first public transport in Bergen was the Bergen Tramway, which operated between 1897 and 1965. It was limited to the inner parts of the city and did not reach the suburbs. In deciding to close it, the city council argued that the future lay in private cars, diesel buses and trolleybuses. However, later in the 1960s, the removal of a restriction on car sales created more traffic than the roads could handle, and consequently both buses and cars began increasingly being stuck in rush-hour queues. The municipality and the Norwegian Public Roads Administration started looking at means to rectify the problem by building a ring road around the city, and by alternative means of public transport.

Prior to the shortening of the main Bergen Line railway with the Ulriken Tunnel, the Bergen–Nesttun Line was an important commuter rail service, feeding suburban residents from Fana into the city center. In 1917, the section was the most heavily trafficked railway in the country, with a travel time between 20 and 27 minutes. There were up to 27 trains per day, of which five continued to Garnes. In 1918, the line was proposed for doubling and electrification: the latter was completed in 1954. The same year, annual ridership had fallen to 870,000 passengers. After the opening of the Ulriken Tunnel, commuter trains were retained for six months, and the last trip occurred on 31 January 1965.

During the 1970s, plans existed for an extensive rapid transit system, with an underground section through the city center. Inspired by the successful Oslo Metro, which opened in 1966, similar plans were developed for Bergen. The proposed network consisted of three branches from the city center to Flaktveit, Olsvik, and the airport, and was similar to the current long-term plans for the light rail system. Four-car trains would operate at ten-minute headways. The suggestion was discussed by the city council in 1973, but no decision was taken. As an alternative, expansion of the railway from Bergen to Eidsvåg, Åsane, and Nesttun was proposed. Fast commuter trains could then be supplemented with buses.

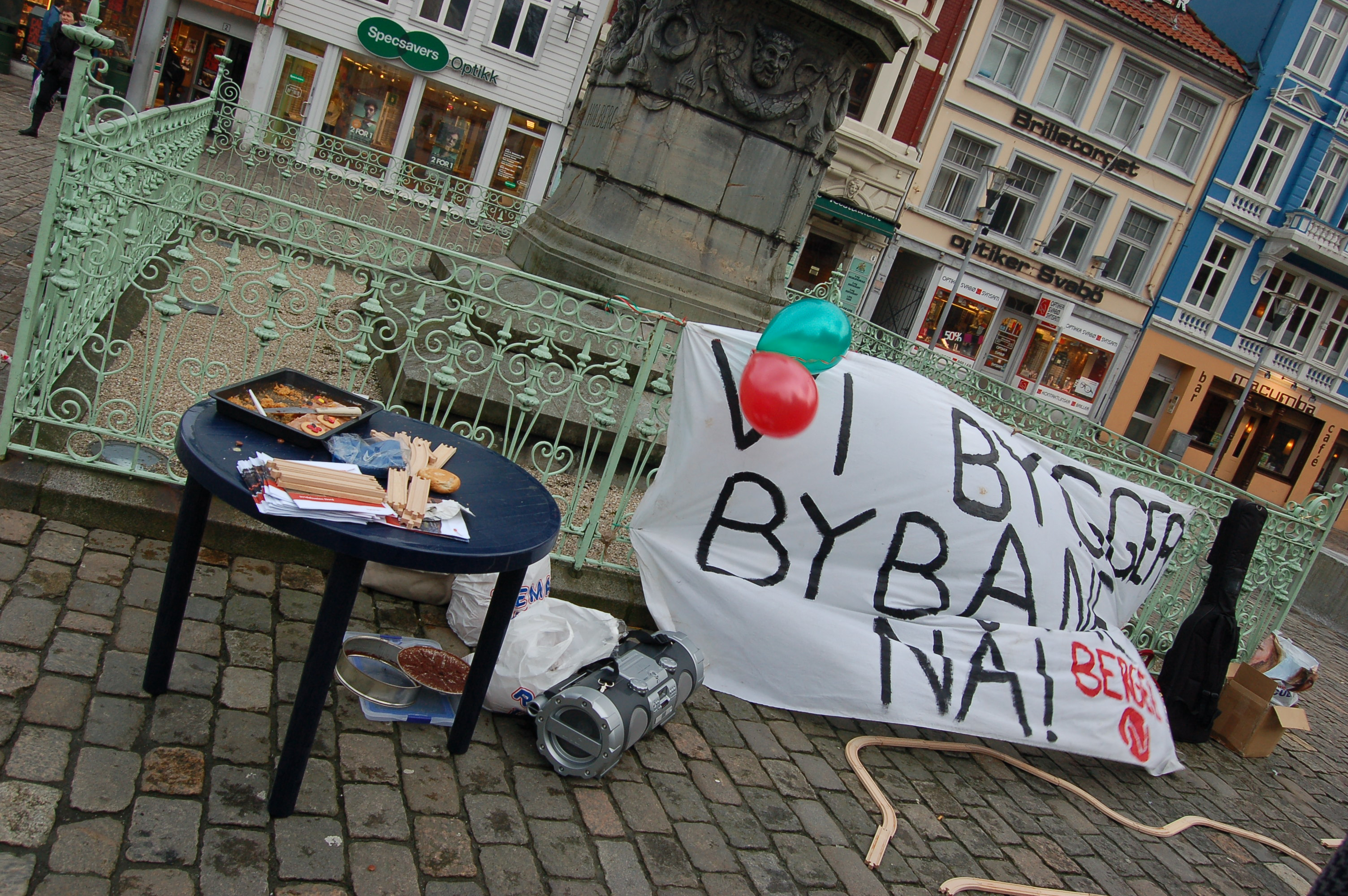
Demonstration by Natur og Ungdom in favor of light rail (2008)

During the 1980s and 1990s, a toll ring was constructed around Bergen to finance the massive investment required. The project included European Route E39 north and south of the center, the road to the airport, and west to Loddefjord and Storavatnet. Bridges were constructed to Lindås, Askøy and Sotra, and large parking garages were built in the city center. Despite the large investment, congestion continued, and it was no better in the 2000s than in the 1970s. Proposals to build bus lanes and traffic signal preemption were disregarded by the Public Roads Administration.

In 1995, Bergen Sporvei, the municipal transit company, proposal to establish a "Lightning Tram" service. The route would go from Varden in Fyllingsdalen, via a tunnel to Møhlenpris and the city center, then make a 120° turn and return along the route of the Bergen trolleybus to Birkelundstoppen. The same year, the Norwegian Society for the Conservation of Nature proposed a more extensive system, the Environmental Tram, which more closely resembles the current proposals. From the city center, it would run northwards via Åsane to Flaktveit and southwards via Rådal to the airport (not via Nesttun). The southern section would have branches from Hop to Nesttun and Midttun, and from Minde westwards to Fyllingsdalen and Loddefjord. Later, Bergen Sporvei's successor, Gaia Trafikk, proposed building a bus rapid transit system.

=== Political process ===
The plans launched by the city administration most closely resembled the Environmental Tram, with slight changes. The initial plans involved a line from the city center via Nesttun to the airport at Flesland. It became part of a political compromise, the Bergen Program, which ensured a number of road investments at the same time as the light rail system, all financed through the toll ring. However, a lack of funds made it necessary to build the line to Nesttun only, instead of all the way to the airport. The initial decision was taken by Bergen City Council on 13 March 2000, in the Parliament of Norway in 2002, and with the financing secured, by the city council in 2005. Only the Progress Party and the Pensioners' Party voted against light rail. Forty per cent is financed by the state, the remainder by the county, the municipality and through the toll ring.

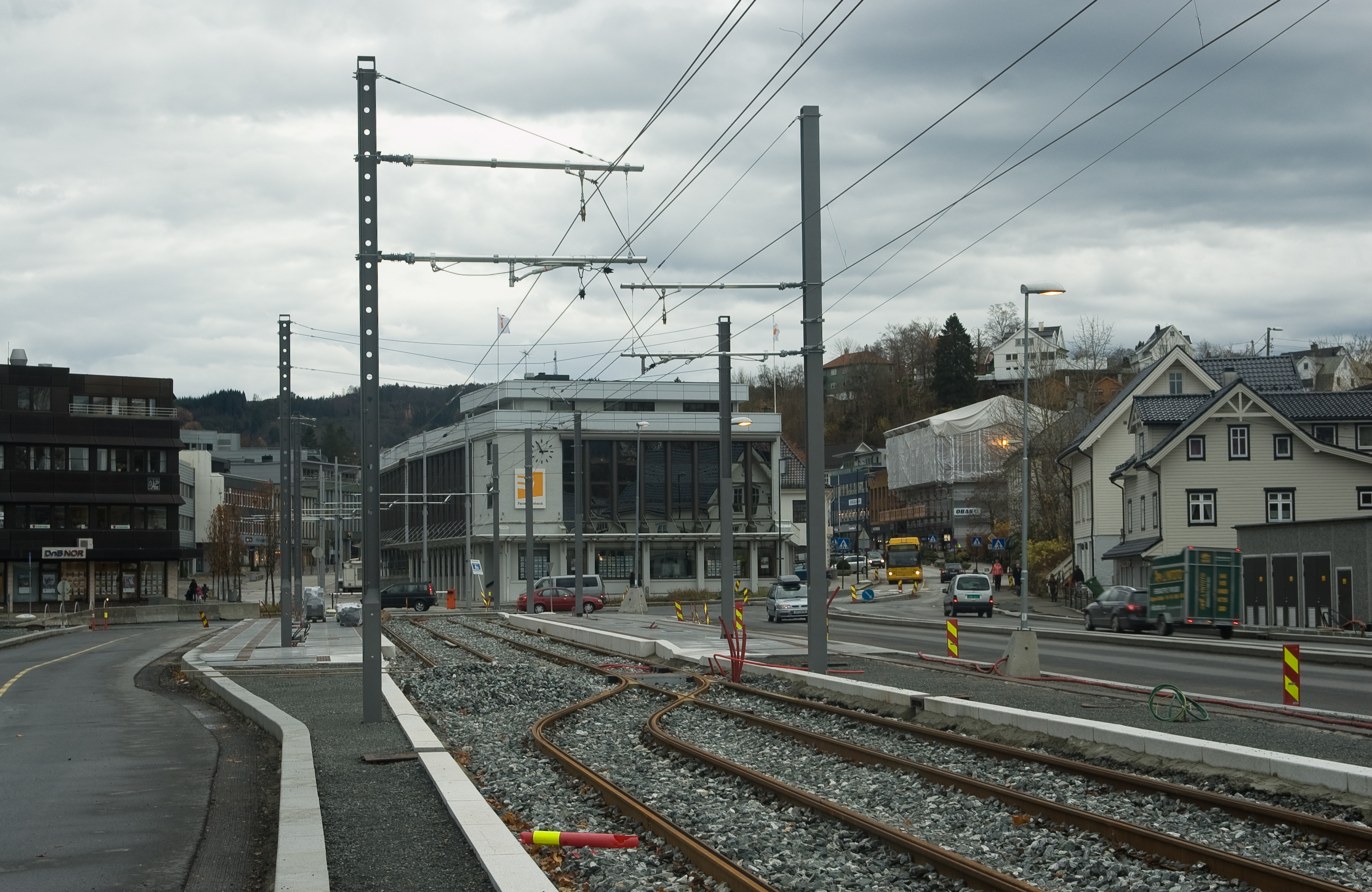
Construction at Nesttun Terminal

Arguments for light rail were mainly related to the environment, urban development and reduction in road congestion. Light rail was expected to increase the use of public transport from Fana, reducing both local and global pollution. The roads do not have capacity for further expansion, and any increase in public transport would need to be taken along the light rail routes using buses, which would mean higher operating costs for public transport or higher investment costs for roads. It was also argued that around stations, high-density commercial and residential centers could be established.

Opposition to the project argued it was unfair that public transport be funded by car drivers through tolls. Protests from people in northern and western areas of the city arose, since they would be paying for the system but would not receive any benefits. Another concern was speed: the line to Nesttun was designed with 15 stops in 10 kilometers (6.2 mi), giving an average speed of 28 km/h (17 mph). For people living south of Nesttun, this meant a longer travel time to the city center than with direct buses that do not make intermediate stops.

The naming of the stations also caused local debate. A draft list of names was compiled by the municipal administration and sent to the borough councils in Fana, Årstad and Bergenhus. Four names were changed: Nonneseteren from Jernbanen, Florida from Strømmen, Brann stadion from Nymark and Hop from Troldhaugen. Brann station and Troldhaugen were afterwards considered by the municipal administration, because they could be in violation of the Place Name Act. The general rule is to use the place name where the station is located, and naming after institutions or facilities nearby is not permitted unless they are in the immediate vicinity. Brann stadion, named for the football venue, was declared a borderline case, but within the rules, while Troldhaugen was not permitted because the area is not in the vicinity of the station.

=== Construction ===
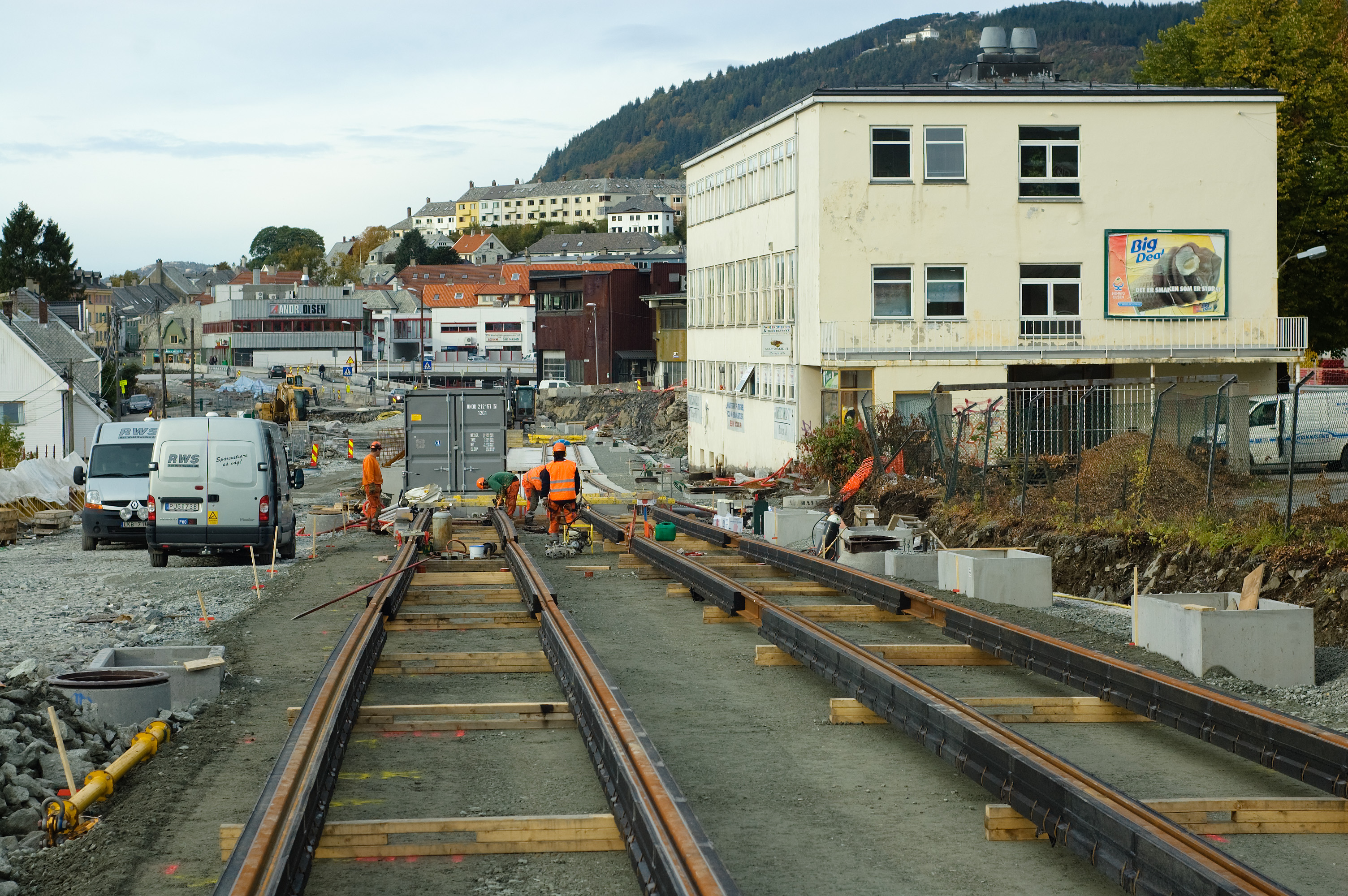
Construction near Kronstad during 2008

Initial works commenced in August 2007, when Pastasentralen, the central railway station, was demolished to make room for a temporary bus terminal that would allow Kaigaten to be closed for construction. Contracts for building the line were awarded to Svein Boasson, NCC Construction, Fyllingen Maskinstasjon and Veidekke Entreprenør. The contract for laying the tracks was awarded to Baneservice.

Construction started in January 2008. To pass over Strømmen, a fourth Nygård Bridge was built for cars, and the oldest was upgraded for use by the light rail line. In several places the road needed to be dug up to remove pipes and cables. In November 2009, Gulating Court of Appeal ruled that the power company BKK had to spend 80 million NOK to move power lines, and could not charge the costs to the project. By June 2008, the first tracks had been laid.

Four companies bid for the initial public service obligation to operate the line: Fjord1 Partner, Norges Statsbaner, Tide Bane and Veolia Transport Norge. On 3 April 2009, the public transport agency Skyss announced that Fjord1 Partner, a joint venture between Fjord1 AS and Keolis, had won the tender competition. Fjord1 Partner received 324 applications for their 26 jobs as drivers and 10 jobs as traffic controllers. In 2014 Fjord1 AS sold their shares in Fjord1 Partner to Keolis, and the company changed its name to Keolis Norge AS.

Along with the establishment of the light rail service, public transportation in Bergen underwent other changes. Skyss was established in 2007 to administer the public transport system, manage routes and market public transport, which would be operated by private companies based on public service obligations. At the same time, a new electronic ticketing system was introduced.

On 22 June 2010, the first part of the line was officially opened by Queen Sonja of Norway. Because of delays from Stadler's subcontractors, only five instead of eight trams were available when the line opened. Skyss had planned to operate with a ten-minute headway until August, but ran a 15-minute headway instead. To compensate, parallel bus routes continued to operate until then. On 7 June, two trams collided at low speed at Byparken, causing a derailment and the two trams had to be repaired. This caused the summer schedule to be reduced to a 30-minute headway. Beginning on 1 November 2010, the line started running every six minutes during the rush hour.

== Route ==
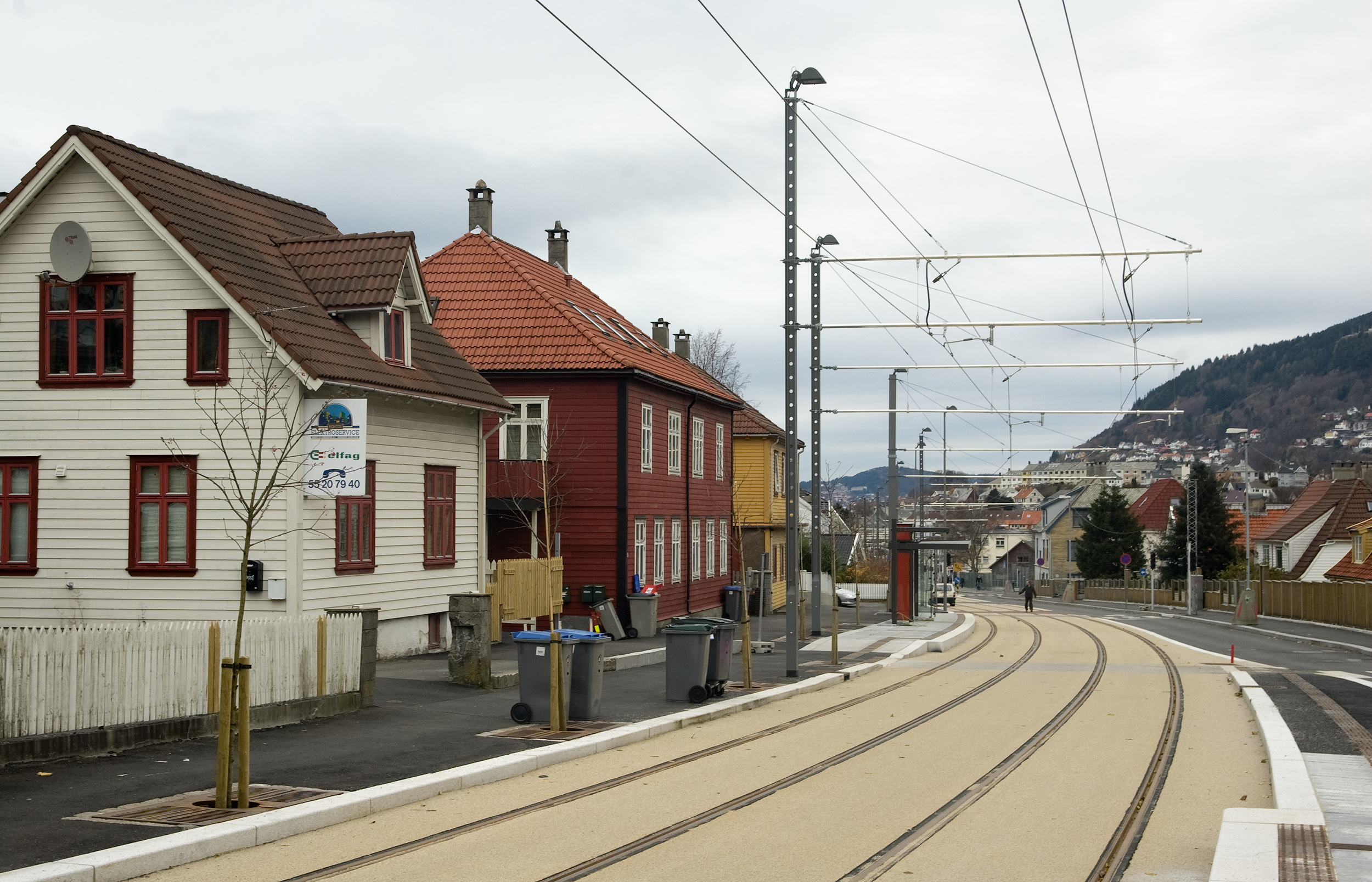
Brann stadion in Inndalsveien

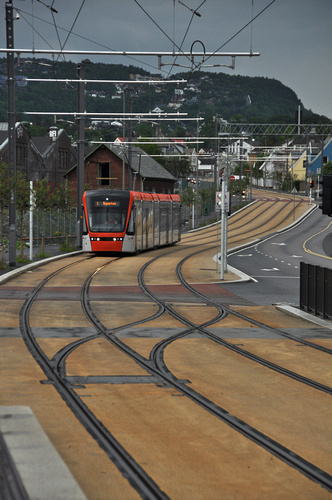
The light rail line along Inndalsveien

The first part of line number 1 is 9.8-kilometre (6.09 mi) and runs from the city center to Nesttun. The northernmost part of the line, the Byparken stop, is a transit mall at the heart of the city center and has interchange with all buses serving the city center. The line runs south along Kaigaten, with Nonneseter stop serving the railway station and Bergen Bus Station. Southwards, the line runs in a grass right-of-way through Nygård and Florida, serving the campus of the University of Bergen. The line passes over Nygård Bridge before coming to Danmarks plass, the only island platform on the system. In this area, the track is laid on maize, a type of surface that allows emergency vehicles to drive safely, but makes it look unsafe for cars.

Line 1 goes on to the Kronstad stop, almost at the door of the Bergen University College, where it meets line number 2, which has a different route from the city centre, passing under the hospital of Haukeland. From Kronstad, line 1 follows Inndalsveien, where the Brann Stadion stop serves the Brann football stadium. Wergeland is at the mouth of the 1.1-kilometer (0.68 mi) Fageråstunnelen, S-shaped with a 6.0% gradient and a curve radius of 150 meters (492 ft 2 in). From the southern portal the line changes to conventional railway track with ballast, allowing trams to operate at 80 km/h (50 mph). The next stops are Sletten, Slettebakken and Fantoft, the latter station serving a large complex of student dormitories. Southwards it runs in the 1.2-kilometer (0.75 mi) Fantoft Tunnel, followed by the Paradis stop. The line continues along the Nesttunvannet inlet to Hop, along the former right-of-way of Bergen's first motorway. Nesttun Terminal was the terminus between 2010 and 2013 until the extension to Lagunen was finished.

After the completion to Nesttun, the line was extended southwards to Rådal at Lagunen Storsenter. Construction began in January 2011, on its own right-of-way, parallel to the existing road; the track was completed in October 2012. The first test run to Lagunen was conducted on 6 December 2012, and the line opened to the public on 22 June 2013.

The light rail is connected from Lagunen via Sandsli and Kokstad to Bergen Airport, Flesland. Both Sørås and Indre Steinsvik had experienced rapid housing construction without a corresponding increase of public transport. Further out is a large corporate center with many of Bergen's largest employers, such as Telenor, Equinor and BKK. The area was built without sufficient roads or public transport. Building the light rail line to Flesland also greatly improved the access to the airport from the city, offering a reasonably priced service for locals and employees at the airport. Another incentive to build to Flesland was that there was sufficient available land at Kokstad which allowed a large maintenance depot to be constructed there. During the first years, there was a small depot at Kronstad, which had become too small after the second extension. The track between Lagunen and Birkelandsskiftet was officially opened on 15 August 2016. The last part of the track was awaiting the opening of the new terminal building of Bergen airport, as the stop is intertwined with the airport terminal. The official opening of the final part of line 1 took place on 21 April 2017.

Line 2 between Bergen city center and Fyllingsdalen was officially opened on 21 November 2022. Line 2 starts in Kaigaten, just across the intersection from the starting point of line 1. Lines 1 and 2 both stop at Nonneseter outside Bergen railway station, and continue to Bergen busstasjon, which line 2 stops behind. The two lines then depart, and line 2 runs on the eastern side of Store Lungegårdsvann to the Fløen stop. It continues into a tunnel and stops at a large underground station constructed beneath the hospital, with exits to both Haukeland University Hospital, Western Norway's largest work place, and Haraldsplass Diakonale Sykehus. The next stop after the tunnel is Kronstad, where line 2 intersects with line 1. It then continues over Mindemyren industrial area to Kristianborg, and through a 3 kilometer long tunnel to the Fyllingsdalen terminal.

== Plans ==
Plans for the expansion northwards from the city center to Åsane have not been conclusive, due to disagreements on which path to follow through the city center. The proposed construction along Bryggen was formally adopted by the city council of Bergen, but controverses and continuing debates on an alternative tunnel solution has paused the process. An important stop mid-way is the Norwegian School of Economics. The terminus will probably be Åsane Senter or Nyborg; the former shopping center has set aside areas for a station. At Åsane, a major bus terminal would allow connections to the northern parts of Bergen, suburbs further north and areas in Nordhordland. An important political argument for prioritizing this line is to share the investments and effects with all parts of the city.

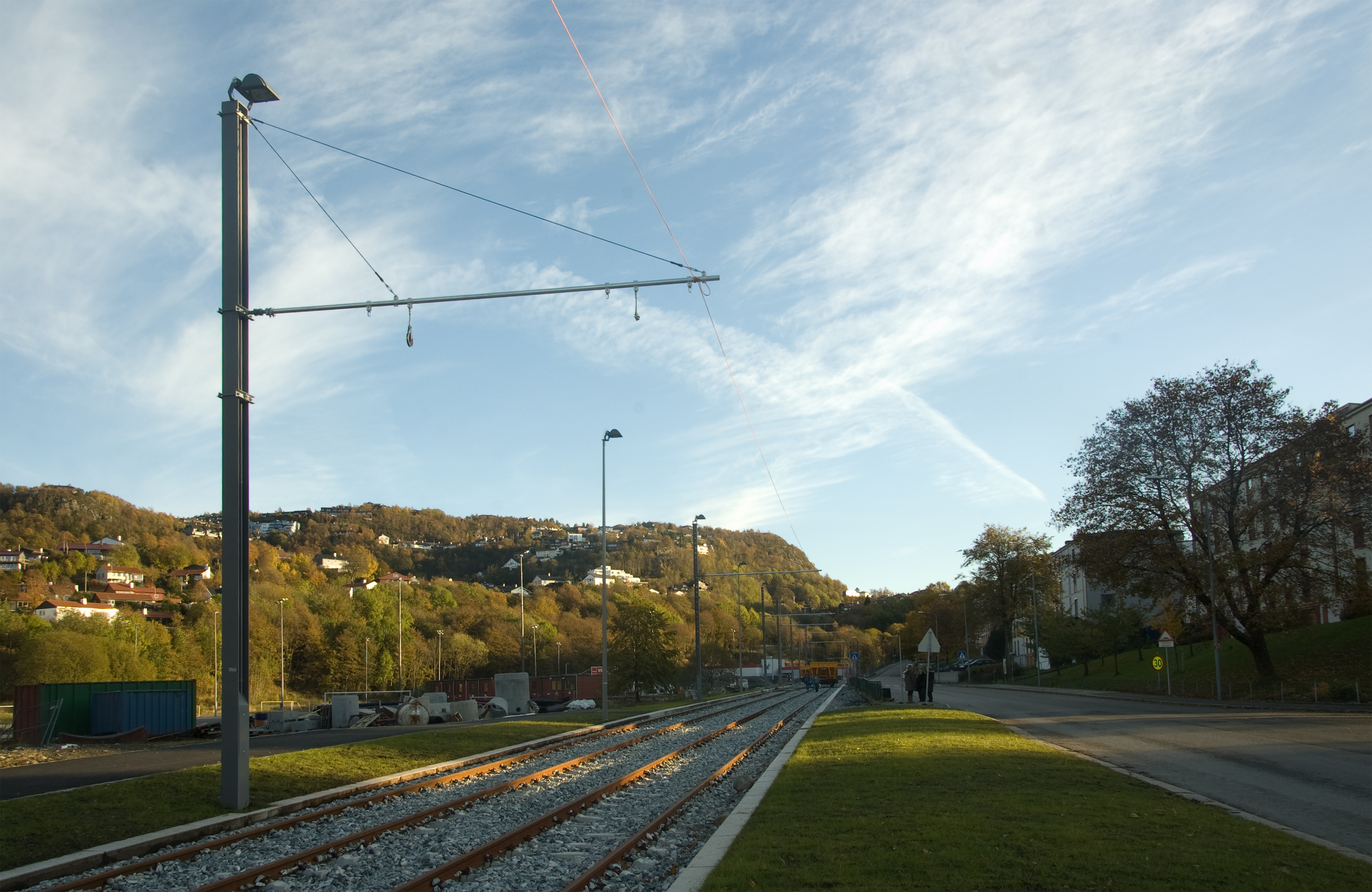
Slettebakken

Several politicians, including the majority in Hordaland County Council, have stated that in the long run they want the light rail line extended northwards to Knarvik and westwards to Straume and Kleppestø.

== Operation ==
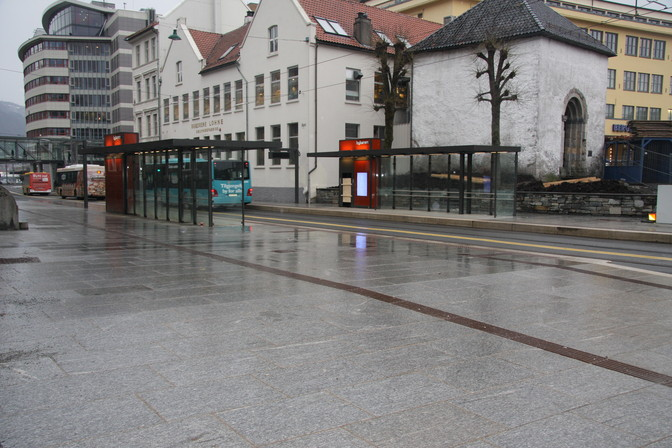
Nonneseteren station on the Bergen Light Rail

The building of the line is the responsibility of Bybanen Utbygging, which is a unit in Vestland County Council. Due to the present pause in the construction process, Bybanen Utbygging will be reduced in size in 2024. The physical infrastructure and trams are owned by Bybanen AS, a limited company wholly owned by Vestland County Council. This company is responsible for the maintenance of the right-of-way and the vehicles, and for extensions. Light rail operations are based on contracts granted after public tender competitions held by Bybanen AS. The time tables are decided by Skyss, another unit in Vestland County Council that administers all public transport in Vestland, including buses, boats and ferries. The light rail operation is currently handled by Tide Buss og Bane AS. Stadler has the responsibility for maintenance of the trams for the first seven years, as part of the purchase contract.

The line is operated on a four/five-minute headway by all-stops trams, with an eight-minute headway in off-peak times and a 20-minute headway at night. The travel time from Byparken to Bergen airport is 44 minutes. In 2024, the full price of a single ticket is NOK 44. The tickets are part of the same ticketing system as the buses in Bergen and Vestland.

== Rolling stock ==
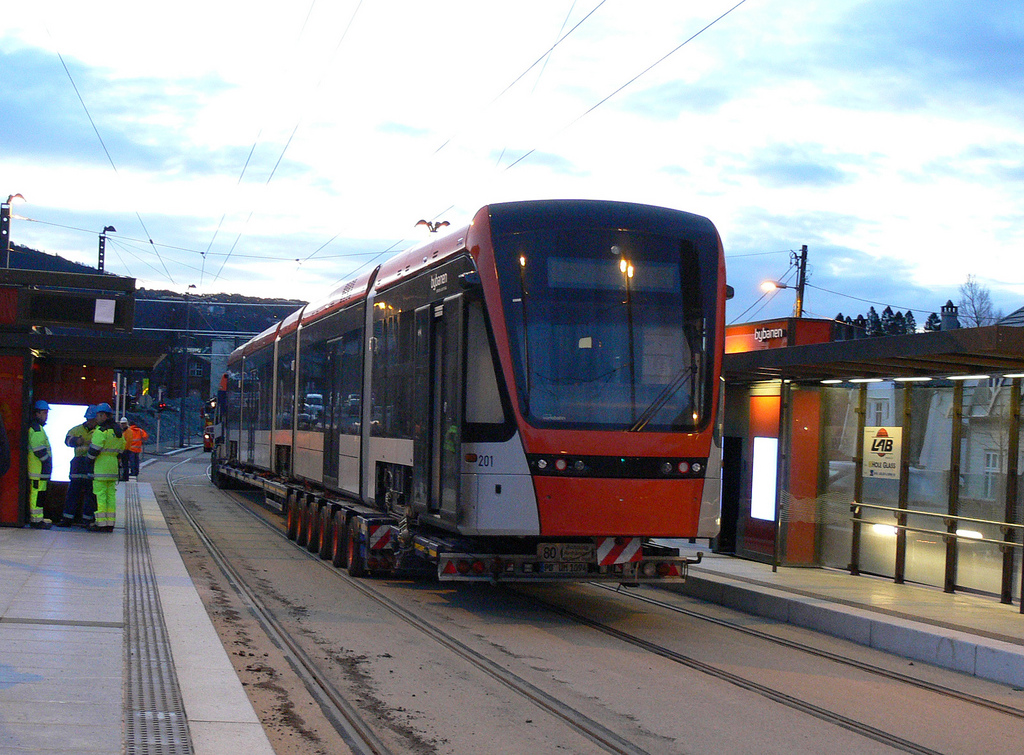
Tram 201 being delivered at Kronstad on 8 December 2009, the morning after it arrived in Bergen

In 2007, the Planning Office ordered 12 Variobahn trams from Stadler Rail, with an additional four on option. The first tram arrived on 7 December 2009, and was used for testing in the months leading up to the opening. Before the opening, five more trams were in place. The first trams were 32.180 m (105 ft 6.9 in) long and 2.65 meters (8 ft 8 in) wide, weighing 35.7 tonnes (35.1 long tons; 39.4 short tons). They had five articulated sections, and were expandable with another two modules to a length of 42 meters (137 ft 10 in). The early vehicles got extended, and the first 42-meter tram was put in traffic on 4 August 2016. During the following year, all trams were extended to 42 meters, and from then, all new trams are 42 meters at time of purchase. All stations are built for extended trams.

There is a slightly elevated driver's cab at each end. Eight motors provide a total of 360 kW (480 hp) for three bogies. This allows a maximum speed of 70 km/h (43 mph), limited to 50 km/h (31 mph) in city streets and 25 km/h (16 mph) in the depots. Acceleration is 1.25 m/s/s (2.8 mph/s), and they are capable of operating on a 7.0% gradient. Current is collected via a pantograph, at 750 volts direct current. Each tram is sufficiently powerful to haul another unit in case of emergencies.

Maximum capacity is 280 passengers. The entire tram is step-free, including between the cars and the platforms. Seats are designed for travel times up to 60 minutes. There are five slide and plug doors on each side; three are double, with a total width of 1,300-millimeter (4 ft 3 in), while the last is a single 800-millimeter (2 ft 7 in) door. Stop buttons are only available at the doors, but the trams always stop at all stops. Between the seats there is a minimum width of 720 mm (2 ft 4 in), which allows wheelchair and buggy access along the full length of the car. All stations are announced visually and orally. The trams have wireless Internet access. However, it is reserved for the onboard Infotainment system.

All stations are announced with a short distinctive melody and the station's name. The melodies for the stops between Byparken and Nesttun were composed by Snorre Valen, while the voice was recorded by Heidi Lambach.

Currently there are 34 Variobahn trams in operation.

== Infrastructure ==
The system is standard gauge with 2.65-meter (8 ft 8 in)-wide cars, with the platforms built to allow 44-meter (144 ft 4 in) long trams. The line has no terminal balloon loops, so trams must be bi-directional. The current is supplied from six rectifiers, specified so the system can operate with two rectifiers out of service. In the city center the overhead wire has been designed to minimize the number of poles, while in the suburban areas a conventional system has a carrier wire above the power wire.

The line is double track, allowing visual signaling and speed adjustment on all at-grade stretches. In city streets S60 track is used; on private right-of-way, S49 track. The minimum curve radius is 25 metres (82 ft 0 in) and tracks in city streets are laid within a rubber jacket to reduce noise. In the tunnels, only one tram can operate in each direction; this is regulated by lights and an automatic Train Protection system. Signaling uses the German BOStrab system, not traditional Norwegian light signals. The line has traffic signal preemption, so the trams send a signal to the traffic light control when the driver starts the door-closing signal to give the tram priority at traffic lights.

The depot is at Kronstad, at a former yard used by the Norwegian State Railways, where a track that connects the light rail network to the Bergen Line. The depot was finished in 2009, and has room for 16 40-meter (131 ft 3 in) trams plus a workshop with space for two trams and a garage with place for three. There is sufficient area for further expansion, but tracks have not been laid. When the light rail line is expanded to Flesland, a new main depot is planned in an area with cheaper land, and Kronstad depot will be converted to a pure overnighting facility.

=== Stations ===
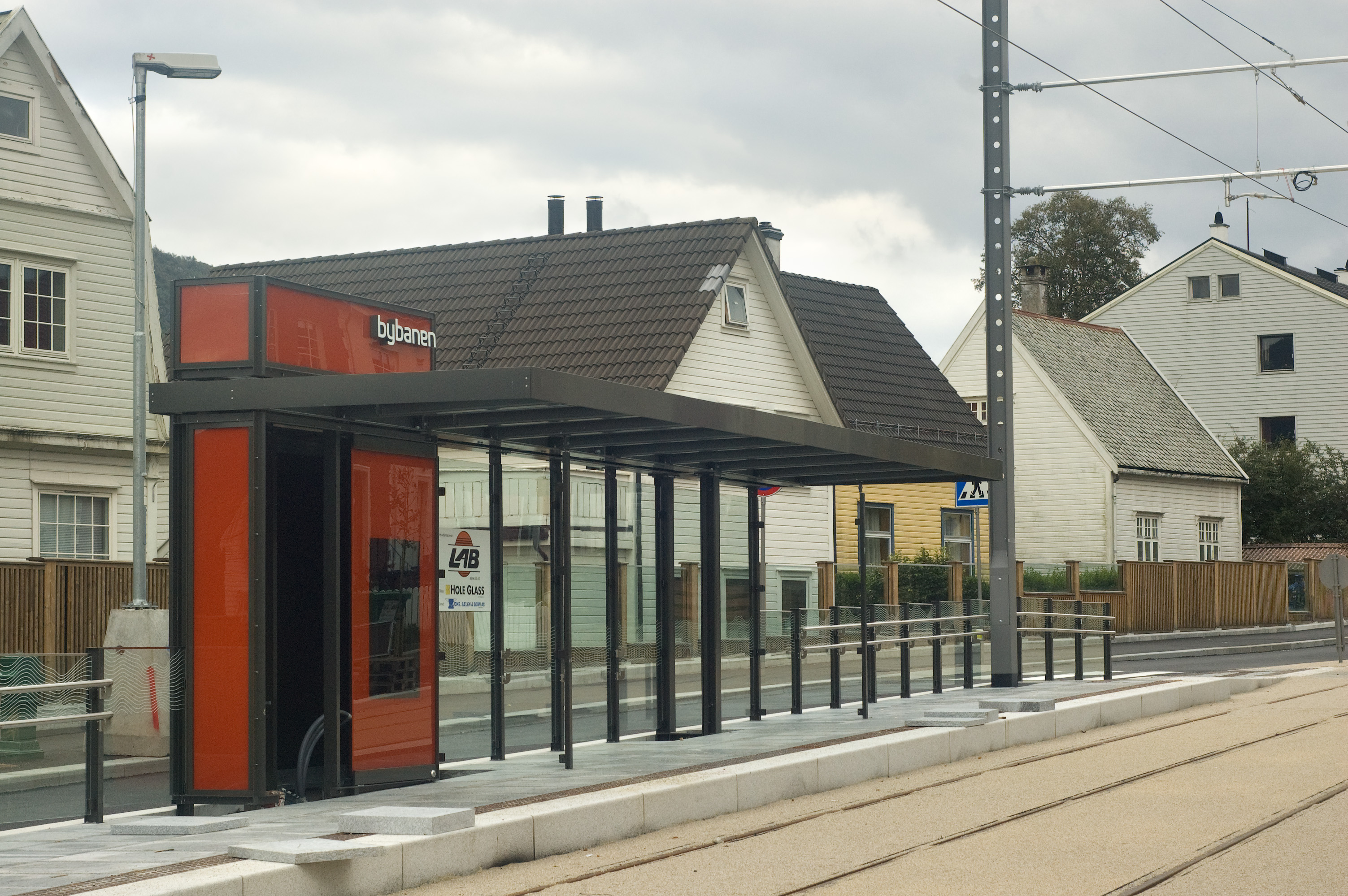
The station Brann Stadion

As of 2024, there are 35 stops along the two lines. The stations and the visual profile of the system as a whole were designed by the Bergen-based design groups Cubus and Fuggi Baggi Design, and Copenhagen-based Kontrapunkt. Most of the stations are at street level, and have facilities for buying tickets and feature dynamic displays that show when the next tram will arrive. The platforms have step-free access to the trams, allowing unhindered accessibility by wheelchairs and perambulators.

The municipal government has encouraged (through planning permission) denser development around the stations, where it wants most new housing and commercial property to be built. Development projects for Slettebakken, Wergeland, Paradis, Lagunen, Sandsli, Kokstad and Mindemyren have been announced by private developers. Many of the stations are in primarily residential areas, and projects have met resistance from residents who fear that the character of their neighborhoods will be altered.
