= Fjordservice =

Norwegian ferry company (1990–2008)

Fjordservice AS is a defunct passenger ferry company that operated routes from Stavanger to Ryfylke in Rogaland county, Norway. It operated from 1990 until 2008. The routes operated were Stavanger–Mekjarvik–Kvitsøy, Stavanger–Usken–Hommersåk, and Stavanger–Byøyene.

The company was founded in 1990 and started with ferry routes; it was later bought by Rogaland Trafikkselskap (later Stavangerske) and L. Rødne og Sønner. Rogaland Trafikkselskap then bought out Rødne, and in 2008, Stavangerske, Fjordservice and Tide merged.
