= Keolis Norge =

Norwegian bus and light rail operator

Keolis Norge AS

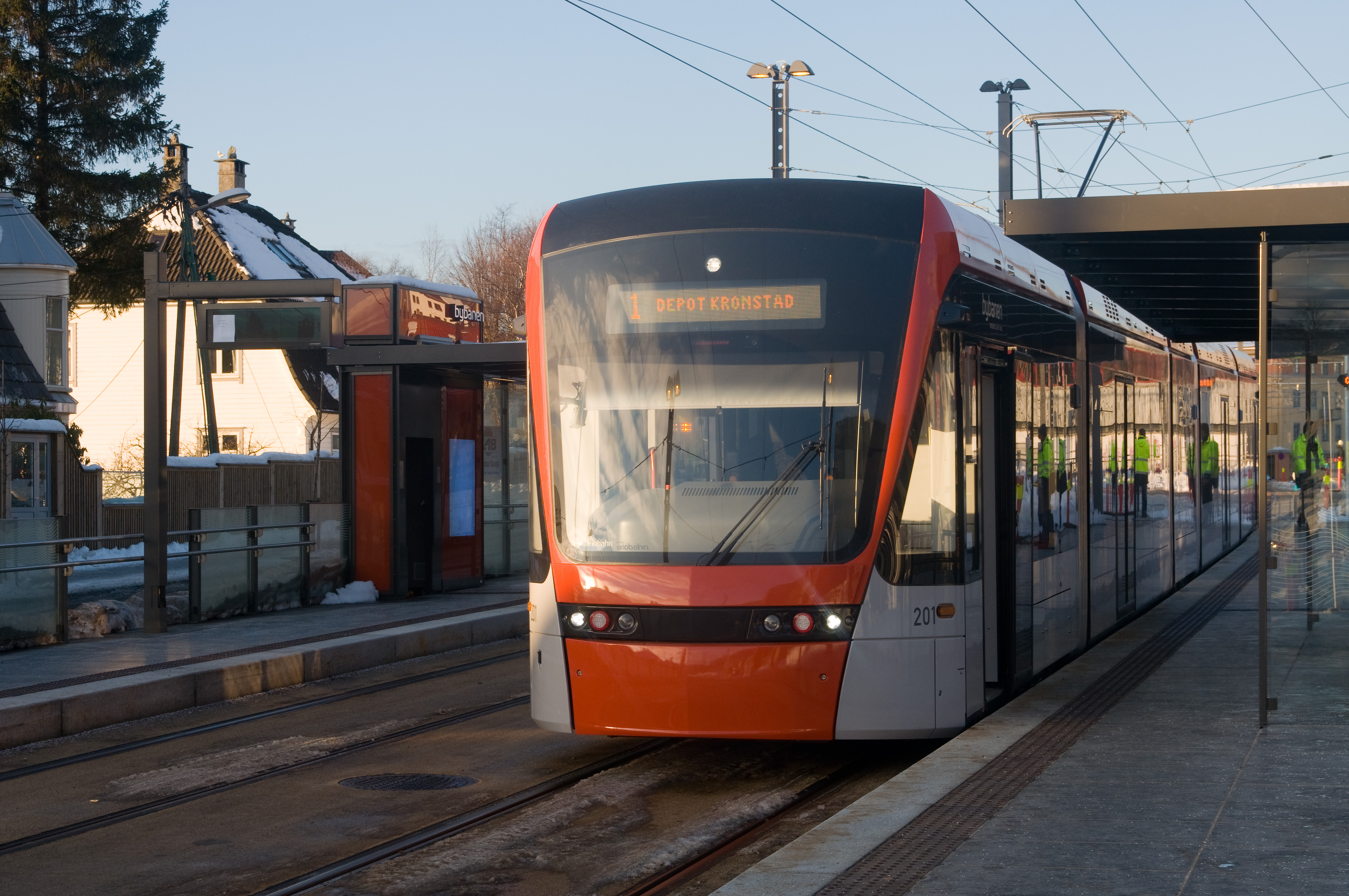
- Bergen Light Rail, operated by Keolis Norge.
- Formerly: Fjord1 Partner AS
- Type: Aksjeselskap
- Industry: Public transport
- Founded: Bergen, Norway (29 August 2008; 18 years ago)
- Headquarters: Bergen, Norway
- Key people: Øystein Gullaksen (MD); Wenche Kjølås (Chair)
- Services: Public transport; Light rail operation; Public transport bus service
- Number of employees: 188 (2026)
- Parent: Keolis Nordic AB
- Website: keolis.no

Keolis Norge is the Norwegian subsidiary of Keolis, holding the contract to operate the Bergen Light Rail and the Bergen Sentrum bus contract for Skyss.

== History ==
The company was established in 2008 as Fjord1 Partner AS, a joint venture between Fjord1 Nordvestlandske (49%) and Keolis Nordic AB (51%), a Keolis holding company for its Nordic operations, with the goal of bidding for the Bergen Light Rail contract and other PSO contracts for bus transport in the Bergen area.

The contract was announced on 2 April 2009, after Fjord1 Partner had beaten NSB, Tide Bane (Tide with HTM Personenvervoer) and Veolia Transport Bane for the contract. The infrastructure and the Variobahn vehicles are owned by Vestland Fylkeskommune, while the operation subsidies are managed by Skyss, a county agency responsible for all public transport subsidies in Vestland.

In 2014, Fjord1 sold their shares to Keolis, and the company changed its name to Keolis Norge AS.

In June 2019, the company was awarded the tender for driving buses in the route area Bergen Sentrum, starting on 1 December 2020. This includes driving amongst other vehicles 112 electric buses, of which 102 battery buses from Yutong and ten trolley buses from Solaris.

On September 6, 2022, DSD AS, the owner of Tide Buss, announced they would buy out all shares and take over the running of all their contracts, leaving Keolis Norge defunct.
