= Stavangerske =

Norwegian ferry company

Stavangerske AS
- Type: Subsidiary
- Industry: Shipping
- Founded: 1990
- Headquarters: Stavanger, Norway,
- Area served: Rogaland, Norway
- Key people: Egil Nylund (CEO)
- Products: Ferries
- Parent: Det Stavangerske Dampskibsselskap
- Website: www.stavangerske.no

Stavangerske is a defunct Norwegian ferry operator based in Stavanger. A subsidiary of Det Stavangerske Dampskibsselskap (DSD), it operates car- and passenger ferries primarily in Rogaland county. The company's ferries with less than 100 seats are operated by Fjordservice. It merged with Tide in 2007.

== History ==
Stavangerske was created in 1990 as Rogaland Trafikkselskap to operate the domestic ferries of DSD. At the time the company had licences to operate all but one ferry in Rogaland. In 2002 Rogaland County Council created Kolumbus and it started a process with public service obligation contracts being awarded, resulting in Stavangerske losing contracts to Torghatten Trafikkselskap, L. Rødne og Sønner and Fjord1. The company changed its name in 2003.

== Routes ==
Car ferry routes as of 2007:

- Stavanger-Tau
- Lauvvik-Oanes
- Hjelmeland-Nesvik-Ombo
- Hanasand-Judaberg-Nedstrand-Jelsa
- Sand-Ropeid
- Mekjarvik-Kvitsøy-Skudeneshavn

Catemaran routes:

- Stavanger - Kvitsøy
- Stavanger - Strand - Finnøy
- Stavanger - Sand - Sauda
- Stavanger - Haugesund

Local routes:

- Stavanger - Lysebotn
- Stavanger - Fister
