= Skansen Tunnel =

The Skansen Tunnel (Skansentunnelen) may refer to:

- Skansen Tunnel (Trondheim)
- Skansen Tunnel (Bergen)
