= Bergen Tramway =

Defunct tram network in Bergen, Norway

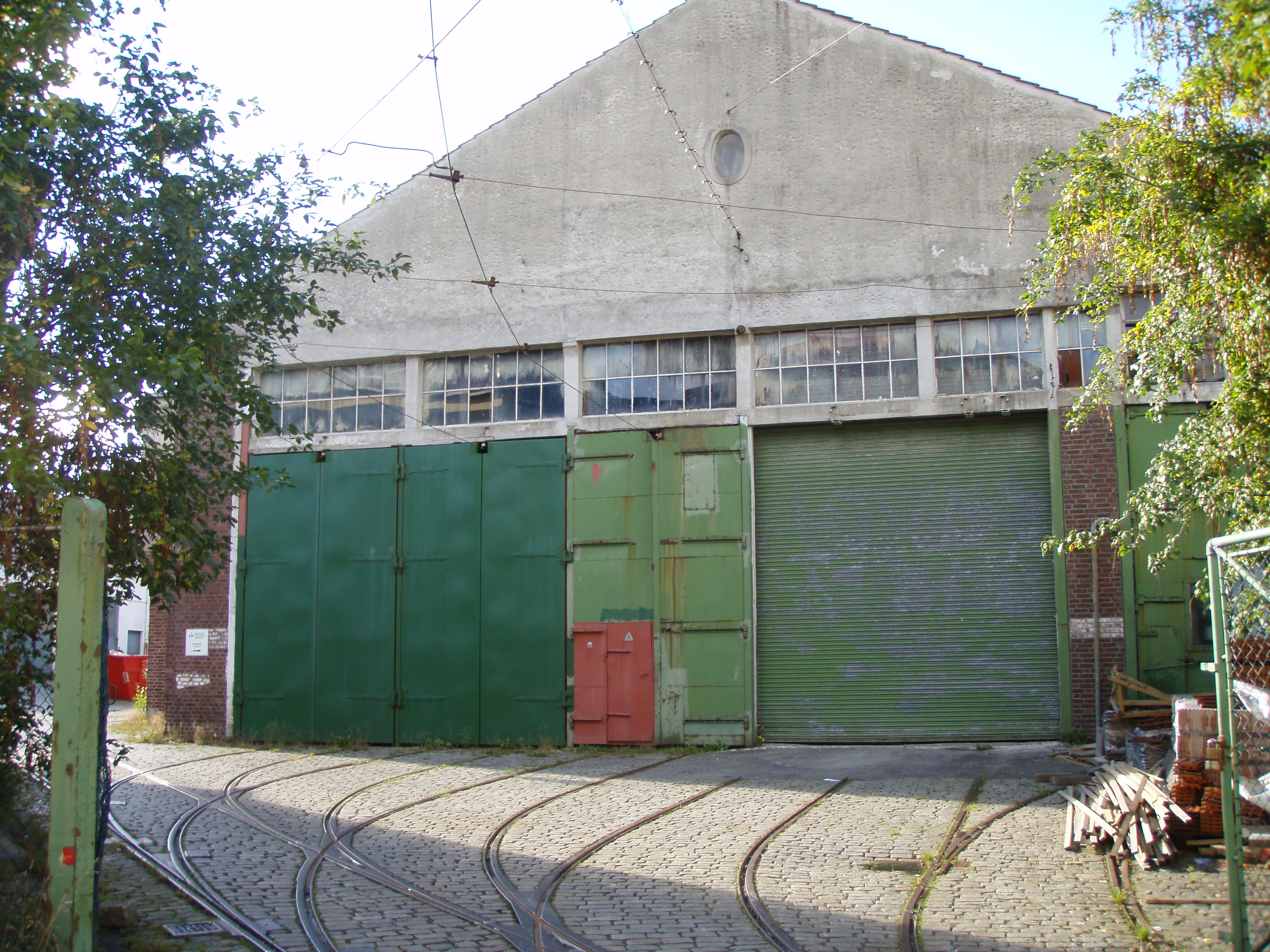
- The tram depot at Møhlenpris, now housing the technical museum.

Overview
- Locale: Bergen, Norway
- Transit type: Tramway
- Number of lines: 5

Operation
- Began operation: 29 June 1897
- Ended operation: 31 December 1964
- Operator: Bergen Sporvei

Technical
- Track gauge: 1,435 mm (4 ft 8 1/2 in)

Bergen Tramway (Trikken i Bergen) was a tram in Bergen, Norway. It was in operation from 1897 to 1965. The first three lines were opened on 29 June 1897. Starting in 1950, tramway lines were gradually replaced with bus and trolleybus routes. The last line closed in 1965. Since 1993, a heritage tram is operated in Møhlenpris by the Bergen's Electric Tramway association. A light rail system was proposed in 1995, adopted in the 2000s and started operating in 2010.

== History ==
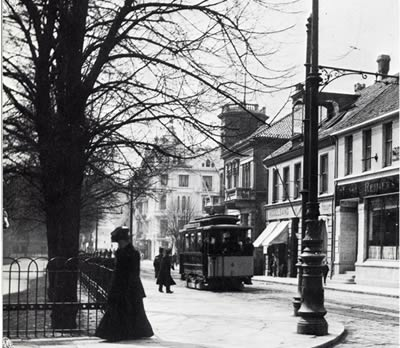
A tram in the early 1900s in Olav Kyrres gate.

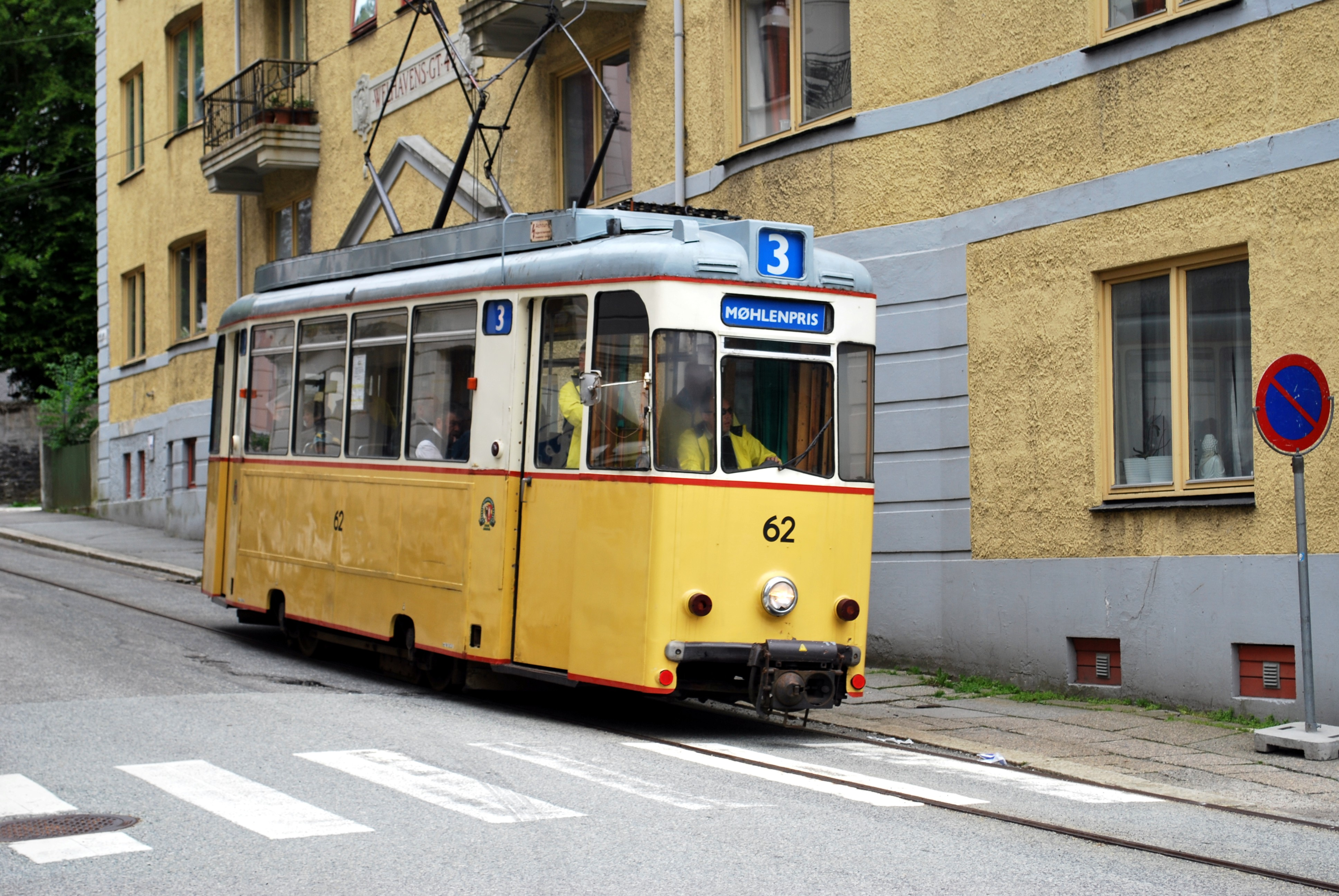
A tram on the heritage line at Møhlenpris, May 2009

In 1882, a horse coach service for Bergen was proposed; it started operating in 1893. This mode of transportation did not gain much success, and ceased a few years later. The construction of a tramway was decided in 1894, and started one year later, with the German company Union-Elektricitäts-Gesellschaft (UEG, later AEG) as the major shareholder.

The tramway opened on 29 June 1897, and was operated by the newly established Bergens Elektriske Sporvei. In the beginning, three lines ran through the city centre; from Bradbenken to Sukkerhusbryggen over Torget; from Småstrandgaten to Nygårdsbroen; and from Småstrandgaten to Kalfaret.

In 1898, the route from Nygårdsbroen merged with the route to Sandviken. Later, the line from Kalfaret to Småstrandgaten merged with line to Sukkerhusbryggen. In 1901, the branch line from the Sandviken line closed, the first tram closure in Norway. In 1910, the line to Sukkerhusbryggen closed. In 1911 the line to Møhlenpris opened; Nordnes had a new line five years later, extended to Bergen Railway Station in the 1920s. There were plans to create an interchange between the tramway and the Fløibanen funicular with a tram stop, but this did not happen.

The Bergen city fire in 1916 had a positive impact on the tramway. Large areas of the city centre burned to ashes and made space for additional lines, double track and more spacious tram stops. However, many of the tram depots burned down.

In 1916, shipowner Håkon J. Wallem purchased AEG's share of the tram company. He let the municipality of Bergen take over the tramway, and from September 1917 the public-owned company Bergen Sporvei operated the trams.

Many lines were extended during the 1920s, (Note: For a route map of the tram lines, see Bergen Byleksikon, p. 468 and this online map) and in 1932 the tramway reached its largest extent. In the 1930s many tram lines were replaced and supplemented with bus routes run by Bergens Sporvei. The buses' share of the Bergen traffic grew larger during the 1950s and 1960s, and in December 1963 the Bergen City Council decided to close the tramway. The last tram traveled to Møhlen 31 December 1964. All the trams except one were scrapped and lowered into Puddefjorden.

In 1974, The "Association for the Technical Museum in Bergen" was established, aiming at running a heritage tram on the tracks of the former tramway. In 1991, a rental agreement of the tram depot at Møhlenpris was put in place, and in 1993 the first tram ran. The line is now served with five trams; the one not scrapped in 1965, one from the Oslo Tramway painted yellow (pictured), and three from Berlin, built in 1969.

In 1995, it was decided that a light rail line from the city centre to Bergen Airport, Flesland would be constructed. The Bergen Light Rail started operating in 2010, with Variotrams from Stadler Rail from Nesttun to the city centre, extended to Rådal in August 2010.

== Lines ==
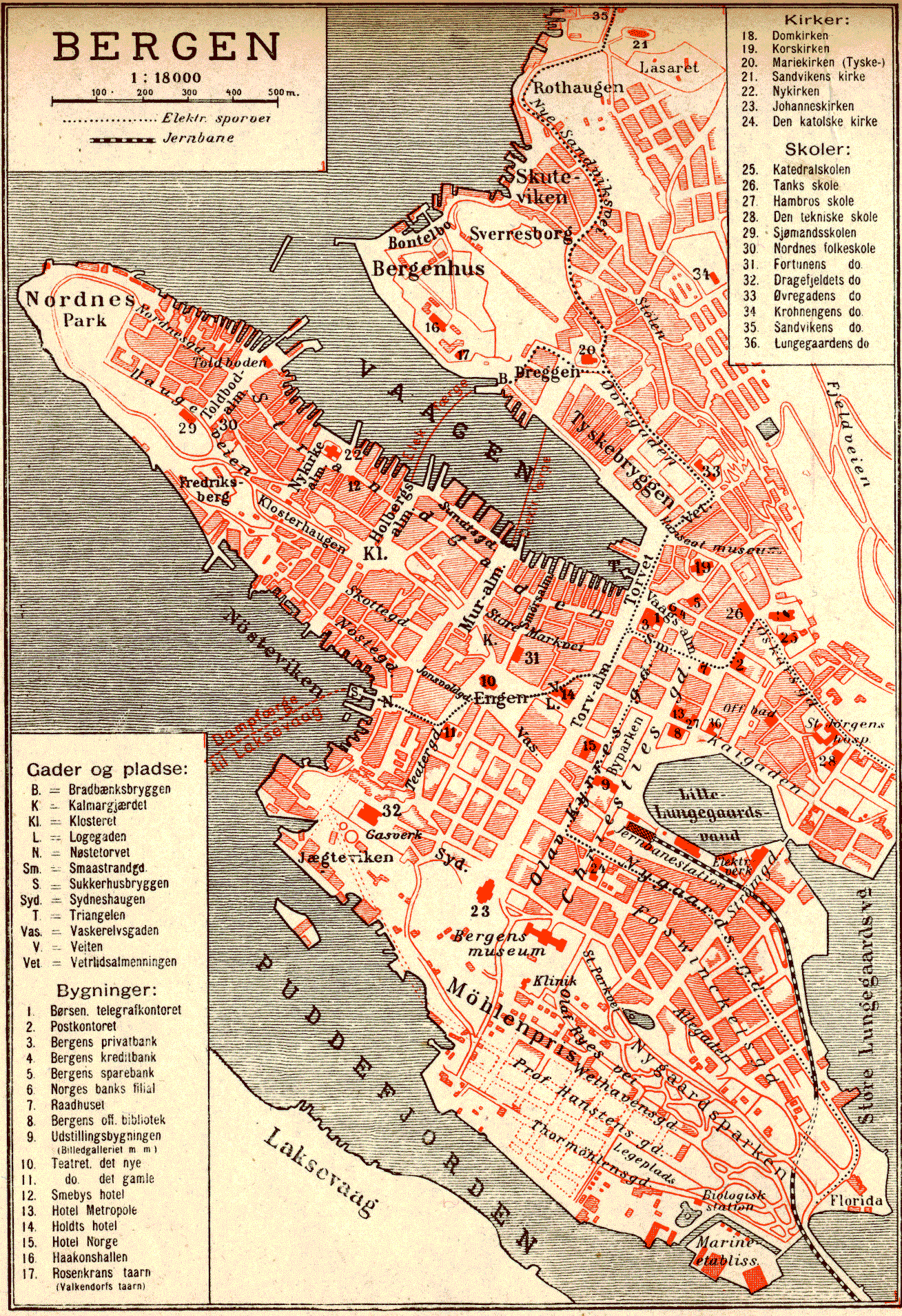
A map from 1907 with the tram routes included.

In the start, trams used different colours on the front light rather than route numbers. Route numbers started in 1923, which is why the line between Sukkerhusbryggen and Bradbenken never had a route number.

=== Line 1 ===
The Line between Småstrandgaten and Nygårdsbroen opened on 3 July 1897, between Sukkerhusbryggen and Sandviken 27 days later. On 21 February 1898, the lines were merged. In 1905, the line was extended north from Sandvikskirken to Sandvikstorget, in 1911 to the north end of the Reeperbahn and in 1928 to Munkebott gate. In 1947, in association with the introduction of one-way trams, turning loops were built in Sandviken. In the south, the line was extended in 1919 over the Nygård Bridge to the former railway station in Solheimsviken, in 1924 to Inndalen and in 1928 to the balloon loop at Minde. Double tracking was completed by 1938. Line 1a went from line 2's new turning loop at Engen to Minde: when the line to Sandviken closed in 1961 this became line 1. The line was replaced by buses in 1965.

=== Line 2 ===
The line between Småstrandgaten and Kalfaret opened on 3 July 1897, in 1898 extended to Olav Kyrres gate, and to Sukkerhusbryggen in 1900. In 1910, the line to Sukkerhusbryggen closed and line 2 served Småstrandgaten only. In 1911, the line was extended to Møhlenpris, and in 1912 to Haukeland University Hospital. In 1919 the line was split: the line to Møhlenpris later became line 3, and the terminus for the line to Haukeland was moved to Torgallmenningen. In 1922 this line was moved to C. Sundts street. In 1950, the terminus was replaced by a balloon loop at Engen. At the opposite end, the line was extended to a loop at Fridalen in 1924. Apart from a minor branch to the city centre, the line was not double track before 1922. Line 2a was created in 1943 from Nordnes to Fridalen, in connection with the closing of line 4, but ran for only a year. 1 December 1957, the line was replaced by trolleybuses, later extended to Birkelundstoppen, and is Norway's only trolleybus line.

=== Line 3 ===
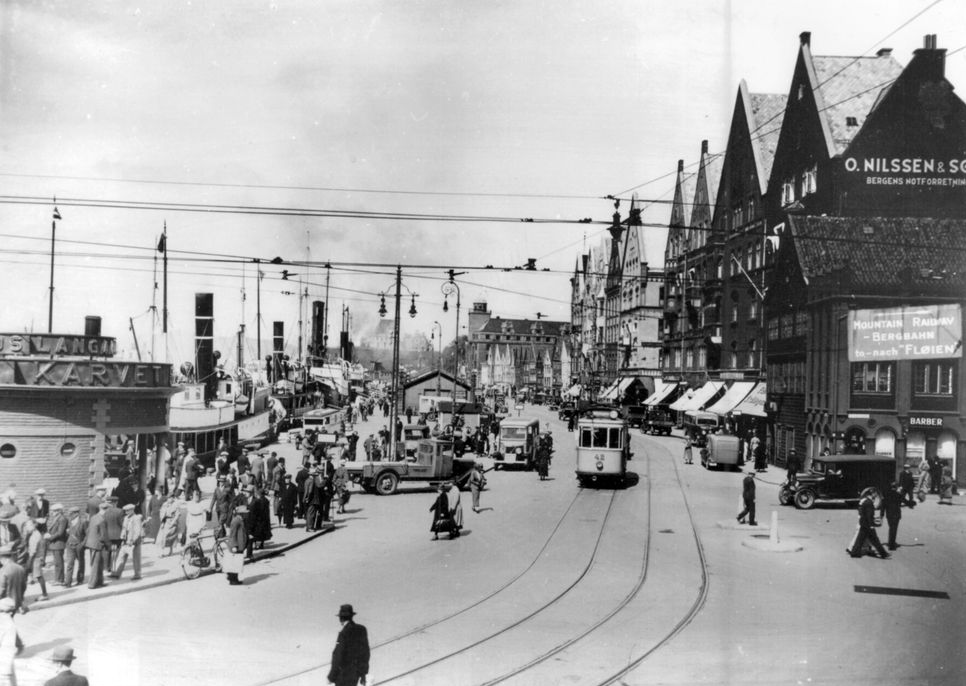
The tram line over Bryggen

The line between Møhlenpris and Torgallmenningen was created when line 2 was split in 1919. After some time, the city centre terminus was moved to Ole Bulls plass. After numerous changes, in 1923 it was extended to Tyskebryggen ("the German Dock"). In 1950, the line was replaced by Bergen's first trolleybus line, which ran along through the new street from Dokken to Nøstet, not along the tram line from Møhlenpris over Nygårdshøyden to the city centre. It continued to Bryggen and Mulen, where it replaced the bus route from Nøstet to Mulen. This bus section was replaced by diesel bus in 1994 as it was started to build a western approach and split into two different lines, 5 Mulen-Solheimslien and 11 Møhlenpris-Nygårdshøyden-Starefossen. In connection with another restructuring the line 11 had its route changed to Nordnes instead of Møhlenpris, and Southern Møhlenpris lost its bus connection in 2000. The stretch between Møhlenpris and Engen is still in operation as a museum tram.

=== Line 4 ===
The line from Torgallmenningen to Nordnes was started in 1915, primarily as a separate route but was sometimes also used to increase capacity on lines 1 and 2. Line 4 was influenced the most by reconstruction after the city fire in 1916. After numerous relocations the terminus was moved to the intersection between Strandgaten and Chr. Michelsens gate. In 1924, the line was extended to the railway station. However, it closed in 1926, mostly because of strike and also because of poor demand. In 1943, the line closed as a separate line, replaced to Nordnes by line 2a, which continued to Fridalen. In October 1944 line 2a and the Nordnes line closed. Since 1945 this part has been served by bus, and since 2000 by line 11 Nordnes-Starefossen.

=== Sukkerhusbryggen–Bradbenken ===
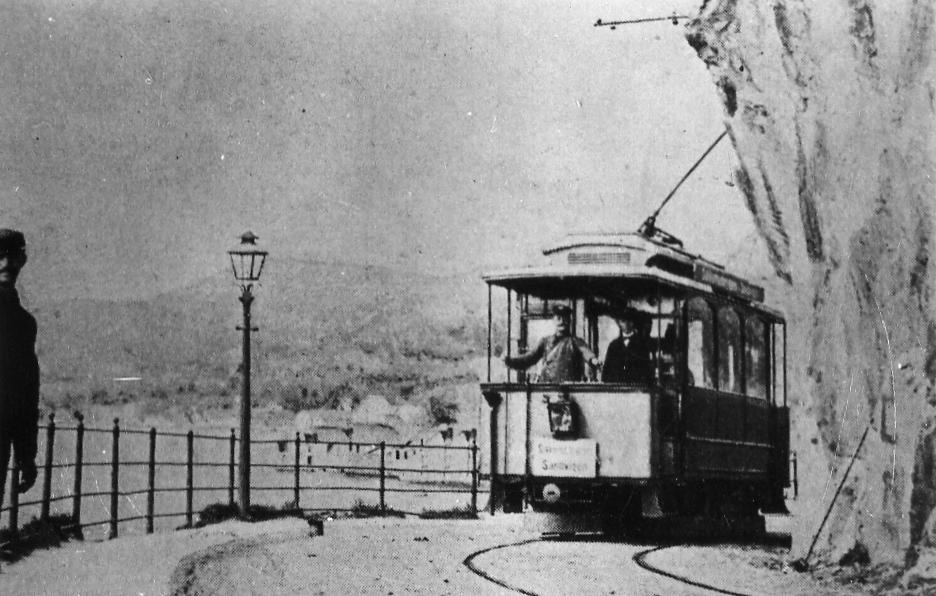
A tram at Sandviken in the early 1900s

The line between Sukkerhusbryggen and Bradbenken opened on 3 July 1897. However, demand was poor. In 1900, the section between Sukkerhusbryggen and Engen was replaced by the line to Kalfaret, and at the opposite end the tram was replaced by another between Mariakirken and Bradbenken. This was actually a beside track to the Sandviken Line. Demand was also poor here. Since the Sandviken Line's tracks were in Øvregaten, it often took more time to take the tram from Torget to Bradbenken than to walk. It was therefore closed the same year. The intersection between Engen and Sukkerhusbryggen was served by the Line 2 until it closed in 1910.

=== Heritage line ===
Bergen's Electric Tramway (Norwegian: Bergens Elektriske Sporvei) has, since the 1990s, maintained the remaining overhead wires and tracks, bought and laid new rails from the Trondheim Tramway, and new trams from East Berlin. These trams travel on Sunday afternoons, mainly as a nostalgic tourist attraction, from Møhlenpris towards Engen – stopping currently at the start of Olaf Ryes vei. This museum tram has served since 1994, and branches towards Damsgård, Nordnes and Bryggen are being planned.

== Trams ==
The system had 70 trams and 48 trailers, delivered between 1897 and 1948. All but the last class of trams were two-axled, making Bergen the last tramway in Norway to take delivery of bogie trams in 1947. This class was also the first to be built by a Norwegian manufacturer, with all former classes being of German manufacture.

Class	Quantity	Manufacturer	Motor	Length (m)	Length (ft)	Power (kW)	Power (hp)	Seats	Ref
BS 1897	16	Falkenried	UEG	6.40	21.0	24	32	16	
BS 1910	6	Unknown	AEG	7.50	24.6	50	67	16	
BS 1913	8	Nordwaggon	AEG	9.40	30.8	70	94	24	
BS 1915	10	P. Herbrand & Cie	AEG	8.54	28.0	52	70	18	
BS 1921	19	Nordwaggon	AEG	9.50	31.2	78	105	24	
KES 1909	1	P. Herbrand & Cie	Siemens	9.60	31.5	70	94	24	
KSS 1913	1	Falkenried	Siemens	10.47	34.4	84	113	16	
BS 1947	10	Strømmen	Norsk Elektrisk og Brown Boveri	12.20	40.0	76	102	23	
