= Pan Trafikk =

Former Norwegian bus company

Pan Trafikk AS
- Industry: Transport
- Founded: 1992
- Defunct: 1999
- Fate: Merged
- Successor: Gaia Trafikk
- Headquarters: Bergen, Norway

Pan Trafikk was a Norwegian bus company operating in and around the city of Bergen. The company was created as a merger between Åsane Billag and Bilruta Fana–Os–Milde. The company had depots in Åsane, Fana, Osøyro, and Søreide. In 1999, the company merged with Bergen Sporvei to create Gaia Trafikk, which was later merged with Hardanger Sunnhordlandske Dampskipsselskap, forming Tide.

The company operated buses painted red in the surrounding areas around the original municipality of Bergen. Within the old city limits Bergen Sporvei had a monopoly on bus transport with its yellow buses. North of Bergen Pan had all routes between Bergen Bus Station and Åsane in addition to routes in Fana and Osøyro. The company also operated the airport bus.

The goal of Pan Trafikk was originally to operate in multiple modes of transportation (thus the name Pan, derived from the Greek Pantos meaning everywhere). This idea was instead left and focus was changed to all types of bus transport. In 1993, Pan, along with Hardanger Sunnhordlandske Dampskipsselskap, Haugaland Billag and Stavanger og Omegn Trafikkselskap Kystbussen, started a NOR-WAY Bussekspress express bus between Bergen and Stavanger.

When Nordhordland Bridge opened in 1994, Pan Trafikk started cooperating with the bus company in the north, Bergen Nordhordland Rutelag, replacing the old need to change bus at the ferry quay and instead both companies operating bus routes into each other's areas. In 1998 Pan started cooperating with Bergen Sporvei, both companies operating into each other areas. This later resulted in the merger between the two and the creation of Gaia Trafikk, which merged with Hardanger Sunnhordlandske Dampskipsselskap in 2006, and is now called Tide.
