= Fjord1 Fylkesbaatane =

Norwegian transport company

Fjord1 Fylkesbaatane AS
- Company type: Subsidiary
- Industry: Transport
- Founded: 1858
- Headquarters: Florø, Norway
- Area served: Norway
- Key people: Stig Kristoffersen (CEO)
- Number of employees: 700
- Parent: Fjord1 Nordvestlandske
- Subsidiaries: Naviera Sognekongen SA (49%); Aysen Express SA (99%); Silver Sea AS (34%); Vestskyss (33,3%); Den norske kulturbåten (33,3%); Kysten Bergen (20%); Fjord Reefers (49%)
- Website: www.fjord1.no

Fjord1 Fylkesbaatane (formerly known as Fylkesbaatane i Sogn og Fjordane and Nordre Bergenhus Amts Dampskibe) is a Norwegian transport company. It is a subsidiary of the Fjord1 Nordvestlandske conglomerate and primarily runs ferry, passenger and freight traffic in Vestland county.

The company was founded in 1858 under the name Nordre Bergenhus Amts Dampskibe and the first two ships SS Framnæs and SS Fjalir were purchased that year. The company was publicly owned as it has remained since. From 1896 to 1903 later Norwegian Prime minister Christian Michelsen was director. In 1919 the company changed its name to Fylkesbaatane i Sogn og Fjordane. In 1914 the two first motor ships were purchased. In 1937 the company built their last steam powered ship SS Fanaraaken. In 1939 the first car ferry, Lærdal, was added to the fleet.

During the 1950s, '60s and '70s, the company grew along with the general post-WWII expansion and improvement in Norwegian infrastructure. The company developed into its present form from the late 1960s when the first fast passenger boats were built. From the same period car ferries became a top priority. The bulk of the Fylkesbaatane fleet still consists of ferries from the period 1960–1980.

In 1971 the company opened a fast passenger route from Sogn og Fjordane to Bergen. One of the ships used was the world's first commercial passenger catamaran M/S Fjordglytt. Today there is one route from Bergen to Sogn and one to Nordfjord. The Sogn route is at its end stop in Øvre Årdal 6 hours and 15 minutes after leaving Bergen. The Nordfjord route is at its end stop in Selje 4 hours and 55 minutes after leaving Bergen. There are also several local fast passenger boat routes.

In 2001 Fylkesbaatane i Sogn og Fjordane and Møre og Romsdal Fylkesbåtar created the company Nordvestlandske. The cooperation culminated in 2002, by the formation of the Fjord1 Nordvestlandske group. This merger did not go down undisputed, as some of the decisions were seen as unfavourable to Møre og Romsdal. It was decided that the conglomerate headquarters should be located in Florø. It was also unpopular in Møre og Romsdal that Sogn og Fjordane county received a 59% majority share in Fjord1, thereby effectively seizing control of the company.

The ships of Fylkesbaatane have been a vital and major part of the lives of people living in the steep fjords and along the rugged coastline of Sogn og Fjordane. Before the transportation network was developed significantly from the 1950s they were the only means of transportation in the region. This has among other things been reflected by the Norwegian Postal Service issuing three stamps featuring the Fylkesbaatane ships Framnæs, Kommandøren and Hornelen. A few of the old legendary fjord ships are preserved by enthusiasts. Among them are Atløy , delivered in 1931, and Stavenes. Several books have also been written on the history of the company and its ships.

Fjord1 Fylkesbaatane has around 700 employees and its main office in Florø.

The company is currently involved in a project to introduce Liquefied natural gas (LNG) powered car ferries. Two such ferries are already in operation and more are under construction at Aker Yards and BLRT Fiskerstrand.

== Fleet ==
Car ferries

- MF Aurland
- MF Bergensfjord
- MF Dalsfjord
- MF Eid
- MF Etne
- MF Fanafjord
- MF Fanaraaken
- MF Fjærlandsfjord
- MF Florøy
- MF Førdefjord
- MF Gloppen
- MF Gulen
- MF Lote
- MF Lærdal
- MF Mastrafjord
- MF Nordfjord
- MF Nårasund
- MF Raunefjord
- MF Selje
- MF Sogn
- MF Sognefjord
- MF Stavangerfjord
- MF Stryn
- MF Sunnfjord
- MF Svanøy
- MF Værøy

Combination ships

- MS Fjordglytt
- MS Sylvarnes

Passenger ferries

- MS Gudvangen
- MS Skagastøl (otherwise known as the Nice Boat)

Fast passenger boats

- MS Delfin jr.
- MS Fjordprins
- MS Fjordtroll
- MS Kommandøren
- MS Solundir

== Sources ==
- Fjord1 official site
