= Bergen Program =

Former program for investments in Norway

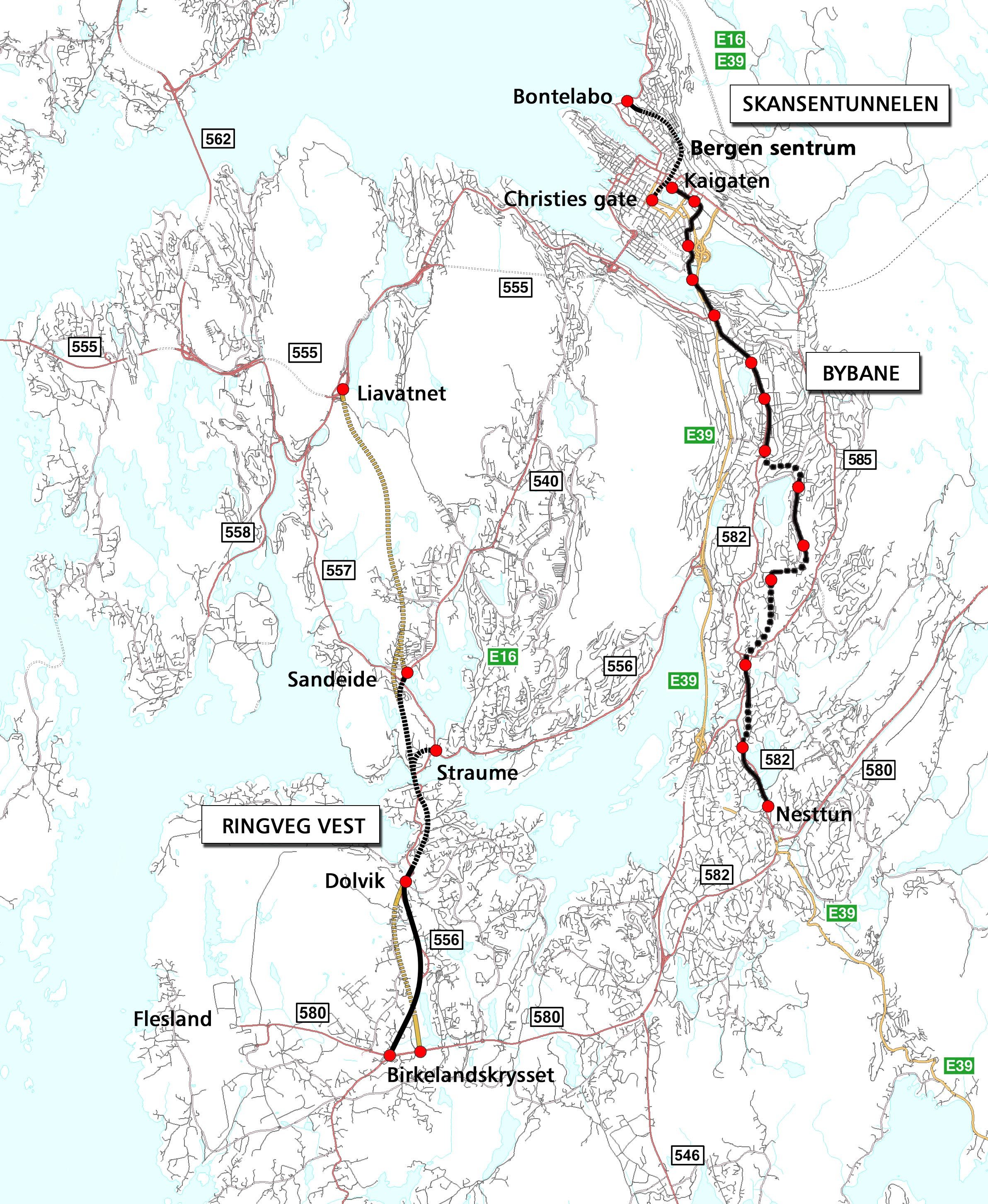
Map of the project

The Bergen Program for Transport, Urban Development and the Environment (Norwegian: Bergensprogrammet for transport, byutvikling og miljø) is a political agreement for financing road and light rail investments in Bergen, Norway, from 2002 to 2015. The projects cost 5.3 billion kr, and will be partially financed through state grants and partially through a toll ring.

The main projects are:

- Construction of the Bergen Light Rail from the city center via Nesttun and Rådal to Bergen Airport, Flesland.
- The Skansen Tunnel in the city center
- Ring Road West
- Various pedestrian and cyclist roads
