= Nygård Bridge =

Bridges in Bergen, Norway

Nygård Bridge Nygårdsbroen
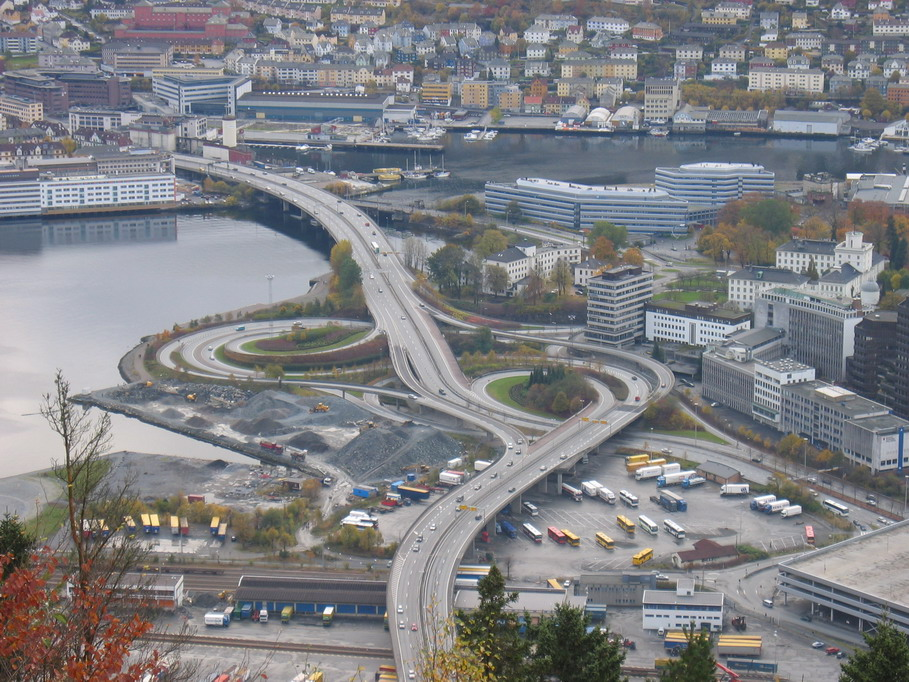
- View of the bridge
- Coordinates: 60°22′51″N 5°20′03″E
- Locale: Bergen

Location
- Interactive map of Nygård Bridge

The Nygård Bridge (Norwegian: Nygårdsbroen) is a bridge in Bergen Municipality, Vestland county, Norway. The bridge consists of a series of parallel bridges that cross the Strømmen, the sound entering the Store Lungegårdsvannet bay just southeast of the centre of the city of Bergen. The original Old Nygård Bridge was constructed in 1854 and carries the two tracks of the Bergen Light Rail as well as pedestrians and cyclists. The New Nygård Bridge opened in 1978, and carries six lanes of European Route E39. The New Nygård Bridge II, built in 2008, carries the two lanes of Nygårdsgaten street.

== History ==
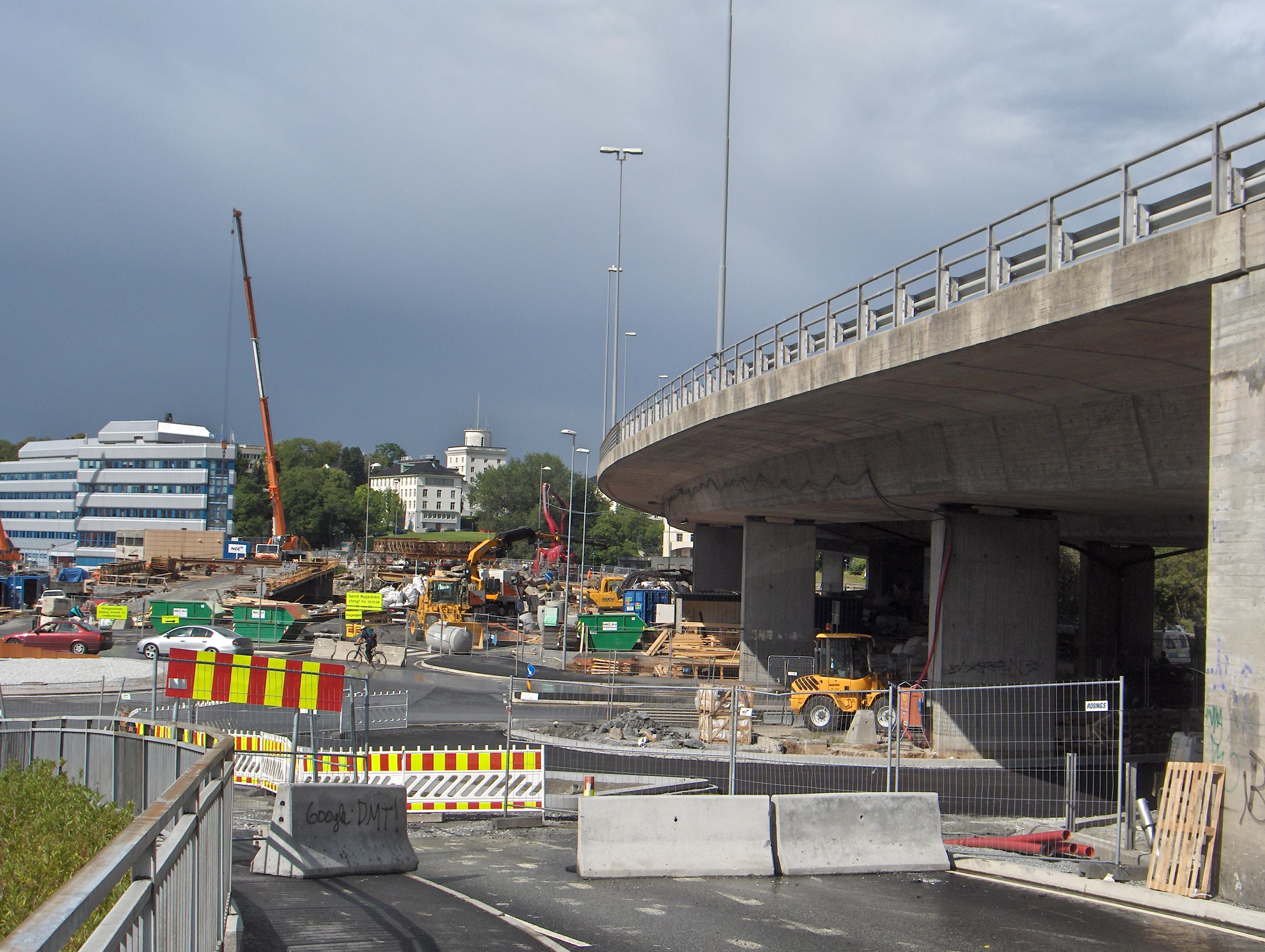

The old bridge was opened in 1854 as a bridge for both pedestrians and vehicles. From 1884 to 1913, it carried the Voss Line of the Norwegian State Railways, and later a line of the Bergen Tramway when Line 1 was extended in 1919, until it was closed down in 1963. In 1938, it was made twice the width. In 2008, the old bridge was rebuilt to carry the Bergen Light Rail, while the street was moved to a new bridge, the New Nygård Bridge II.
