= Trolleybuses in Bergen =

Transit system in Bergen, Norway

Bergen trolleybus system
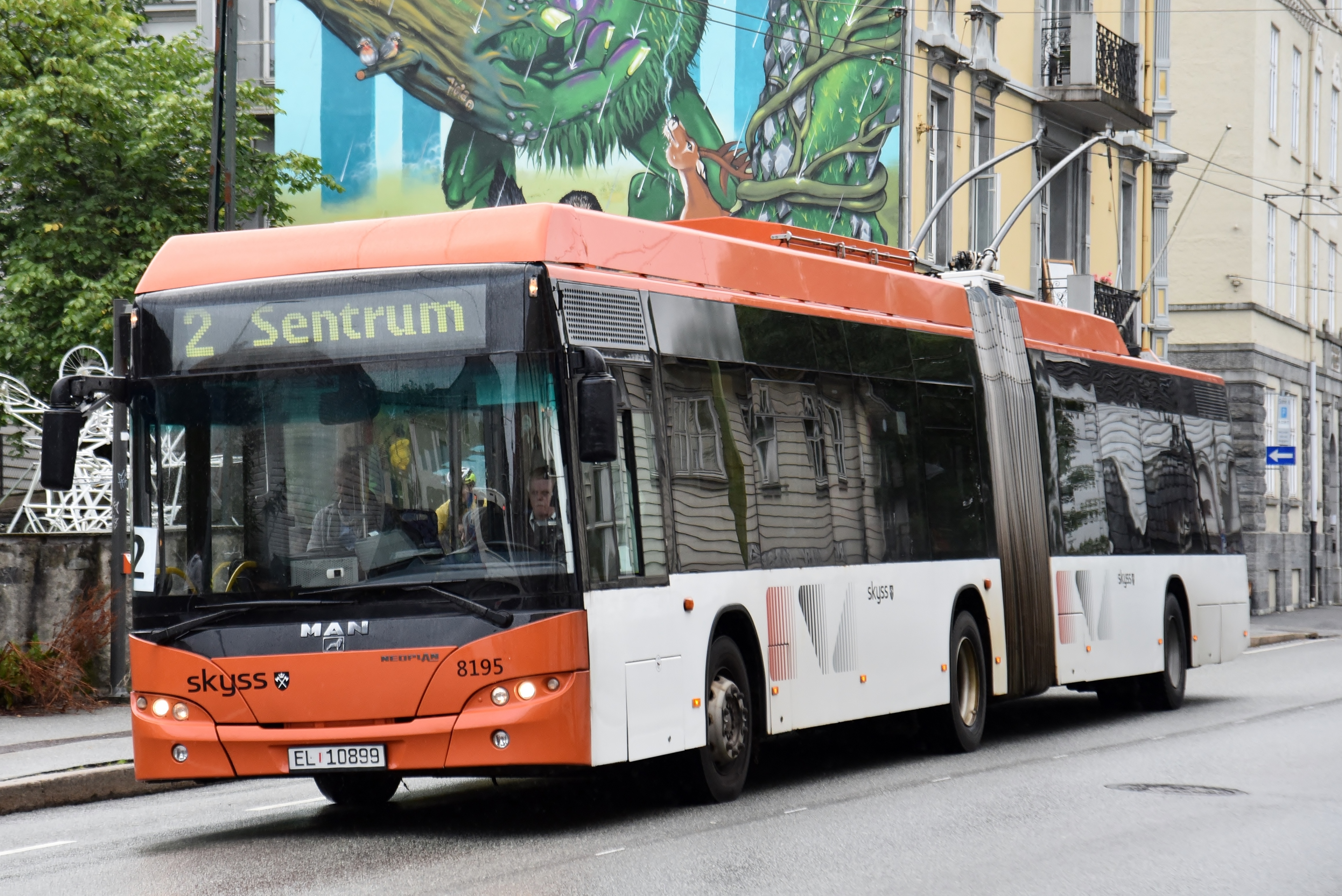
- A Neoplan N6321 (also referred to as MAN-Neoplan Kiepe) trolleybus operated by Tide Buss on line 2.

Operation
- Locale: Bergen, Norway
- Open: 24 February 1950
- Routes: 1
- Owner: Skyss
- Operator: Tide Buss

Infrastructure
- Electrification: DC parallel overhead lines

Statistics
- Route length: 7 km (4.3 mi)
- 6,000
Overview
- Website: http://www.tide.no ATM (in Norwegian)

The Bergen trolleybus system serves the city of Bergen, Norway. It is the only trolleybus system still in operation in Norway and one of two trolleybus systems in Scandinavia.

It opened on February 24, 1950, as the Bergen Tramway was gradually closed and some of the tram lines were converted to trolleybus. It was built and operated by Bergen Sporvei, and is now operated by its successor, Tide Buss. In October 2025 it was announced that the trolleybus system will be closed by 2030.

As of 2007, it had six trolleybuses and two dual-mode buses.

== History ==
The first trolleybus network in Norway, in Drammen, opened in 1909. Planning for a trolleybus system began in Bergen in 1928, and in 1937 Bergen Sporvei, the company operating Bergen's tramway, began studying trolleybus systems around Europe. On July 7, 1940 the city council decided to build two trolleybus lines: Line 5, Mulen - city centre - Møhlenpris, and line 7, Nordnes - city centre - Fjøsangerveien. In 1942 Bergen Sporvei started converting some of its gasoline buses to trolleybuses, but in 1944 the German occupation forces took the completed bus and moved it to Lübeck, and the company stopped rebuilding.

The fuel shortage during World War II made trolleybuses extremely popular, since Norway had an abundance of cheap electricity. After the war the construction of the 4.1-km line 5 started, and in 1950 it replaced tram line 3. By that time, five gasoline buses had been converted, giving a headway of 10 minutes. A year later, three more buses were bought from Strømmens Værksted and the headway was reduced to 7.5 minutes. The line was popular, and traffic increased. In 1954 the conversion of tram line 2 to trolleybus started, and in 1957 the 6.5-km line 2 opened with 18 new buses. The ridership reached its peak in 1959 with more than ten million passengers per year on the two routes. In 1960 the sale of cars in Norway was deregulated, resulting in fewer public transport riders.

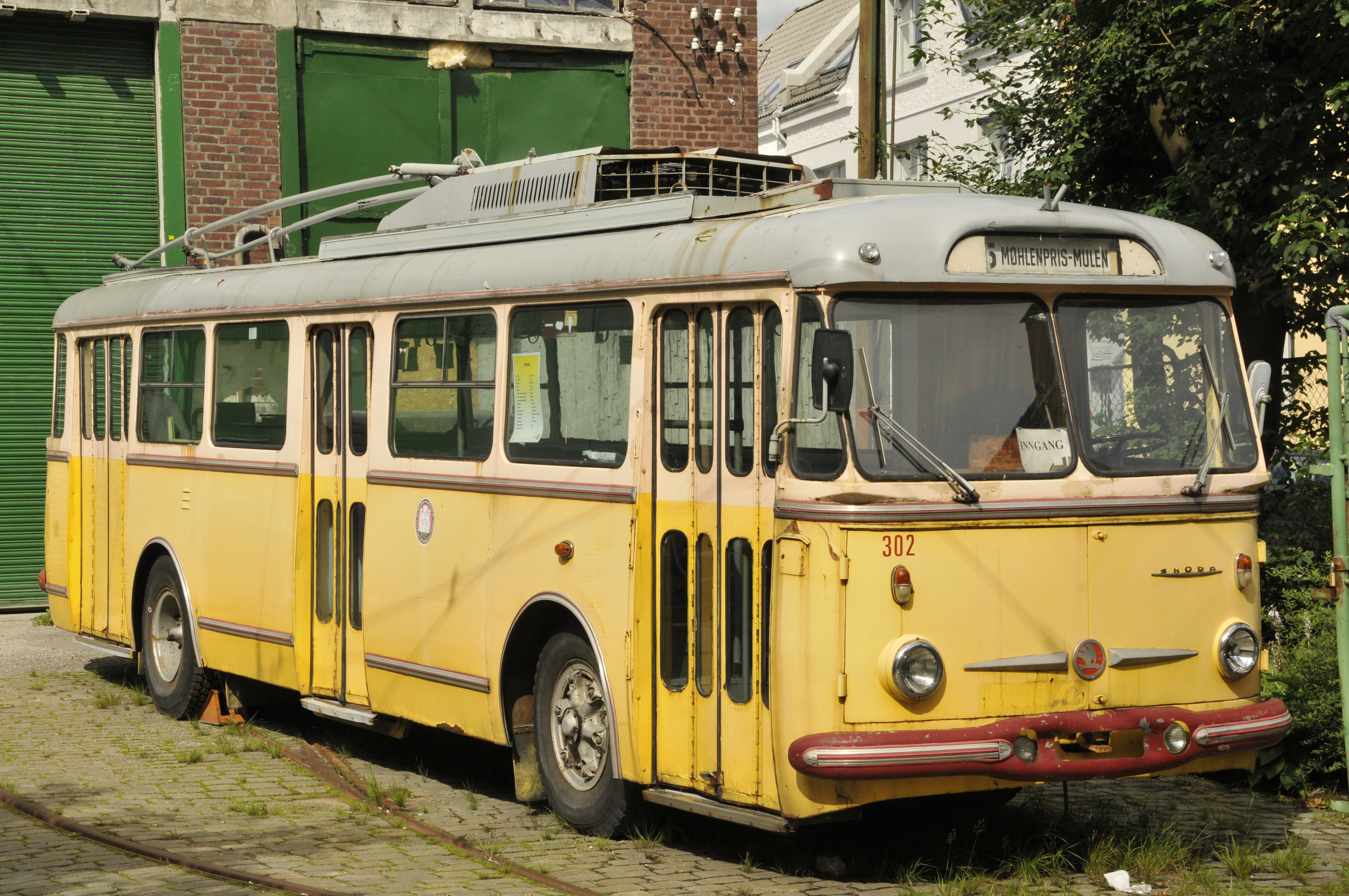
A Skoda 9Tr, in service in Bergen from 1973 to 1986.

Through the 1970s Bergen Sporvei tried to end trolleybus operation, but the city council would not allow that. However, in 1995 there was major road works resulting in the closure of line 5. As of 2007 line 5 was still closed, leaving line 2 the only trolleybus line in Norway.

Plans related to the new Bergen Light Rail system involve expanding the trolleybus line from Møhlenpris to Oasen and from Mulen to Paradis. In 2019, ten trolleybusses, specifically Solaris Trollino 18 IV were ordered for NOK 80 million, each with 55 kWh battery. The line is to be extended to Laksevåg.
