= Fjord1 MRF =

Transport company in Norway

Fjord1 MRF AS
- Type: Subsidiary
- Industry: Transport
- Founded: 1920
- Defunct: 19 September 2012
- Headquarters: Molde, Norway
- Area served: Norway
- Key people: Anker Grøvdal (CEO)
- Number of employees: 900 (2006)
- Parent: Fjord1 Nordvestlandske
- Website: www.fjord1.no

Fjord1 MRF formerly called Møre og Romsdal Fylkesbåtar, short form MRF is a regional Norwegian transportation company, part of the Fjord1 Nordvestlandske group. The company headquarters are in Molde.

MRF is Norway's largest car ferry company. It employs 900 people, and operates 37 ferries on 27 routes, servicing in total 66 destinations in Møre og Romsdal county. The company also has five passenger boats running in four routes. In a typical year, MRF transports about 4.5 million cars and over 10 million passengers.

The company was established in 1920 by the merger of a number of local boat services, at that point vital communication links at the road network was scarce in the rugged terrain of Møre og Romsdal. The company was from the outset owned by the Møre og Romsdal county administration and was originally called Møre Fylkes Ruteselskap. During the fifties, sixties and seventies, the company grew along with the general post-World War II expansion and improvement in Norwegian infrastructure. The bulk of the MRF fleet still consists of ferries from the period 1960–80. During the late 1990s, the company began expanding into other sectors, notably by acquiring a number of local bus companies, that are now merged to Fjord1 Buss Møre. The company also owns 49% of Kystekspressen.

This process culminated in 2002, by the formation of the Fjord1 Nordvestlandske group, a joint venture with Sogn og Fjordane's Fylkesbaatane. This merger did not go down undisputed, as it was decided that the conglomerate headquarters should be located in Florø. It was also unpopular that Sogn og Fjordane fylke received a 59% majority share in Fjord1, thereby effectively seizing control of the company.
