= Gaia Trafikk =

Former Norwegian company

Gaia Trafikk AS
- Industry: Transport
- Founded: 1998
- Defunct: 2006
- Fate: Merged
- Successor: Tide
- Headquarters: Bergen, Norway

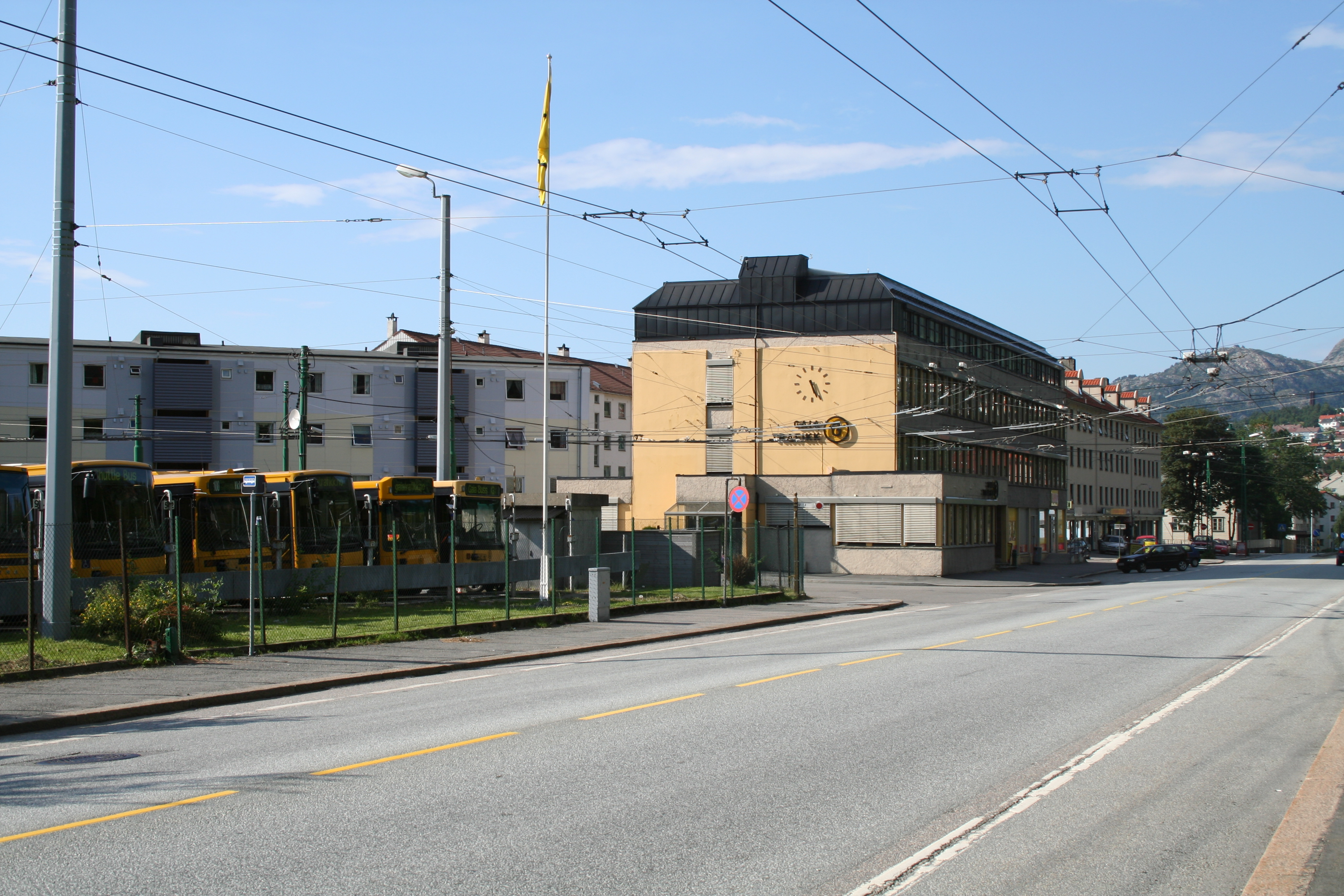
The Headquarters of Gaia Trafikk in Landås. Overhead electrical wires for the trolleybuses are visible above the road

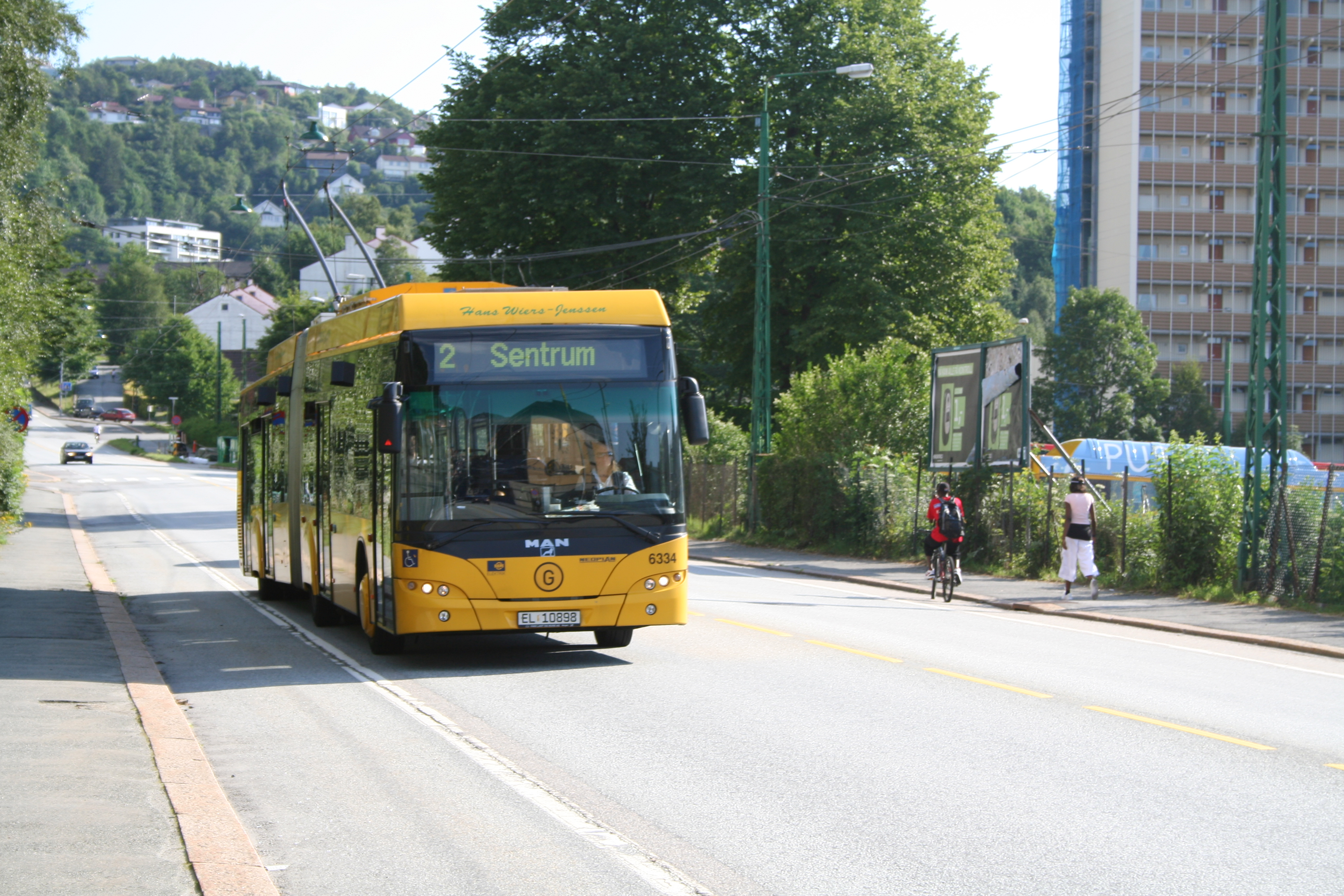
A trolleybus operated by Gaia Trafikk

Gaia Trafikk was the largest public transportation provider in Bergen Municipality and Os Municipality in Norway, until it merged with HSD to form the new company called Tide. Its operation included the Bergen trolleybus system.

Gaia was formed by the 1998 merger of Pan Trafikk, the bus company serving northern and southern Bergen, and Bergen Sporvei, the company serving Bergen's inner city. The route network covered most of Bergen Municipality, but the western suburbs were serviced by Hardanger Sunnhordlandske Dampskipsselskap (HSD). This resulted in a fixed fleet between the yellow buses of Bergen Sporvei and the red buses of Pan Trafikk being operated by the same company, and coordinated, making a more user-friendly bus system. The largest owners of Gaia was Bergen Municipality (43.6%), HSB (7.9%), Yrkestrafikkforbundet (7.3%), and Os Municipality (7.3%).

Among the fleet of about 300 buses were 8 trolleybuses (two of them are dual-mode buses), making Bergen the only city in north-west Europe to have them. Gaia fleet also contained 36 natural gas buses.

In 2006, Gaia Trafikk merged with HSD to form the company Tide. The general assembly at HSD approved the merger on 29 June 2006, and Gaia approved on 17 July 2006. The new company is listed on the Oslo Stock Exchange. Both British Arriva and the Norwegian Nettbuss had announced a wish to buy Gaia, indicating a price around NOK 400 million.
