= Fjord1 =

Norwegian transport conglomerate

Fjord1 AS
- Company type: Aksjeselskap
- Industry: Transport
- Founded: 2001
- Headquarters: Florø, Norway
- Area served: Norway
- Key people: Dagfinn Neteland (CEO)
- Revenue: NOK 2,835 million (2021)
- Operating income: NOK 280 million (2021)
- Number of employees: 1201 (2021)
- Website: www.fjord1.no

Fjord1 AS is a Norwegian transport conglomerate, one of the largest in the Norwegian transport sector. Formed in 2001, company headquarters are in Florø, with the headquarters of the ferry division in Molde. It operates a fleet of environmentally friendly vessels in the Norwegian fjords.

== Formation ==
Nordvestlandske was formed in 2001 by the merger of the county council-owned ferry companies Møre og Romsdal Fylkesbåtar and Fylkesbaatane i Sogn og Fjordane, becoming Fjord1 in December 2002. The fact that the merged company headquarters were located in Sogn og Fjordane made the merger unpopular in Møre og Romsdal county. The choice of name, Fjord1, was also not well-accepted among the local population. These strains on public relations, amongst other things, resulted in talks intended to further the merger process breaking down during the winter and spring of 2004.

Fjord1 AS was listed on the main list on the Oslo Stock Exchange on 15 August 2017. In 2021, US investment firm Vision Ridge Partners and Havila Holding, an investment company owned by the Sævik family, privatised the company, with each having 50% ownership.

== Operations ==
The company is one of the largest in the Norwegian transport sector. A holding company with numerous subsidiaries, its main assets are the two ferry companies MRF and Fylkesbaatane, which serve the rugged and numerous fjords of Møre og Romsdal and Vestland counties. The company is involved in numerous transport ventures within its two home counties, including a 66% ownership of the bus company Aukra Auto, a 49% ownership of fast ferry company Kystekspressen (operates an express boat route from Kristiansund to Trondheim) and a 49% of Fjord1 Partner, that operates the Bergen Light Rail. It owned four local bus companies, including Fjord1 Buss Møre, Fjord1 Sogn Billag, Hallingdal Billag and Fjord1 Nordfjord-Ottadalen.

In 2005, the company had 75 ships, 394 buses and 147 trucks and transported 24 million passengers. A study by Siemens and the Bellona Foundation in 2016 identified that of Norway's 180 ferries on 112 ferry routes, 127 could feasibly be replaced with either fully electric or hybrid ferries. Fjord1 is transitioning to low- and zero-emission technology and introduced two fully electric ferries, MF Gloppefjord and MF Eidsfjord on the E39 Anda to Lote route in 2018. Between 2017 and 2021, Fjord1 put into service 26 new hybrid-battery ferries and converted a further eight vessels to hybrid-battery propulsion, so they had 34 hybrid battery vessels operating on 17 routes, approximately 43 per cent of its ferries. The 2019 Annual Report records 19.9 Million passengers and 9.9 million vehicles carried.

The group also operates in the tourism sector, through Fjord Tours Group (50/50 ownership with Vy-Gruppen) and The Fjords (50/50 ownership with Aurland Ressursutvikling).

Ferries operated by Fjord1
name	year built	passenger capacity	route
MF Aukra	1978	245	
MF Aurland	1977	146	
MF Austrått	2018	195	Brekstad - Valset
MF Bergensfjord	2006	589	Mortavika - Arsvågen
MF Bjørnsund	1979	245	Festvåg - Misten
MF Boknafjord	2011	589	Mortavika - Arsvågen
MF Bolsøy	1971	345	Geiranger - Hellesylt
MF Bømlafjord	2020	145	Buavåg - Langevåg
MF Dalsfjord	1986	146	
MF Davik	2009	196	Askvoll - (Fure) - (Gjervik)
MF Driva	1963	146	Arasvika - Hennset
MF Dryna	2005	146	Brattvåg - Dryna (until 31-12-2022)
MF Edøyfjord	2011	146	relief
MF Eid	1978	146	Sæbø - Leknes
MF Eidsfjord	2017	345	Anda - Lote
MF Eira	2002	297	relief
MF Eresfjord	2019	295	Sølsnes - Åfarnes
MF Fanafjord	2007	589	laid up
MF Fannefjord	2010	390	Drag - Kjøpsvik (from 1-12-2022)
MF Fedjebjørn	2019	145	
MF Florøy	2020	295	Ranavik - Skjersholmane
MF Geiranger	1979	245	
MF Giskøy	2019	394	Hareid - Sulesund
MF Gloppefjord	2017	345	Anda - Lote
MF Glutra	2000	345	Bognes - Skarberget (from 1-12-2022)
MF Grip	2020	395	Seivika - Tømmervåg
MF Gulen	1989	295	laid up
MF Hadarøy	2018	394	Hareid - Sulesund
MF Harøy	2006	146	relief
MF Hillefjord	2019	299	Ranavik - Skjersholmane
MF Hjørundfjord	2011	292	relief
MF Horgefjord	2018	295	Hufthamar - Krokeide
MF Hornelen	2016	195	Måløy - Husevågøy - Oldeide
MF Husavik	2018	146	Husavik - Sandvikvåg
MF Ivar Aasen	1997	295	Solholmen - Mordalsvågen
MF Julsund	2004	295	Jektevik - (Nordhuglo) - Hodnanes
MF Kommandøren	2018	296	Halhjem - Våge
MF Korsfjord	2010	390	Halsa - Kanestraum
MF Kvernes	1976	147	Festøya - Hundeidvika
MF Lifjord	2010	346	laid up
MF Losna	2016	196	Rysjedalsvika - (Rutledal) - (Losna) - Krakhella
MF Lote	2006	438	Bognes - Skarberget (from 1-12-2022)
MF Lærdal	1997	296	Gjermundshamn - (Varaldsøy) - Årsnes
MF Mastrafjord	2007	589	Mortavika - Arsvågen
MF Moldefjord	2009	390	Halsa - Kanestraum
MF Møkstrafjord	2018	295	Hufthamar - Krokeide
MF Møringen	2020	195	Sandvika - Edøya
MF Norangsfjord	2010	350	Aukra - Hollingsholmen
MF Nordfjord	2001	146	Askvoll - (Fure) - Værlandet
MF Raunefjord	2007	589	Mortavika - Arsvågen (relief)
MF Romsdal	1988	73	
MF Romsdalsfjord	2010	390	Halsa - Kanestraum
MF Rovdehorn	2019	394	Sykkylven - Magerholm
MF Rødvenfjord	2021	295	Sølsnes - Åfarnes
MF Samlafjord	2019	295	
MF Selje	1987	199	Stårheim - Isane
MF Sildafjord	2020	299	Gjermundshamn - (Varaldsøy) - Årsnes
MF Skopphorn	2019	394	Sykkylven - Magerholm
MF Smøla	2020	195	Sandvika - Edøya
MF Sogn	1982	345	relief
MF Sognefjord	1984	443	relief
MF Solnør	1977	146	relief
MF Solskjel	1981	198	laid up
MF Stangvikfjord	2020	149	Kvanne - Rykkjem
MF Stavangerfjord	2007	589	Mortavika - Arsvågen
MF Stordal	1979	245	
MF Storfjord	2011	292	Leirvåg - Sløvåg
MF Sulafjord	1986	399	relief
MF Suløy	2019	394	Hareid - Sulesund
MF Sunnfjord	1978	194	
MF Svanøy	1992	89	
MF Sykkylvsfjord	1975	146	Stranda - Liabygda
MF Tustna	2019	394	Seivika - Tømmervåg
MF Vestrått	2018	195	Brekstad - Valset
MF Veøy	1974	345	Geiranger - Hellesylt
MF Volda	2002	297	Stranda - Liabygda
MF Vågsøy	2009	147	Molde - Sekken
MF Årdal	2008	292	Hatvik - Venjaneset
Passenger boats
MS Fjordglytt	2000	81	
MS Sylvarnes	2000	70	
MS Tansøy	2007	94	
