= L. Rødne og Sønner =

Norwegian ferry operator

L. Rødne og Sønner AS
- Industry: Transport
- Founded: 1956
- Headquarters: Finnøy Municipality, Norway
- Area served: Western Norway
- Number of employees: 120
- Website: http://www.rodne.no

L. Rødne og Sønner AS is a passenger ferry operating company in Rogaland and Vestland counties in Norway. It operates 14 ferries, of which 11 are fast ferries. The company operates public transport for the transport authorities Kolumbus and Skyss, boat ambulance services for Stavanger Hospital Trust, Fonna Hospital Trust and Bergen Hospital Trust, and since 1974 charter tourist services in Lysefjord. The company was founded in 1956, based in Sjernarøy Municipality and owned by ten members of the Rødne family.
