= Bergen Sporvei =

Public transport company in Bergen, Norway

Bergen Sporvei AS
- Industry: Public transport
- Founded: 1898
- Defunct: 1998
- Fate: Merger
- Successor: Gaia Trafikk
- Headquarters: Bergen, Norway
- Products: Bergen Tramway; Bergen trolleybus system Yellow buses
- Parent: Municipality of Bergen

Bergen Sporvei AS was a municipal owned public transport company that operated in Bergen, Norway from 1898 to 1998. The company operated the Bergen Tramway, the Bergen trolleybus system and the yellow buses in Bergen.

== History ==
The company was founded as Bergen Elektriske Sporvei in 1898 to operate the tramway that was built in Bergen. After the municipality nationalized the tramway it changed name to Bergen Sporvei. Eventually the company also started operating buses. Both the trams and buses where yellow. In 1965 the tramway was closed and replaced with trolleybuses, also operated by Bergen Sporvei. As a consequence of the municipal merger in Bergen in 1972, Laksevåg Kommunale Rutebilselskap was merged into Bergen Sporvei. After the municipal merger there were a number of bus companies in Bergen, and Bergen Sporvei only retained route permissions within the old municipal borders was well as Laksevåg. In 1998, Pan Trafikk, operating the red suburban buses was merged with Bergen Sporvei, creating the new company Gaia Trafikk.
