= Bergen Byleksikon =

Encyclopedia of Bergen, Norway

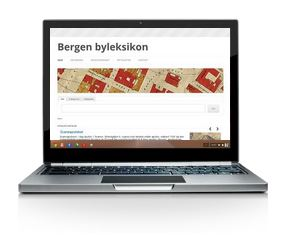
Bergen city encyclopedia - online edition

Bergen Byleksikon is an encyclopedia which covers the city of Bergen in Norway. It was first published in 1994 and is authored by Gunnar Hagen Hartvedt. A revised version was released in 2009, and a new edition in 2009. It was published online in 2013.

Bergen byleksikon is one of Norway's most comprehensive local history encyclopedias, with a total of 4,300 search terms. The work started in 1988 and had to take into account, among other things, that Bergen changed the spelling on a number of streets in 1994.
