= Skansen Tunnel (Bergen) =

Tunnel in Bergen, Norway

Coordinates: 60°23′49″N 5°19′53″E

The Skansen Tunnel is a proposed road tunnel in the city centre of Bergen in Vestland county, Norway. The tunnel would begin at Bontelabo by the large cruise ship port and it would run in one of two possible paths. The first path would run to the southeast and then south to meet up with the road Christies gate in the city centre. The second path would head east until it connects up with the Fløyfjell Tunnel. The intention is to allow traffic to and from Sandviken to bypass historic Bryggen and the city centre and connect up with a main highway. The project would be part of Norwegian County Road 585 and financing has been secured through the Bergen Program. The tunnel is estimated to cost 430 million kr and it is in the planning stages from 2011–2015.
