= Tide (transportation company) =

Public transport company in Vestland, Norway

Tide AS
- Type: Aksjeselskap
- Industry: Transport
- Founded: 2006
- Headquarters: Bergen, Norway
- Area served: Norway; Denmark
- Services: Bus transport Car ferry transport Fast passenger craft
- Revenue: ▲NOK 2 billion (2005)
- Number of employees: 3,000 (2007)
- Parent: Det Stavangerske Dampskibsselskap
- Website: www.tide.no

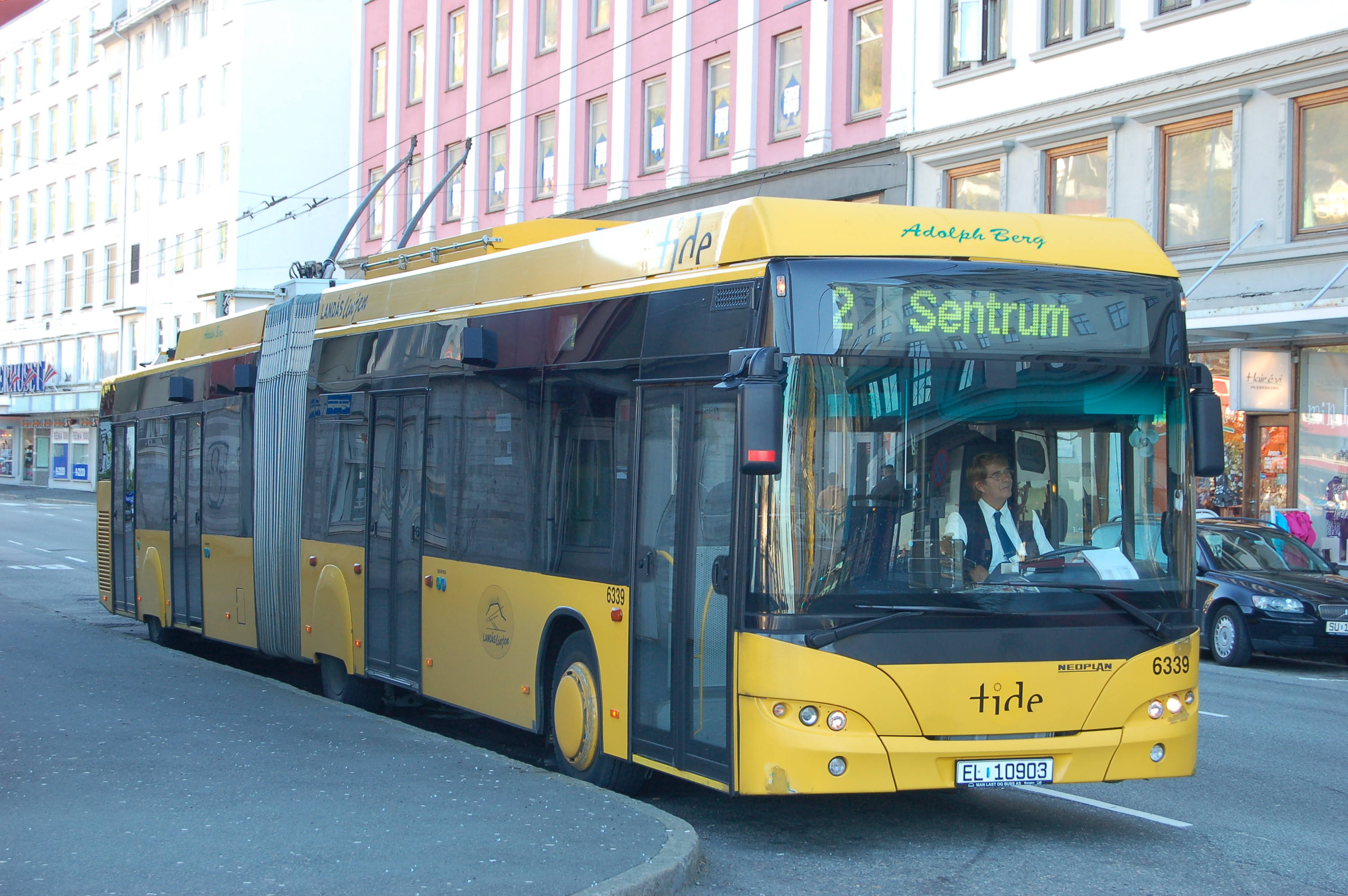
A Bergen trolleybus operated by Tide on line 2

Tide ASA is a public transport company in Vestland county, Norway. It resulted from the merger of Gaia Trafikk and Hardanger Sunnhordlandske Dampskipsselskap (HSD). The company provides the public transit network in Bergen Municipality, and most of the bus service in the former Hordaland county on contract with Skyss. Tide also runs the buses in northern Rogaland on contract with Kolumbus.

The group has two daughter companies, Tide Buss AS that operates the scheduled buses, and the leisure travel company Tide Reiser AS that also operates express, airport, and charter buses and chartered ferries and fast passenger craft.

Formerly, Tide operated the passenger- and car ferry routes previously operated by HSD and Stavangerske, with the daughter company Tide Sjø.

The company was delisted from the Oslo Stock Exchange when it was acquired by Det Stavangerske Dampskibsselskap.

== Assets ==
At the time of the merger, Tide had a total of

- 1040 buses
- 30 car ferries
- 10 boats

The company has about 3000 employees. The total value of the company was estimated at NOK 800 million. The company has 39 million passengers per year, of which 25 million are in Bergen. The company operates the Bergen trolleybus system, the only trolleybus service in Norway, which currently consists of line 2, using eight trolleybuses. Another trolleybus service in Scandinavia runs in Landskrona, Sweden.

== The merger process ==
Plans for mergers and takeovers in Hordaland's public transport business came forth in September 2005 when Connex Norge reported interest in purchasing Gaia. On November 8 Gaia and HSD suggested a merger between the two companies instead, but the city cabinet leader of Bergen Municipality, Monica Mæland and the mayor of Os Municipality opposed the idea. The employees of both companies openly supported the idea in June 2006. Two other companies, Arriva and Nettbuss, a subsidiary of the Norwegian State Railways also showed interest in a takeover.

As majority shareholder in Gaia, the city council of Bergen Municipality decided to vote in favour of the HSD-Gaia merger on June 19, 2006. The name "Tide" was presented on June 27. Just a day before the Extraordinary General Meetings in both companies, Arriva submitted an indicative bid of NOK 380-400 million and the representative of Bergen's cabinet, Henning Warloe, voted against the merger at Gaia's general meeting on June 29. As this was against the city council's resolution a motion of no confidence was proposed. This motion failed on November 20, 2006 A new general meeting was called for Gaia and on July 17, the merger was approved in that company as well. The Norwegian Competition Authority approved the merger on October 25.

Initially, the buses in the new company retained their old colors, yellow for Gaia, red and white for HSD, with only the logo being changed. New buses will have a white livery.

The value of both the new brand name "Tide", as well as the new logo have been subject to some debate. "Gaia" and "HSD" were both well-established trademarks, and two experts on trademarks stated that the replacement name and logo were too anonymous. Tide itself have argued that the name is positive ("i tide" means "on time" in Norwegian), and that the logo represents both the land and sea-based transportation. Another criticism of the logo is that it resembles the word "shit" when viewed in a mirror.

On May 2, 2007, the boards of Tide and Det Stavangerske Dampskibsselskap (DSD) approved Tide's acquisition of Stavangerske AS, the ferry operating subsidiary of DSD. Jun 26, 2007 the Annual General Meeting of Tide approved the acquisition. At the same time there was an equity issue in the company aimed at new owners which successfully raised approximately 300 kr. Effective from 1 January 2008 Stavangerske AS was merged with Tide Sjø AS. The new company retained the Tide brand. Prior to this Stavangerske and HSD had won several tenders throughout Norway through their 50/50 joint venture Norferger. "Tide Sjø" was later separated out of Tide and the ferry portion of the company became Norled from 2012.
