= Skyss =

Public transit authority of Vestland, Norway

- Type: County owned
- Industry: Public transport
- Founded: November 2007
- Headquarters: Bergen, Norway
- Area served: Vestland
- Number of employees: 105 (2026)
- Parent: Vestland county municipality
- Website: www.skyss.no

Skyss is the public authority responsible for public bus, light rail (“Bybanen”), boat and ferry services in the county of Vestland, Norway. Skyss does not have a board, but is politically governed by the county council. Skyss plans and develops line networks and schedules, awards transport contracts, and provides market and customer information. Skyss was established in the former county of Hordaland in 2007 and extended in 2020 by the merger with the former county of Sogn og Fjordane. Contracts for the operation of bus, boat and ferry routes are awarded to private traffic companies after tender competitions managed by Skyss.

The gross operating costs in 2024 were NOK 5,3 billions. Total income (including ticket revenue) was NOK 1,7 billion. The gap between costs and income is covered by the county council.

Skyss has since the establishment in 2007 conducted a major reform within public transport. Achievements include the commencement of the Bergen Light Rail in 2010 and several major bus route changes to optimize public transport in areas and corridors where there are most travellers. The changes have over the years led to a significant growth in passenger numbers.

Skyss is responsible for the ticket payment systems, including a mobile application (Skyss Billett) in which travellers can purchase tickets for bus, lightrail and boat travels.
