= List of shopping centres in Norway =

The first shopping centre in Norway was built in Bærum in 1953. New shopping centres came up in the 1960s and the 1970s, but the explosion of shopping malls didn't start before the end of the 1980s when Kvadrat, City Syd and several other large malls were built.

== Norwegian shopping centres ==
Name	Location	Number of stores
Strømmen Storsenter	Strømmen	201
Sørlandssenteret	Kristiansand	200
Sandvika Storsenter	Sandvika	195
Amfi Moa	Ålesund	185
Oslo City / Byporten	Oslo, Bydel Sentrum	175
Kvadrat	Sandnes	160
Ski Storsenter	Ski	145
Jessheim Storsenter	Jessheim	144
Arken	Bergen	138
Lagunen Storsenter	Bergen	180
Sartor Storsenter	Straume	134
Farmandstredet	Tønsberg	126
Gulskogen Senter	Drammen	125
Storo Storsenter	Oslo, Bydel Sagene	125
Jekta Storsenter	Tromsø	130
Metro Senter	Lørenskog	102
AMFI Moss	Moss	100
AMFI Steinkjer	Steinkjer	100
Liertoppen	Drammen	100
Stovner Senter	Oslo, Bydel Stovner	100
Buskerud Storsenter	Krokstadelva	90
Vestkanten	Bergen	90
Torvbyen	Fredrikstad	85
CC Gjøvik	Gjøvik	83
Lørenskog Storsenter	Lørenskog	83
Byporten	Oslo, Bydel Sentrum	82
Down Town	Porsgrunn	81
Lillestrøm Torv	Lillestrøm	80
Oasen Storsenter	Karmøy	80
Trekanten	Asker	80
CC Vest	Oslo, Bydel Ullern	78
Herkules	Skien	78
AMFI Borg	Sarpsborg	75
Storbyen	Sarpsborg	75
Vinterbro Senter	Vinterbro	75
City Nord	Bodø	74
Trondheim Torg	Trondheim	73
Tveita Senter	Oslo, Bydel Alna	73
Bergen Storsenter	Bergen	72
City Syd	Trondheim	71
Aker Brygge	Oslo, Bydel Frogner	70
Galleriet	Bergen	70
Stavanger Storsenter	Stavanger	70
Østfoldhallen	Fredrikstad	70
Maxi Hamar Storsenter	Hamar	68
Amanda Storsenter	Haugesund	67
Magasinet	Drammen	65
Strandtorget	Lillehammer	65
Roseby	Molde	64
Manglerud Senter	Oslo, Bydel Østensjø	63
AMFI Vågen	Stavanger	60
Kilden	Stavanger	60
Knarvik Senter	Bergen	60
Solsiden	Trondheim	60
Linderud Senter	Oslo, Bydel Bjerke	58
Mosseporten	Moss	55
Ålesund Storsenter	Ålesund	53
Namsos Storsenter	Namsos	52
KBS Kjøpesenter	Trondheim	47
Nerstranda	Tromsø	46
AMFI Narvik	Narvik	45
Holmensentret	Asker	45
Byhaven	Trondheim	42
AMFI Pyramiden	Tromsø	40
Gunerius Shoppingsenter	Oslo, Bydel Grünerløkka	35
ALTI Ørsta	Ørsta,	34
Tuvensenteret	Notodden	30
ALTI Nordfjord	Nordfjordeid	25
Kvartal 48	Hamar	17
AMFI Veita	Tromsø	17
Norway Shop	Oslo	5
