= Olav Thon Eiendomsselskap =

Norwegian real estate company

Olav Thon Eiendomsselskap ASA
- Type: Allmennaksjeselskap
- Traded as: OSE: OLT
- Industry: Commercial property
- Founded: 1982
- Headquarters: Oslo, Norway
- Subsidiaries: Amfi Drift AS
- Website: www.olt.no

Olav Thon Eiendomsselskap is a Norwegian real estate company that owns Shopping malls and other commercial properties in Norway and Sweden. The company is headquartered in Oslo, Norway. The company was listed on the Oslo Stock Exchange in 1983.

In June 2014, Olav Thon Eiendomsselskap bought their first Swedish shopping malls when they bought five malls from Steen & Strøm Sweden.

== Properties ==
A list of properties as of January 1, 2014.

=== Shopping centres ===
Shopping centre	Location	Ownership
Amfi Alta	Alta Municipality	100%
Amfi Borg	Sarpsborg Municipality	100%
Amfi Drøbak City	Frogn Municipality	100%
Amfi Elverum	Elverum Municipality	50%
Amfi Eidsvoll	Eidsvoll Municipality	50%
Amfi Eurosenteret	Nes Municipality	100%
Amfi Fauske	Fauske Municipality	50%
Amfi Finnsnes	Senja Municipality	100%
Amfi Florø	Kinn Municipality	100%
Amfi Geilo	Hol Municipality	50%
Amfi Kanebogen	Harstad Municipality	100%
Amfi Kirkenes	Sør-Varanger Municipality	100%
Amfi Kragerø	Kragerø Municipality	50%
Amfi Larvik	Larvik Municipality	50%
Amfi Madla	Stavanger Municipality	100%
Amfi Mandal	Lindesnes Municipality	50%
Amfi Mo i Rana	Rana Municipality	100%
Amfi Moa	Ålesund Municipality	85%
Amfi Moss	Moss Municipality	50%
Amfi Namsos	Namsos Municipality	100%
Amfi Narvik	Narvik Municipality	100%
Amfi Nærbø	Hå Municipality	25%
Amfi Orkanger	Orkland Municipality	25%
Amfi Os	Bjørnafjorden Municipality	100%
Amfi Otta	Sel Municipality	25%
Amfi Pyramiden	Tromsø Municipality	100%
Amfi Roseby	Molde Municipality	100%
Amfi Sogningen	Sogndal Municipality	50%
Amfi Steinkjer	Steinkjer Municipality	100%
Amfi Stord	Stord Municipality	100%
Amfi Svolvær	Vågan Municipality	50%
Amfi Verdal	Verdal Municipality	100%
Amfi Voss	Voss Municipality	100%
Amfi Vågan	Sandnes Municipality	100%
Amfi Vågsbygd	Kristiansand Municipality	100%
Amfi Ørsta	Ørsta Municipality	50%
Amfi Åkrehamn	Karmøy Municipality	100%
BB-senteret	Nes Municipality	50%
Bergen Storsenter	Bergen Municipality	100%
Dombås Senter	Dovre Municipality	25%
Jessheim Storsenter	Ullensaker Municipality	53%
Gunerius Shoppingsenter	Oslo Municipality	100%
Lagunen Storsenter	Bergen Municipality	42%
Leia Senteret	Nærøysund Municipality	25%
Lompensenteret	Svalbard	100%
Molde Storsenter	Molde Municipality	100%
Moldetorget	Molde Municipality	100%
Mosseporten	Moss Municipality	50%
Namsos Storsenter	Namsos Municipality	100%
Narvik Storsenter	Narvik Municipality	100%
Oasen Storsenter	Karmøy Municipality	100%
Romerikssenteret	Ullensaker Municipality	100%
Sandens	Kristiansand Municipality	50%
Sandvika Storsenter	Bærum Municipality	100%
Sartor Storsenter	Øygarden Municipality	36%
Senter Syd	Oslo Municipality	100%
Storo Storsenter	Oslo Municipality	100%
Sørlandssenteret	Kristiansand Municipality	50%
Vestkanten Storsenter	Bergen Municipality	100%
Åsane Stormarked	Bergen Municipality	100%

=== Other commercial properties ===
Property	Location	Type of property
Arnljot Gellins vei 1	Oslo Municipality	Offices
Bernt Ankers gate 6	Oslo Municipality	Offices/Retail
Bislettgata 4/6/8	Oslo Municipality	Offices
Brugata 8/10/12/14	Oslo Municipality	Retail/Offices/Apartments
Calmeyers gate 6	Oslo Municipality	Offices/Retail
Calmeyers gate 8b	Oslo Municipality	Apartments
Christian Michelsens gate 63/65	Oslo Municipality	Offices/Retail/Apartments
Claude Monets alle 14–18	Bærum Municipality	Retail
Dalsbergstien 19	Oslo Municipality	Retail
Elveveien 65/71/75-85	Bærum Municipality	Offices
Gardermoen Park	Ullensaker Municipality	Warehouse/Offices
Grensen 9a	Oslo Municipality	Offices/Retail
Hausmanns gate 31	Oslo Municipality	Offices/Apartments
Industriveien 33	Bærum Municipality	Offices
Jongåsveien 4/6	Bærum Municipality	Offices
Karl Johans gate 1	Oslo Municipality	Retail/Offices
Karl Johans gate 25	Oslo Municipality	Offices/Retail
Kristian IV's gate 12	Oslo Municipality	Restaurants/Offices
Lille Bislett 20–28	Oslo Municipality	Retail
Lillehammer Strandpark	Lillehammer Municipality	Retail/Offices
Mortensrud	Oslo Municipality	Land lot
Munchs gate 5	Oslo Municipality	Hotel
Osterhaus gate 9/11	Oslo Municipality	Offices/Apartments
Peder Claussøens gate 4	Oslo Municipality	Apartments/Retail
Pilestredet 54–56	Oslo Municipality	Offices
Pløens gate 4	Oslo Municipality	Offices/Retail
Sandakerveien 109/111	Oslo Municipality	Offices/Retail
Sandviksveien 186	Bærum Municipality	Hotel
Skibåsen 50	Kristiansand Municipality	Retail/Offices
Stenersgata 22–24	Oslo Municipality	Retail
Storgata 13	Oslo Municipality	Retail/Offices
Storgata 14/16/20	Ullensaker Municipality	Retail/Offices
Stortorvet 2	Oslo Municipality	Offices/Retail
Th. Petersons gate 7	Moss Municipality	Parking lot
Torggata 2/4/6	Oslo Municipality	Offices/Retail
Torggata 7	Oslo Municipality	Offices/Retail
Torggata 9a	Oslo Municipality	Offices/Retail
Torggata 11	Oslo Municipality	Retail/Offices
Torggata 17b/22/23/25/26/28	Oslo Municipality	Offices/Retail
Underlandsveien 6/8/10	Asker Municipality	Land lot
Universitetsgata 22/24/26	Oslo Municipality	Offices/Restaurant
Vakåsveien 4/12/14/16	Asker Municipality	Offices/Apartments
Valkyriegate 9	Oslo Municipality	Apartments
Vika Atrium	Oslo Municipality	Offices/Hotel
Vinterbro	Ås Municipality	Land lot
Vitaminveien 6	Oslo Municipality	Retail/Offices
Vitaminveien 11	Oslo Municipality	Offices/Retail
Youngstorget 4	Oslo Municipality	Offices/Retail
