= Rådal =

Neighborhood in Bergen, Norway

Coordinates: 60.2940°N 5.3238°E

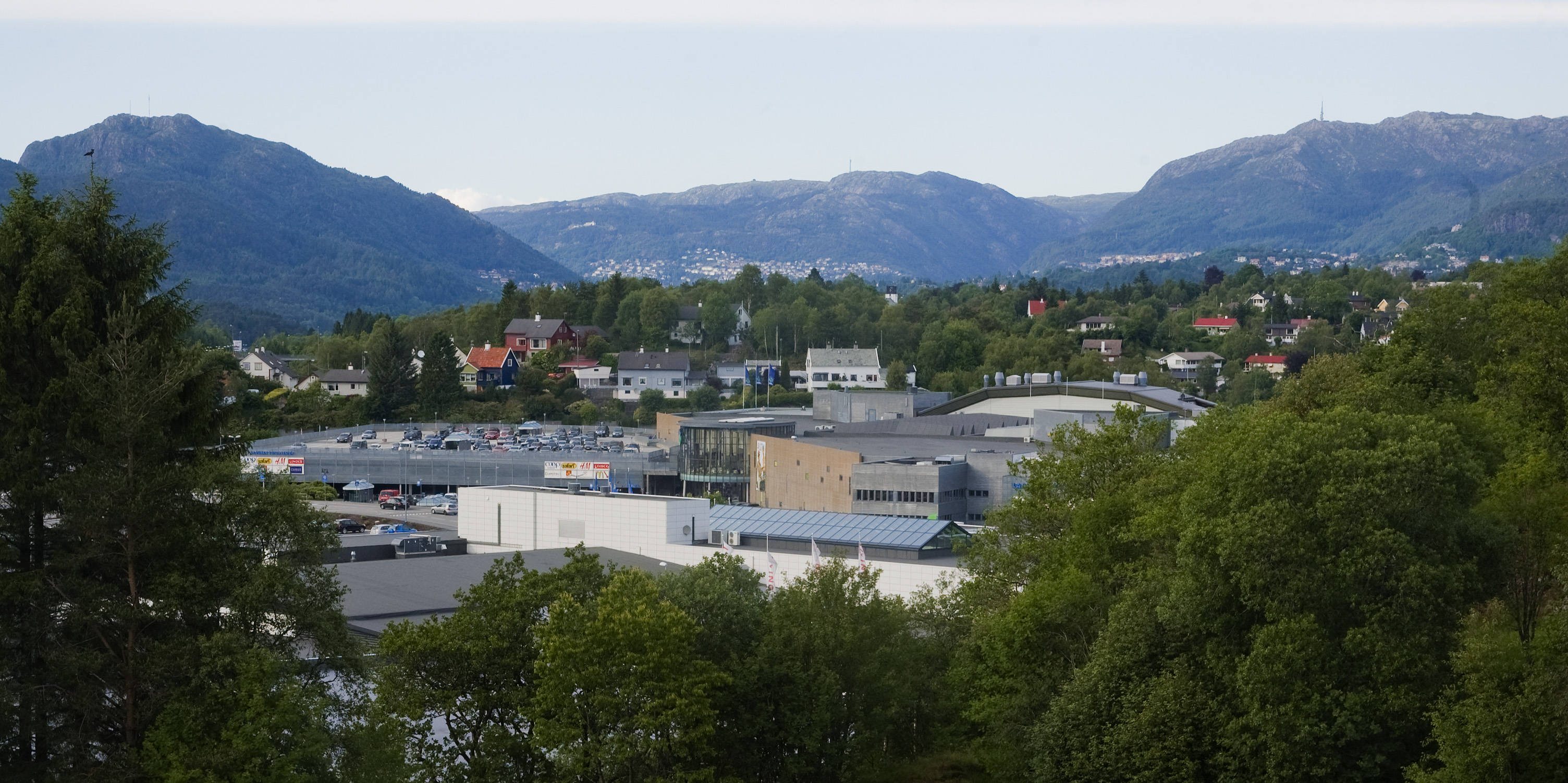
Lagunen Storsenter

Rådal is a neighborhood in the city of Bergen in Vestland county, Norway. It is located at the border between the boroughs of Fana and Ytrebygda. The center of the area is the shopping center Lagunen Storsenter. While the area has no official borders, it is regarded as the common name for the basic statistical units of Krohnåsen in Fana and Skeie, Siljustøl, and Holten in Ytrebygda. These had 5,967 residents in 2009 and covered 5.5 square kilometres (2.1 sq mi). The post address for Rådal also includes the areas Grimstad, Steinsvik, Nordås, Skjold, and Smørås.

The area features the commercial area Laguneparken, Nordahl Grieg Upper Secondary School, Rå School, Fana Stadion, Fana Golf Club, Siljustøl Museum, and the former Rådal Station on the Nesttun–Os Railway. BIR has a garbage dump at Rådal. The second stage of the Bergen Light Rail extended the system through Rådal with stops at Lagunen and Råstølen, and was finished in 2013.
