= Egon (restaurants) =

Norwegian restaurant chain

Egon restaurant
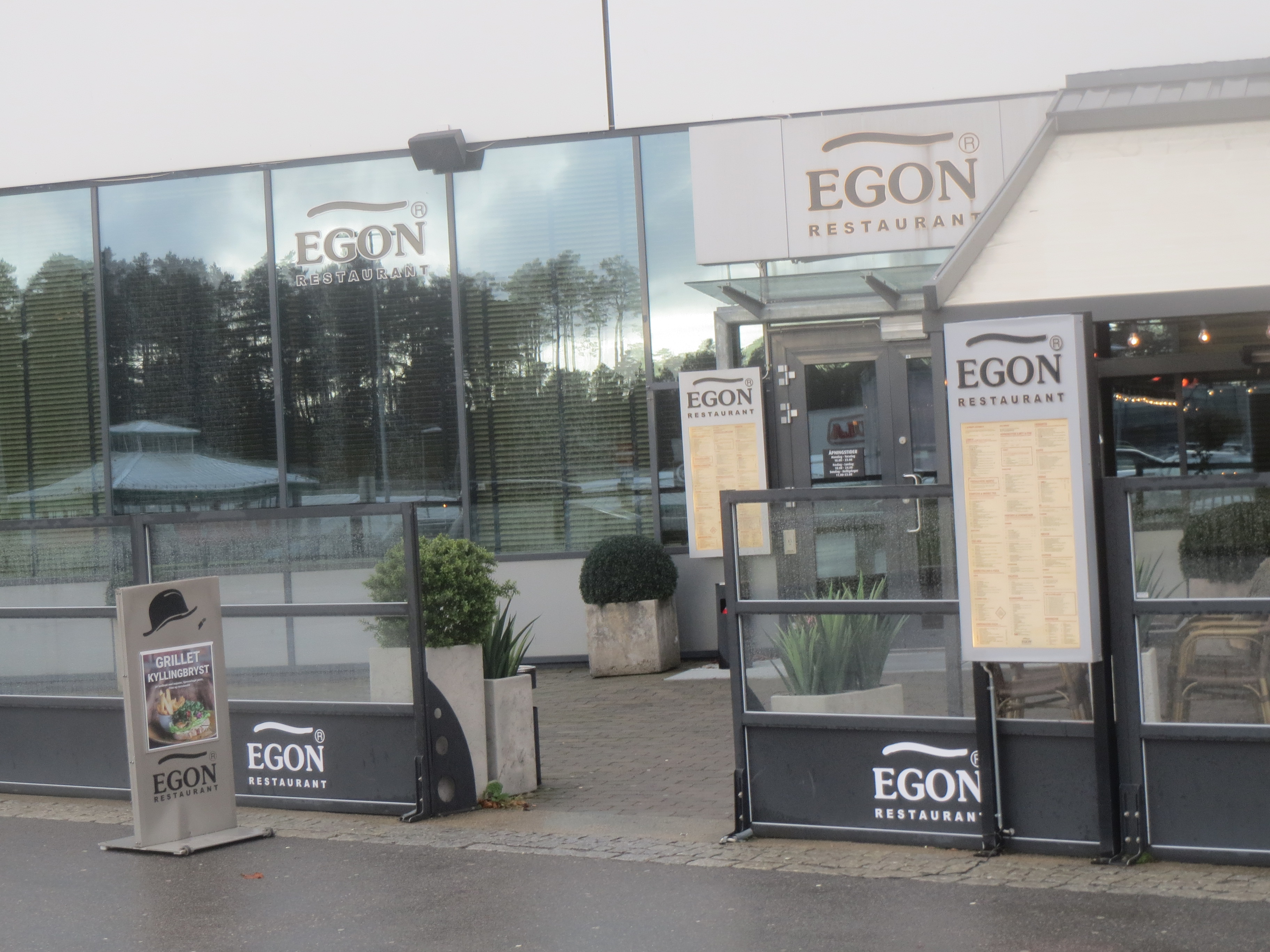

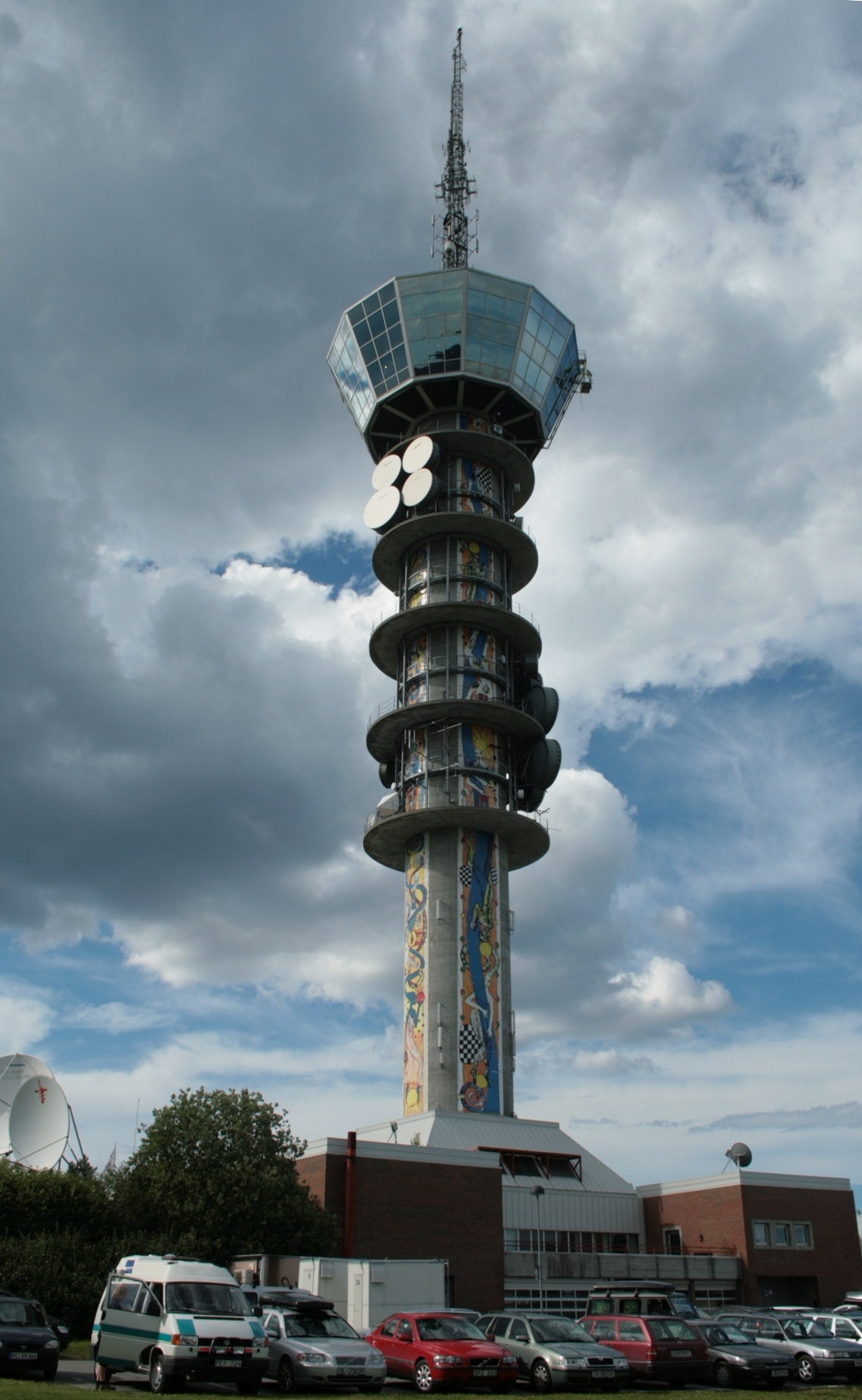
- 1. The entrance to Egon restaurant at Sørlandssenteret; 2. Tyholtårnet where the Egon restaurant spends an hour to rotate

Restaurant information
- Established: 1984
- Owner: Norrein AS
- Food type: Meat, fish, vegetarian, desserts
- Dress code: no
- Location: Norway,Sweden
- Other locations: 43
- Other information: Chain restaurant
- Website: www.egon.no, www.egon.se

Egon restaurant is a Norwegian restaurant concept that opened its first restaurant on Nordstrand in Oslo in 1984. Egon is a registered trademark and owned by Norrein AS in Trondheim. The headquarters are located in Trondheim.

The name is obtained from the film figure Egon Olsen from the Olsen Gang (Olsenbanden). Arve Opsahl, who had this role in the Norwegian films about Olsenbanden, was among the guests at the opening. Olsen's bowler hat is also used in the marketing of the restaurant chain. The concept includes that guests order and pay for the food and drinks themselves at the bar and inform the waiters on the number of the table where they are sitting. Drinks are collected by the guests. The food is served at the tables. The menu includes breakfast and lunch dishes, main courses, pizza varieties, light dishes, salads, sandwiches and hamburgers as well as desserts. The menu list has been inspired by dishes from around Europe. Norwegian Christmas food is on the menu in November, December and January. In the restaurants, printed menus are available in several languages, including English.

The interior is rugged, with brick and coarse barnboards as decorative elements.

The opening hours are daily (except Christmas Eve and Christmas Day), and most restaurants have extended opening hours on Fridays and Saturdays.

There are more than 30 restaurants, spanning the country of Norway. The restaurant chain had a turnover of NOK 1.52 billion in 2018.

In Trondheim, there is a rotating Egon restaurant at the top of Tyholttårnet, which rotates 360 ° within an hour.
