= BFG =

BFG may refer to:

== Arts and entertainment ==
- The BFG, a 1982 children's book by Roald Dahl
  - The BFG (1989 film), an ITV film by Brian Cosgrove
  - The BFG (2016 film), a Disney movie by Steven Spielberg
- BFG (weapon), fictional gun in the Doom and Quake games
- Bound for Glory (wrestling pay-per-view)
- Bunchofuckingoofs or the BFGs, a Toronto-based punk band

== Military and weapons ==
- BFG 50, a Serbu Firearms model of rifle
- British Forces Germany, a 1945–2020 U.K. military presence

== Technologies ==
- BFG (web framework), for the Python programming language
- BFG Technologies, a defunct American manufacturer of graphics cards
- Blast furnace gas, a by-product and synthetic fuel

== Other uses ==
- Bullfrog Basin Airport, Utah, U.S. (by IATA code)
- FIK BFG Fana, a Norwegian athletics club
- Busan Kayan, a lect spoken in Borneo
