= Kvadrat =

Kvadrat may refer to:

- Kvadrat (company), a Danish textile design company
- Kvadrat (shopping centre) in Norway
- Kvadrat (film), a documentary feature film about the realities of techno DJing
- 2K12 Kub, a missile launcher
