= Skjold, Bergen =

Neighbourhood in Fana, Bergen, Norway

Coordinates: 60.306°N 5.340°E

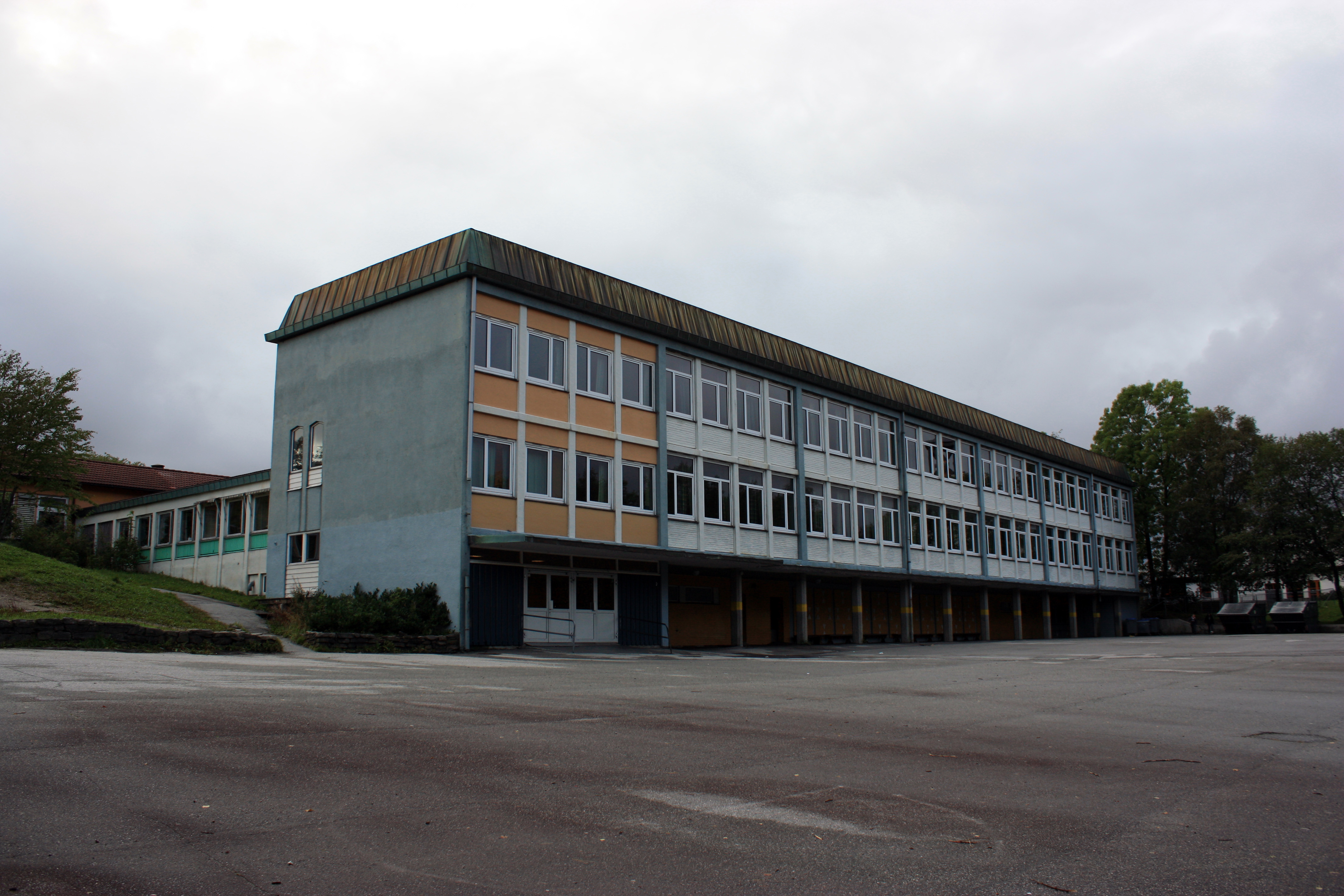
Skjold skole

Skjold is a neighbourhood in the city of Bergen in Vestland county, Norway. Located in Fana borough, it is a mostly residential area dominated by single-family homes and apartment buildings. Skjold is located to the southwest of Nesttun and east of Sørås. The area has an elementary school, Skjold skole, and a private Steiner-Waldorf elementary/lower secondary school, Steinerskolen på Skjold. Skjold Church is located in the neighborhood. The basic statistical units of Skjold and Skjoldhøgda had a combined population of 4967 as of 1 January 2009.

== Transport ==
The main thoroughfare in Skjold is Norwegian County Road 582 (Fanavegen). The 4-lane road Norwegian National Road 580 (Fritz C. Riebers veg) runs to the west of Skjold, and intersects Fv 582 just north of Lagunen Storsenter. The Bergen Light Rail system passes through Skjold, and three of its stations are located in the area: Skjold, Mårdalen and Skjoldskiftet.
