= Storo, Norway =

Neighborhood in Oslo, Norway

Coordinates: 59°56′42.41″N 10°46′37.69″E

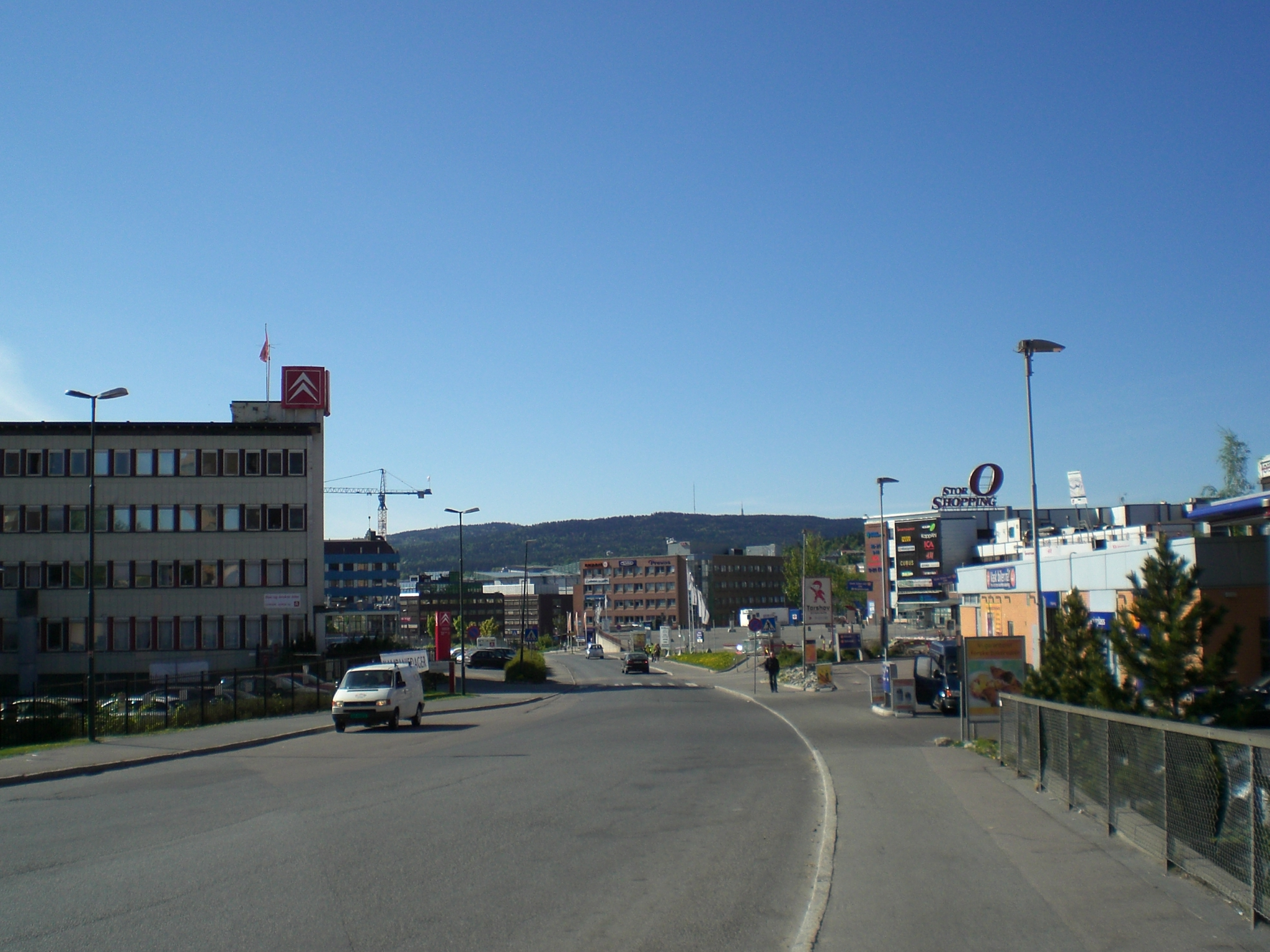
Thon Senter Storo (formerly Storo Storsenter)

Storo is a residential and commercial neighborhood in the boroughs of Sagene and Nordre Aker in Oslo, Norway. It is located east of Nydalen, south-west of Grefsen and north of Sandaker. Housing in the area is dominated by small houses, and to the south are the Grefsen tram depot and Grefsen station on the Gjøvik Line. The Ring 3 trunk road (Store Ringvei) runs past Storo, and on its west side lie the Thon Senter Storo shopping centre and several commercial and service businesses.

== The name ==
The neighbourhood is named after the farm Storo (originally Store O, "the big O"). The name O derives from the Old Norse word á (a sideform of ó), meaning 'river', here referring to the Akerselva river west of the farm. The farm O is first mentioned in 1279 ("Oo").

The farm was divided into two parts around 1550: Storo ("Store O") and Lillo ("Lille O" – lille means 'little').

== History ==
The earliest record of the farm is a letter dated 24 March 1279, in which the baron Audun Hugleiksson exchanged a markesbol (a unit of farm land) in the farm; the letter also states that Nonneseter Abbey owned four markesbol there. The main farmhouse, built around 1845, stood at what is now Grefsenveien 40. After the last owner, Lilly Storo, the property was taken over by Statsbygg in 1987, and the remaining buildings were demolished in 1995 to make way for an apartment block.

== Transport ==
Storo is a transport hub. Storo station on the Oslo T-bane Ring Line opened in 2003 and was the terminus of the Ring Line's first phase until Sinsen station opened in 2006; the architects were Jensen & Skodvin. The tram stop is located on the Storo bridge over the metro and railway lines and is served by Oslo Tramway lines 11, 12 and 18.

== Shopping centre ==
Storo Storsenter was established in 1984 in the premises of the former Foss Jernstøperi (Foss iron foundry), dating from 1880. The present complex was completed in 2010, and was named Shopping Centre of the Year in 2012 and Oslo's best shopping centre in 2012 and 2013. In 2026 the centre, owned by the Thon Group, was renamed Thon Senter Storo as part of the group's move to market its shopping centres under a common name. Construction of an upgrade including a new arcade began in May 2025.

== Planned road works ==
In 2026 the City of Oslo was planning an upgrade of Vitaminveien and the surrounding roads at Storo; construction could start in 2028 at the earliest.
