= Tyholttårnet =

Radio tower in Trondheim, Norway

Coordinates: 63°25′21″N 10°25′55″E

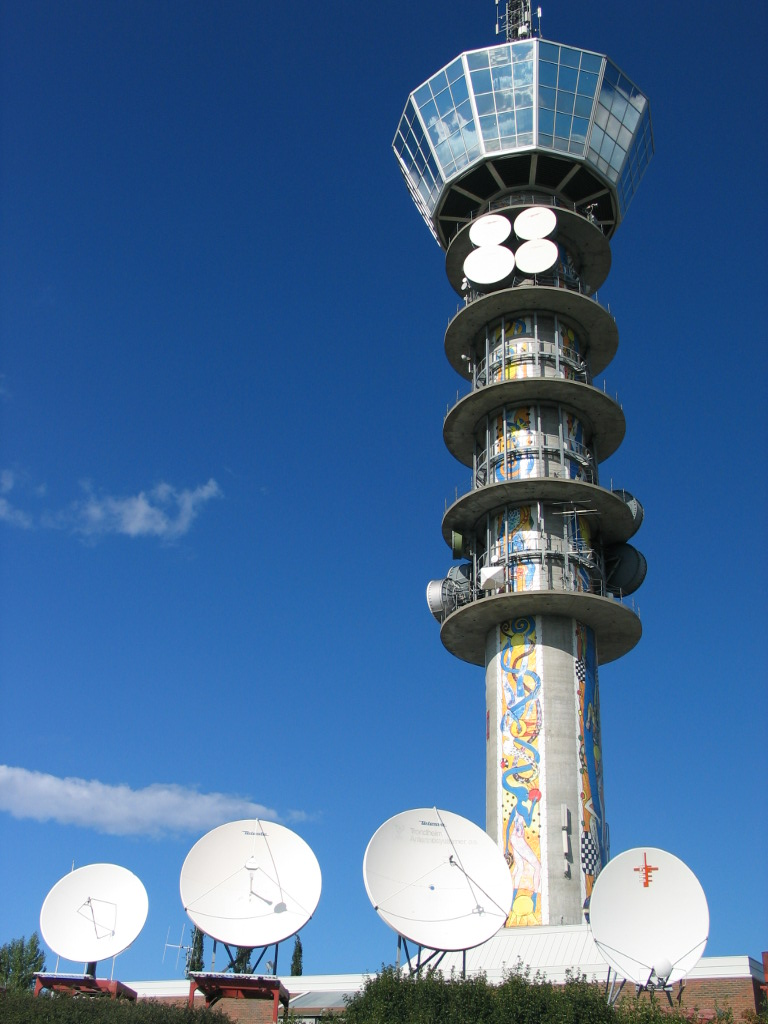
Tyholttårnet in 2006

Tyholttårnet (lit. 'The Tyholt Tower') is a 124-metre (407 ft) tall radio tower with an observation deck in Trondheim, Norway. It was completed in 1985. The tower features the Egon revolving restaurant, at an altitude of 74 metres (243 ft), which makes one complete revolution per hour.
