= Fana Stadion =

Sports venue in Bergen, Norway

Coordinates: 60°17′25.62″N 5°19′9.53″E

Fana stadion
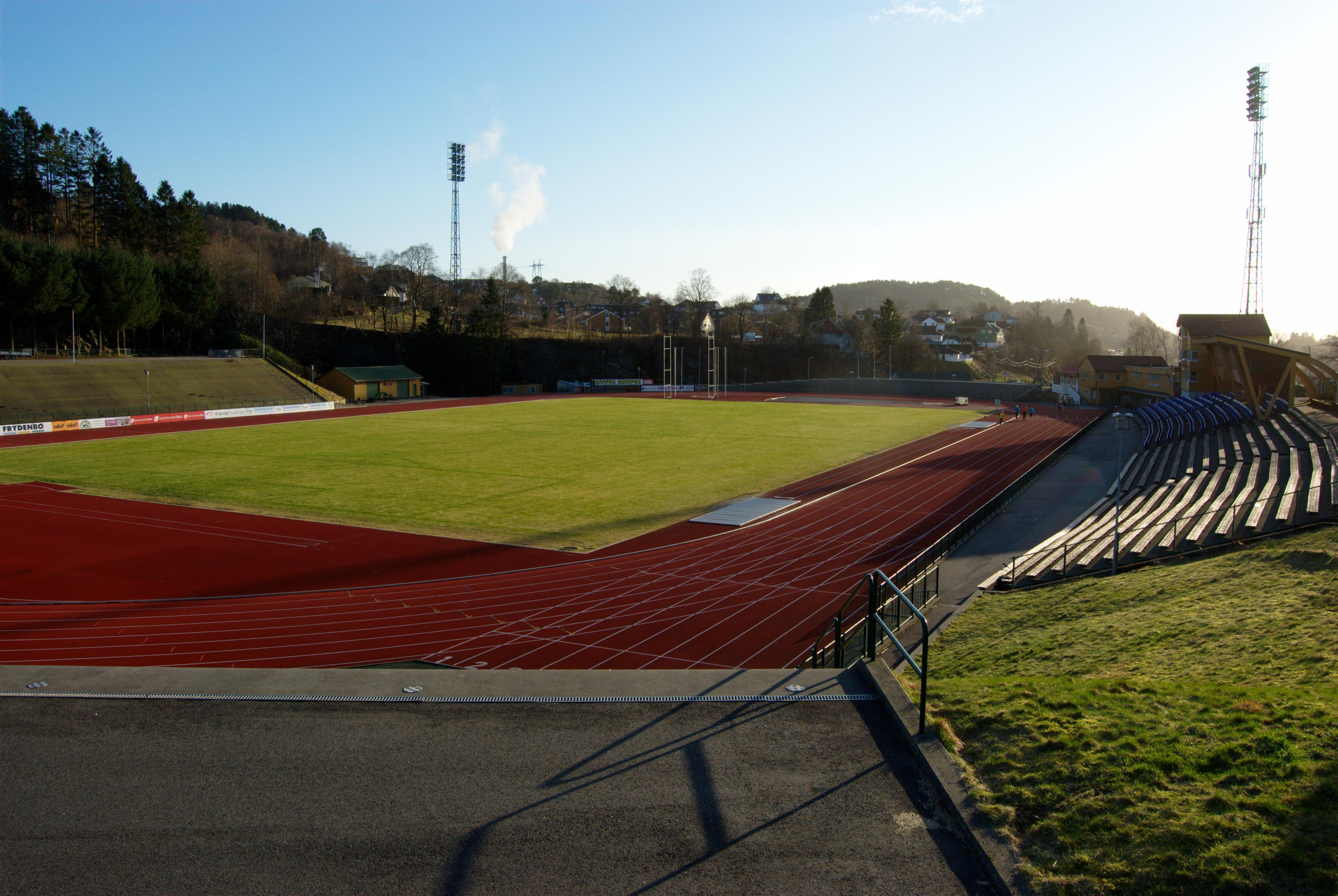
- Interactive map of Fana stadion
- Full name: Fana stadion
- Location: Rådal, Bergen, Norway
- Owner: Bergen Kommune
- Capacity: 15 000

Construction
- Opened: 1969

Tenants
- Fana IL (football); FIK BFG Fana (track and field); Bergen Rugbyklubb (rugby union); Bislett Games (2004); 2010 European Team Championships

Fana stadion is a multi-use stadium at Rådal in the borough of Fana in Bergen, Norway.

Used for football matches, it is the home ground of Second Division team Fana IL.

It also has a rubber track for track and field meets, and the stadium most notably hosted the 2004 Bergen Bislett Games. Then, a new world record in the women's 5000 metres was set by Elvan Abeylegesse. The stadium is also home to a world junior record, namely 83.87 metres by Andreas Thorkildsen in the men's javelin throw (June 2001). The venue hosted the Norwegian Athletics Championships in 1969, 1975, 1991 and 2005.
