= Skjold Church, Bergen =

Church in Vestland, Norway

Skjold Church
- Skjold kirke
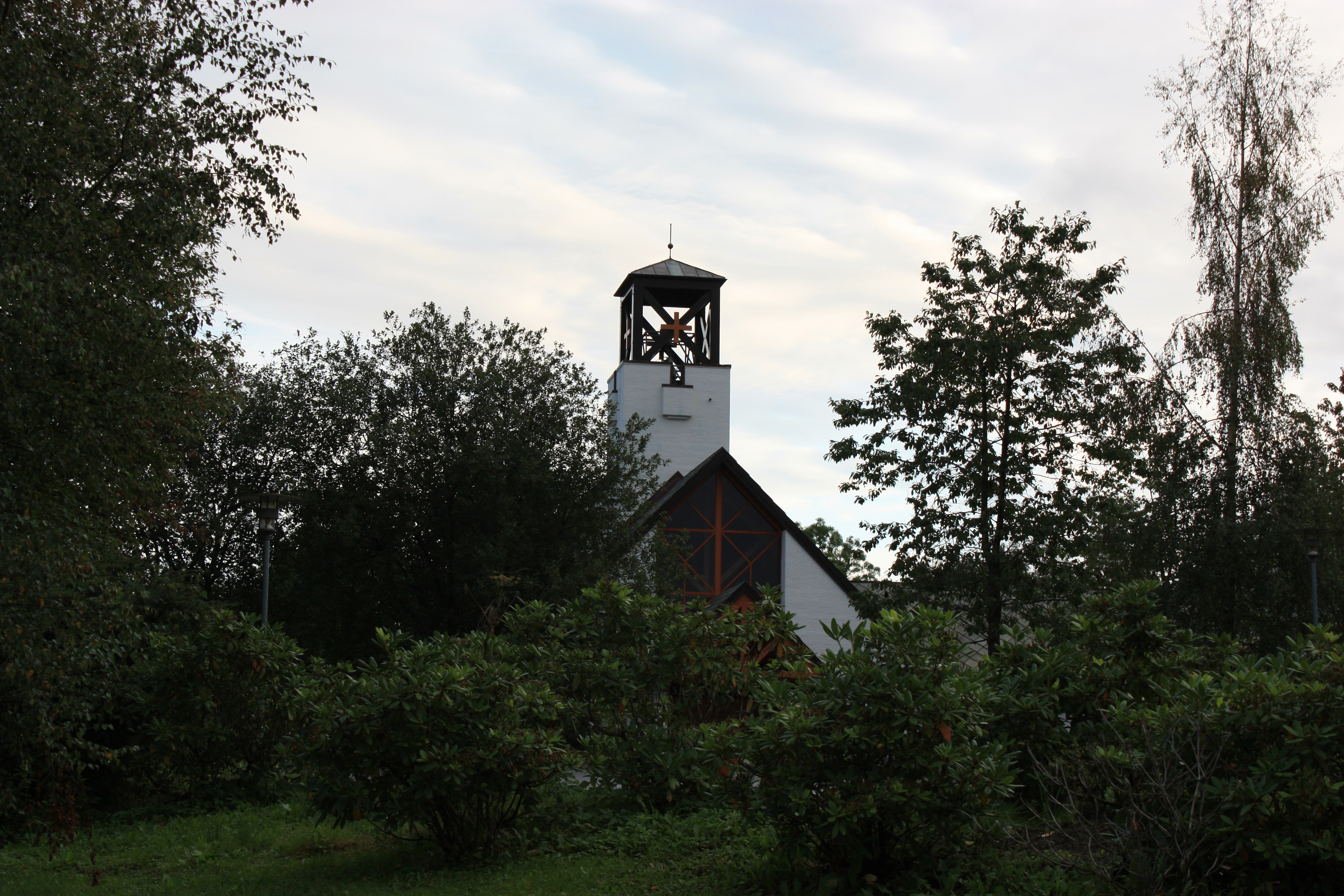
- View of the church
- Skjold Church
- 60°18′21″N 5°20′00″E
- Location: Bergen Municipality, Vestland
- Country: Norway
- Denomination: Church of Norway
- Churchmanship: Evangelical Lutheran

History
- Status: Parish church
- Founded: 1998
- Consecrated: 5 April 1998

Architecture
- Functional status: Active
- Architect: Peder A. Ristesund
- Architectural type: Rectangular
- Completed: 1998 (28 years ago)

Specifications
- Capacity: 500
- Materials: Brick

Administration
- Diocese: Bjørgvin bispedømme
- Deanery: Fana prosti
- Parish: Skjold

Skjold Church (Norwegian: Skjold kirke) is a parish church of the Church of Norway in Bergen Municipality in Vestland county, Norway. It is located in the Skjold neighborhood in the city of Bergen. It is the church for the Skjold parish which is part of the Fana prosti (deanery) in the Diocese of Bjørgvin. The white brick church was built in a rectangular style in 1998 using designs by the architect Peder A. Ristesund. The church seats about 500 people.

== History ==
The foundation stone was laid on 6 June 1997 and it was completed in less than one year. After its completion, the church was consecrated on 5 April 1998 by the Bishop Ole Hagesæther. The architect for the church was Peter A. Ristesund and Aud Hundskår was in charge of the interior design. The main sanctuary seats about 280 people, but it is expandable up to about 500 by moving some folding walls.

== Media gallery ==
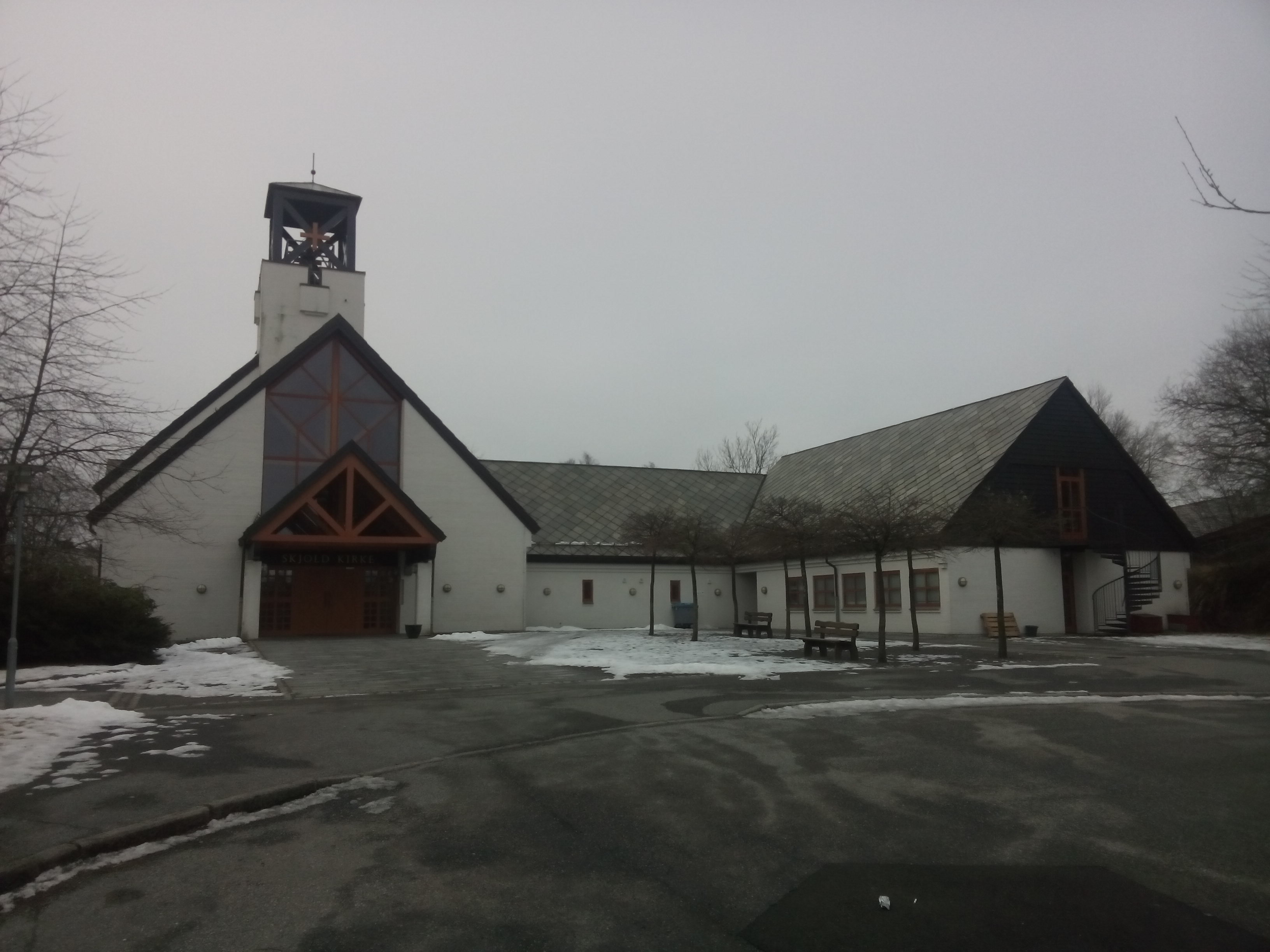
Exterior

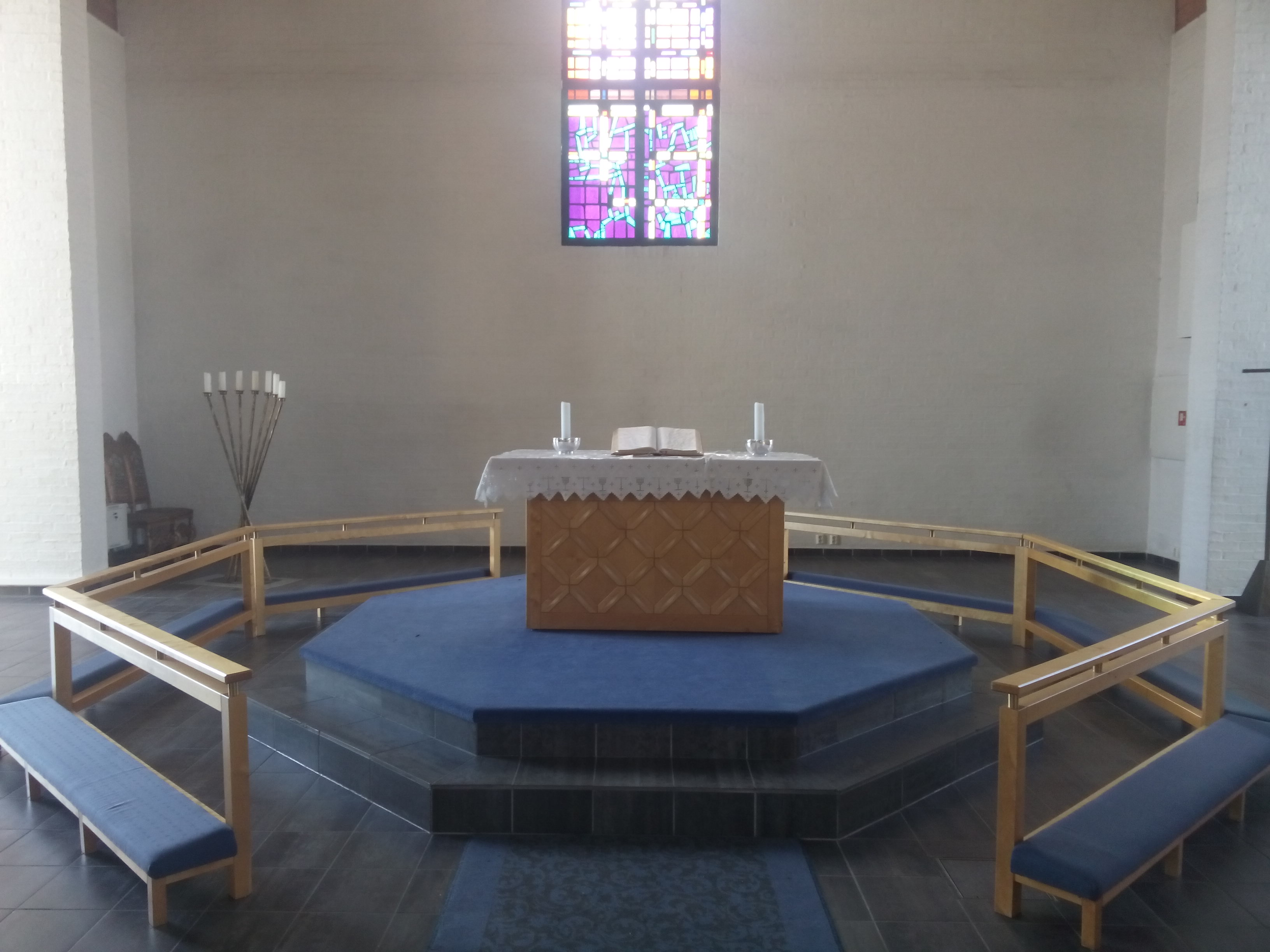

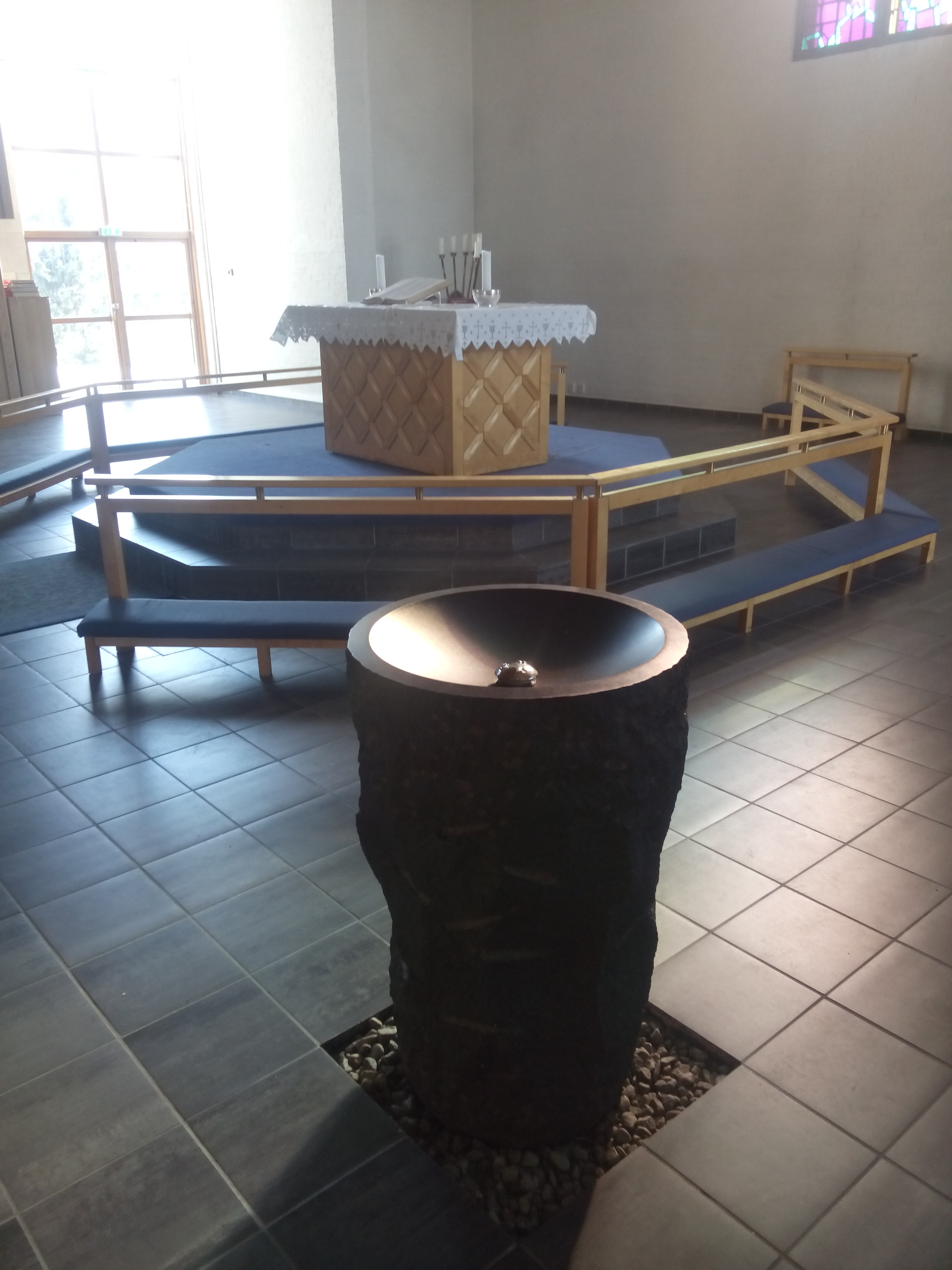

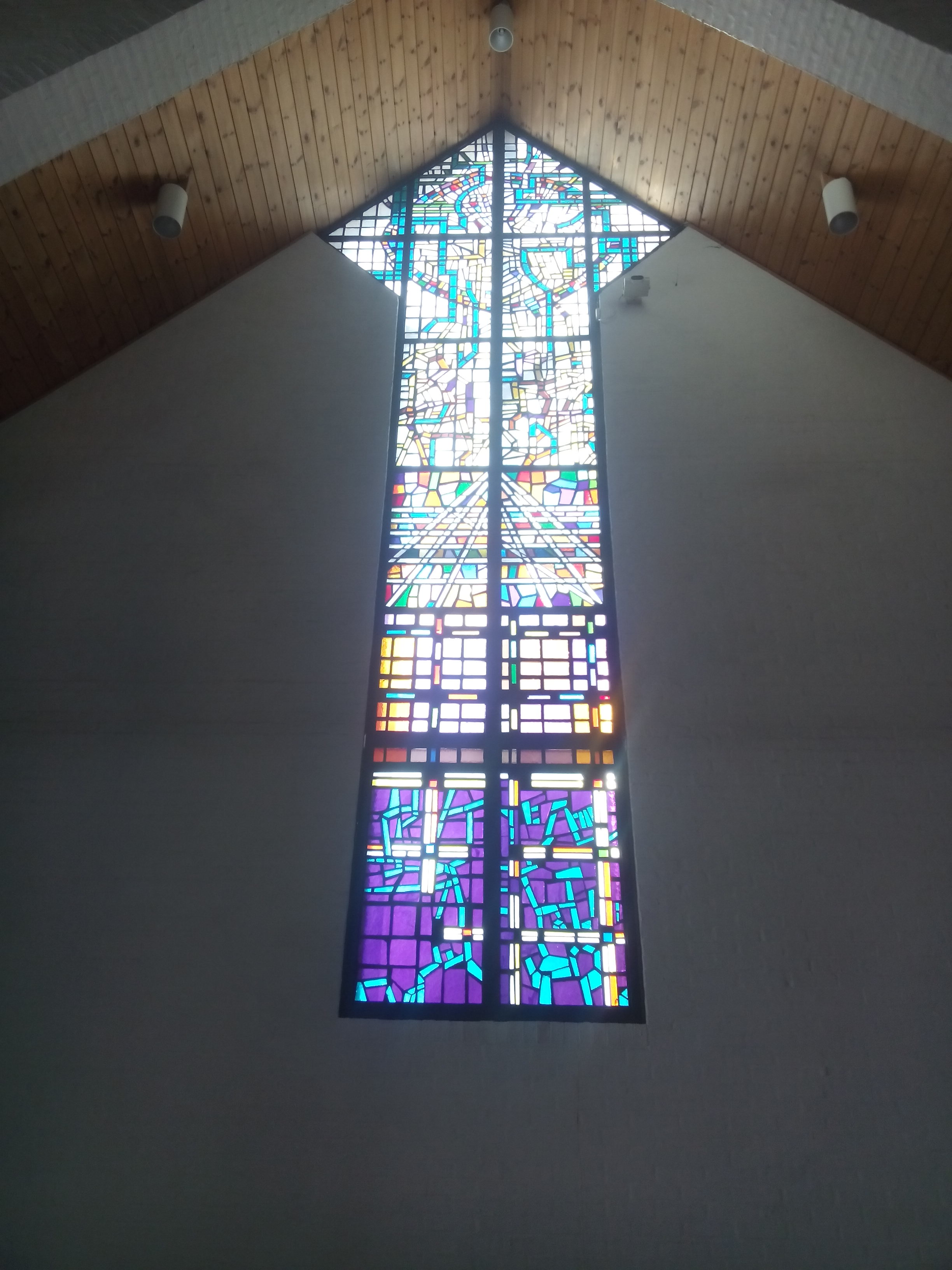

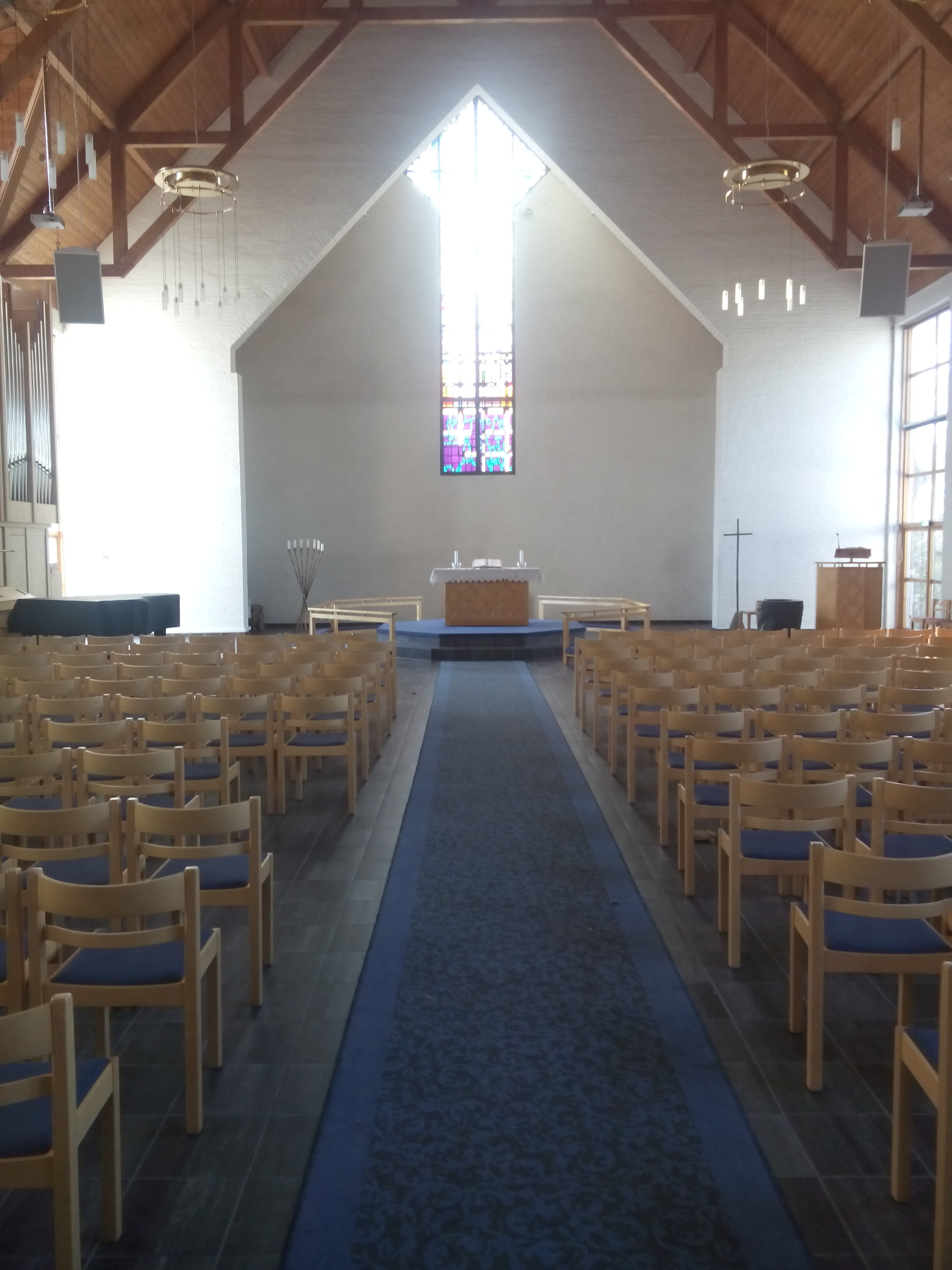

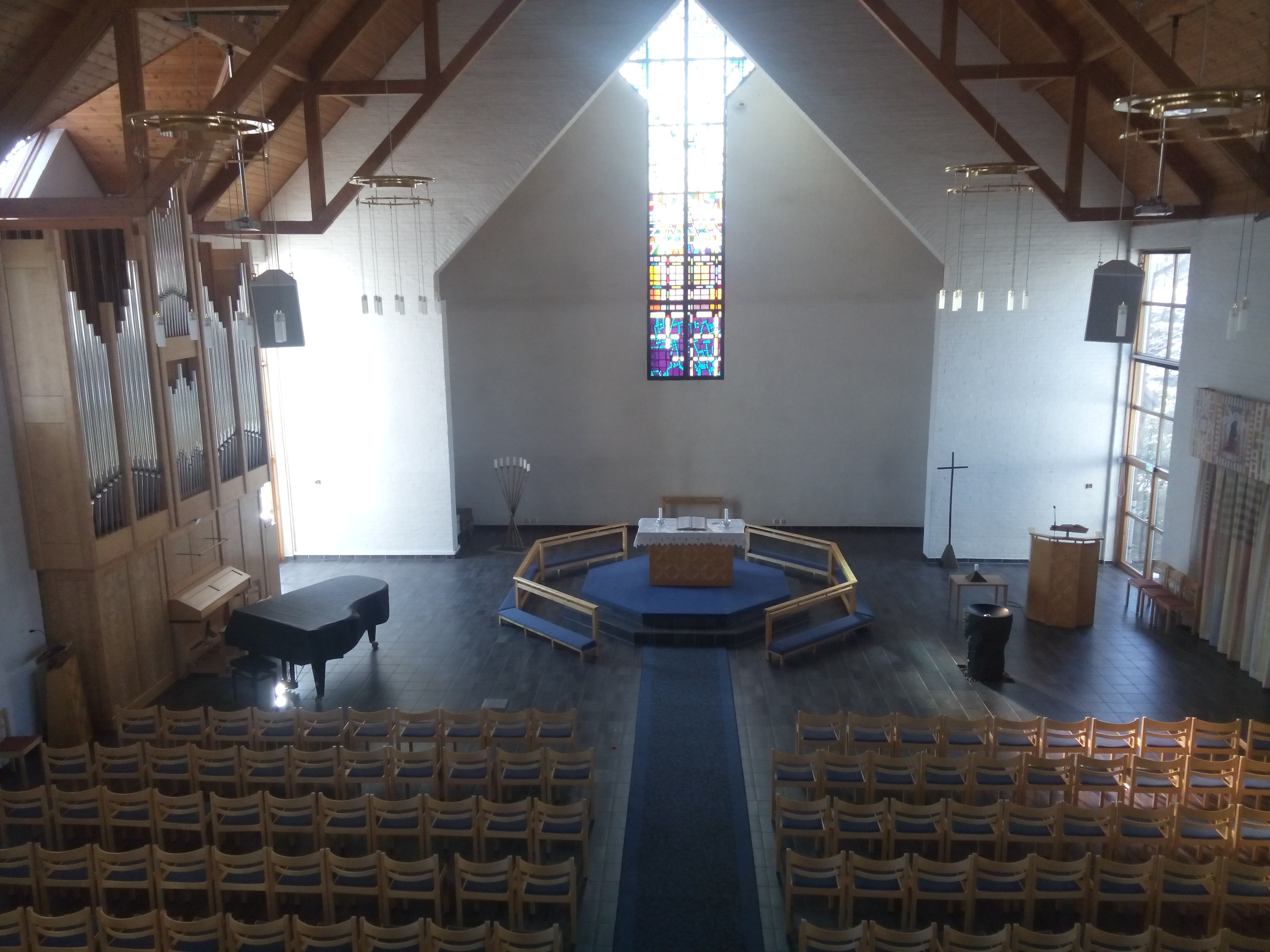

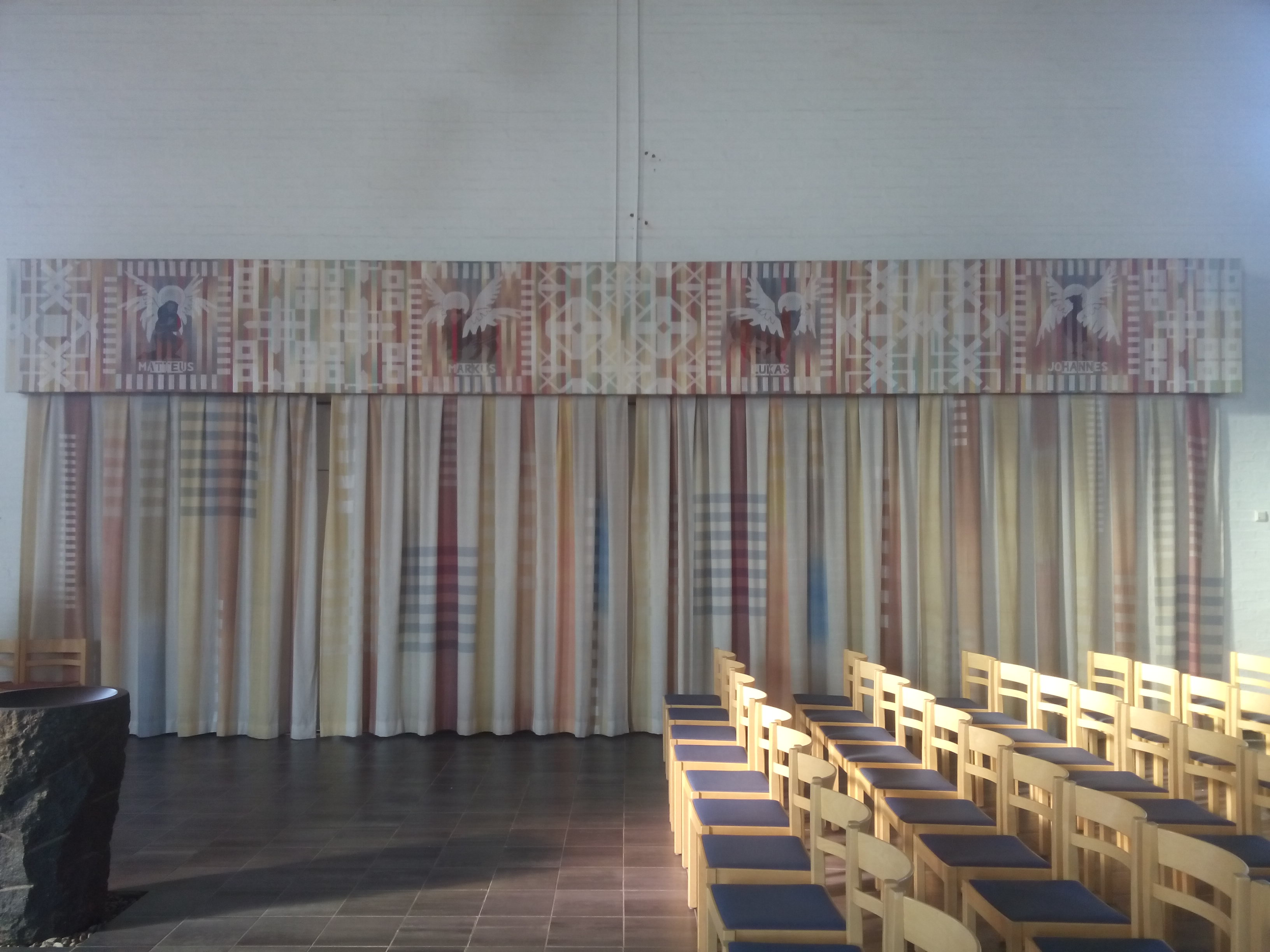

== See also ==
- List of churches in Bjørgvin
