= FIK BFG Fana =

Norwegian athletics club

- Full name: Friidrettsklubben BFG Fana
- Founded: 1987
- Ground: Fana stadion Fana

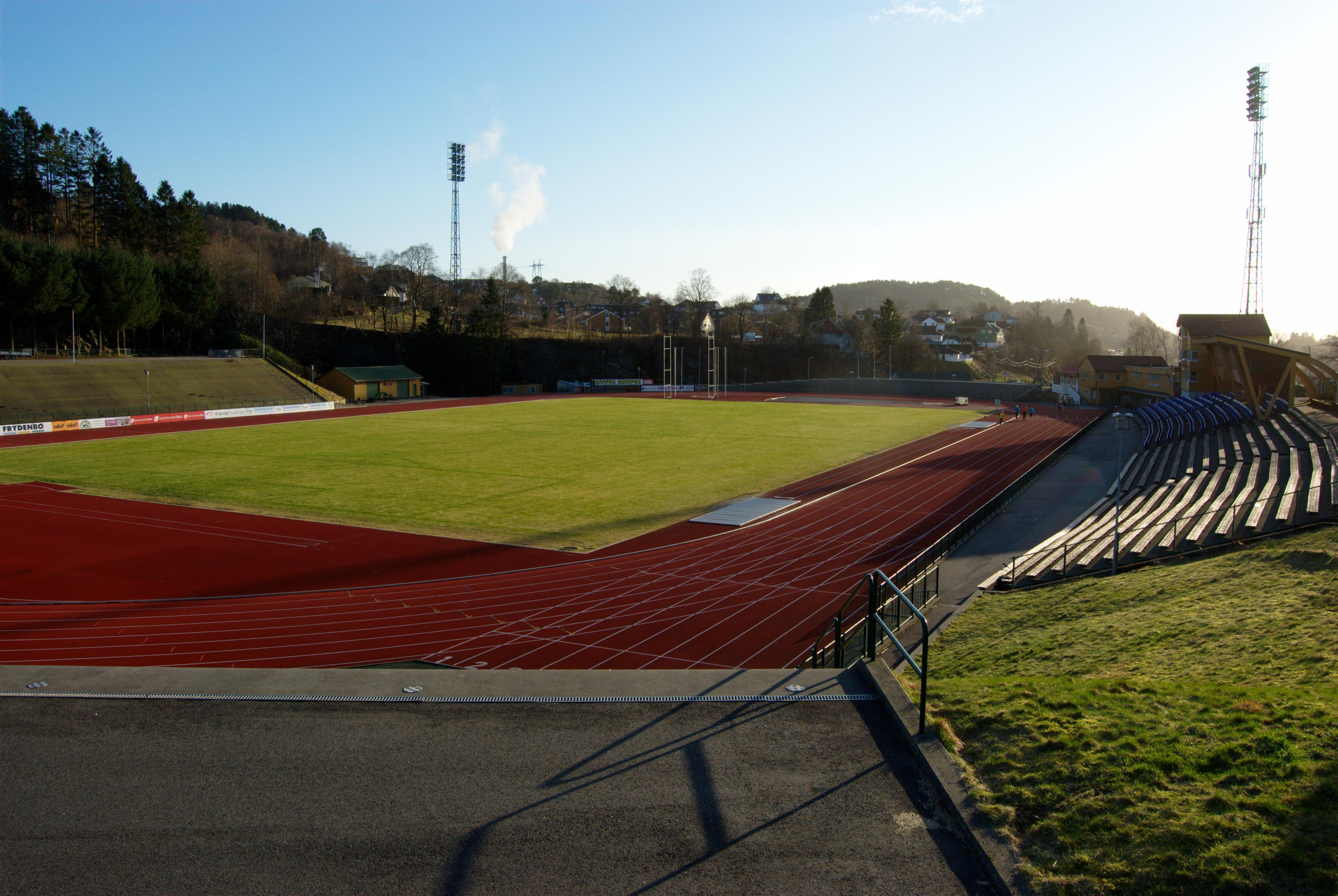
Fana Stadion

Friidrettsklubben BFG Fana is a Norwegian athletics club from Fana in Bergen, founded in 1987 as an umbrella team for Bjarg, Fana and Gneist.

BFG Fana uses the Fana stadion, and hosted the Bislett Games in 2004.

Among its most prominent members are marathon runner Stine Larsen, who represented Norway at the 2004 Summer Olympics. International 800 metres runner Atle Douglas has also represented BFG Fana. Mona Karin Riisnes, who holds two national records in relay races, both in 4 x 100 metres relay with 44.91 seconds from June 1994 in Istanbul and in 4 x 400 metres relay with 3:32.76 minutes from the 1991 World Championships in Athletics in Tokyo. Kirsten Melkevik Otterbu represented Norway in the 2008 Olympic Games in Beijing, finishing 34th at the women's marathon with the time 2.34.35 (PB 2.29.12)

In October 2012, Fana IL decided to withdraw from the umbrella team.
