= Tveita Senter =

Shopping centre in Oslo, Norway

Coordinates: 59°54′51.307″N 10°50′29.746″E

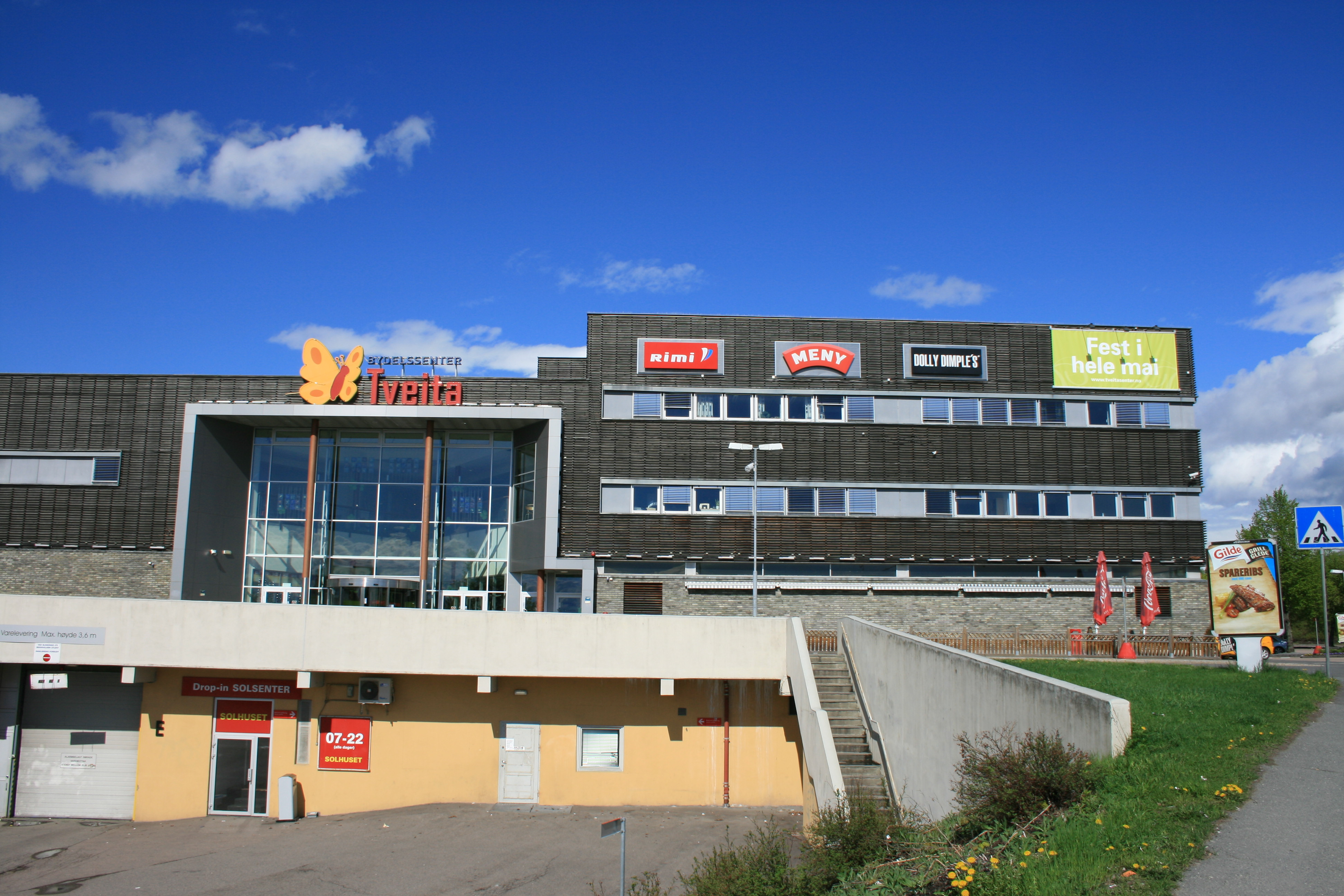
Tveita Senter

Tveita Senter is one of the largest shopping centres in Oslo, Norway. The shopping mall is located at in the neighborhood of Tveita on the border between the boroughs of Alna and Østensjø. It is situated beside Tveita Station on the Oslo Metro and is connected with five different bus lines. Tveita Senter is owned by OBOS Forretningsbygg AS (OBOS).

Tveita Senter was reopened in 2003, after a major renovation during which both its interior and exterior was rebuilt. The shopping mall appears as a modern mall, and is one of the largest and most complete shopping malls in the area. Its 73 stores includes a postal office, bank, pharmacy, liquor store and grocery stores, as well as a second floor containing several clothing stores. Since its renovation it has experienced a great increase in its turnover. In 2008 it was visited by 3.5 million people, with a turnover of NOK 768 million.

== Tveita Gang ==
During the 1970s Tveita Senter struggled with shoplifting, vandalism and drug addicts. In 1979 the board of directors chose to hire Jan Kvalen as its security guard in an attempt to rid the mall of people causing problems. Rather than calling the police, those who were caught shoplifting was often battered in the basement of the mall. Even though the police were aware that a lot of his actions went far beyond what the laws permitted, they chose not to interfere. Kvalen worked at the Tveita Senter for a period of two decades, in which a notorious criminal gang who came to be known as the Tveita Gang (Tveitagjengen) emerged under his reputed leadership.,
