= Lørenskog Storsenter =

Coordinates: 59°55′10″N 10°57′11″E

Lørenskog Storsenter (often referred to by its original name Triaden, or Triaden Lørenskog Storsenter) is a shopping centre in Lørenskog, Norway. The shopping centre was opened in 1988, and in 2005 it had a turnover of 825 million kr. It has over 80 stores in 27,000 m^{2} of building space on three floors. Lørenskog Storsenter was bought by Olav Thon in 1992.
