= Storo Storsenter =

Shopping centre at Storo in Oslo, Norway

Coordinates: 59.9473°N 10.7747°E

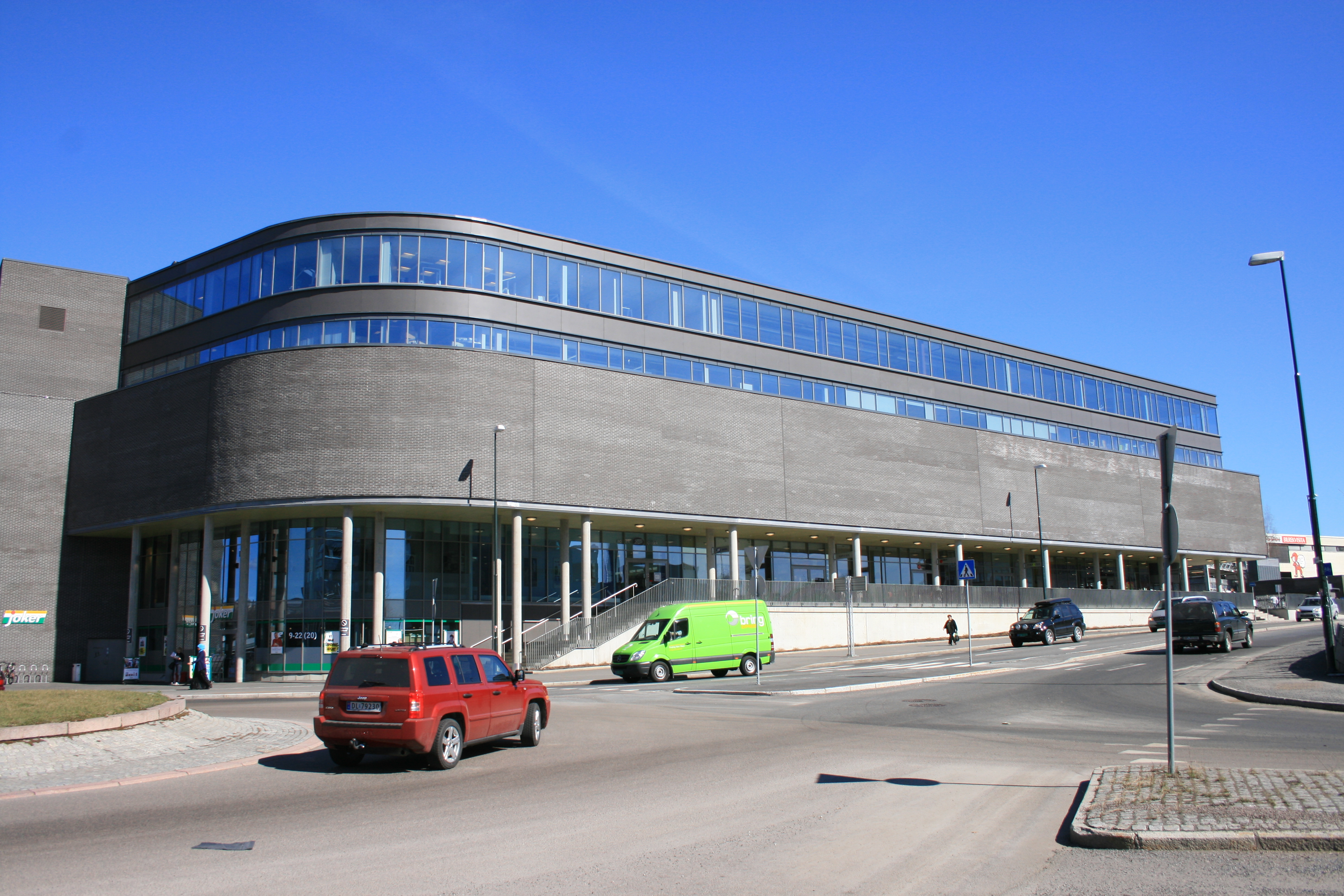
Storo Storsenter.

Storo Storsenter is a shopping centre at Storo in Oslo, Norway. In 2002, it had a turnover of 1,092 billion kr. It is now under full-scale renovation and expansion, and now has 120 stores, including local and international chains. It also has a number of restaurants, banks and hair dressers. Storo Storsenter is owned by Olav Thon Eiendomsselskap. It is located beside Ring 3 and Storo Station on the Oslo T-bane and Oslo Tramway.
