= Jessheim Storsenter =

Coordinates: 60°08′34″N 11°10′25″E

Thon Senter Jessheim
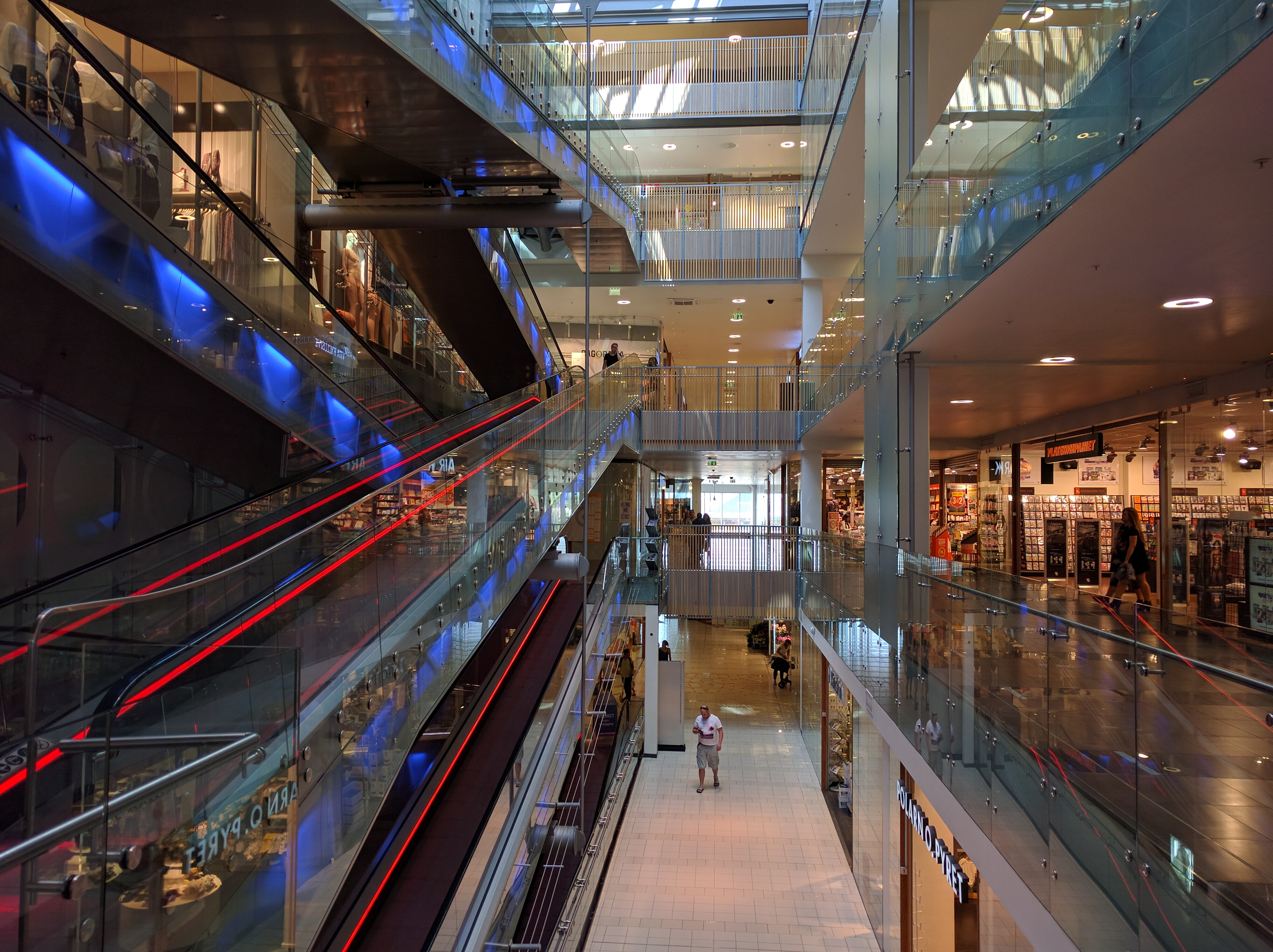
- Location: Jessheim, Akershus, Norway
- Address: Storgata 6; 2050 Jessheim
- Opened: 31 October 1968
- Renovated: 8 May 2003 31 October 2017 8 May 2026
- Previous names: Fakkelsenteret (1968–2003); Jessheim Storsenter (2003–2026)
- Owner: Olav Thon Gruppen
- Num. of stores: 144
- Floors: 5
- Website: thonsenter.no/jessheim

Thon Senter Jessheim, previously Jessheim Storsenter, is a shopping centre located in the centre of Jessheim, Norway. The shopping centre was originally opened in 1968 under the name of Fakkelsenteret. The name roughly translates as 'the torch centre' and it had a sculpture of the Roman goddess Vesta holding a torch that originally was lit by a natural gas flame.

On 31 May 1979 the HK-Senteret shopping centre was established next to Fakkelsenteret. It was built by Harald Kværner (HK) on the site of his grocery store. HK-Senteret was rebuilt in 1996, and was expanded in 1997 by Tore Kværner who at that point had taken over control of the centre. The new HK-Senteret reopened on 13 November 1997 and had space for 35 shops.

Olav Thon purchased Fakkelsenteret in 1998. In 1999 Thon and Kværner initiated a joint operating agreement whereby the two centres would be merged. The combination was known as Jessheim Storsenter, and opened on May 8, 2003, after reconstruction that merged the two centres into one large building.

After several expansions, the latest in 2026, the mall has now 144 stores. On May 8, 2026, Jessheim Storsenter was renamed Thon Senter Jessheim.

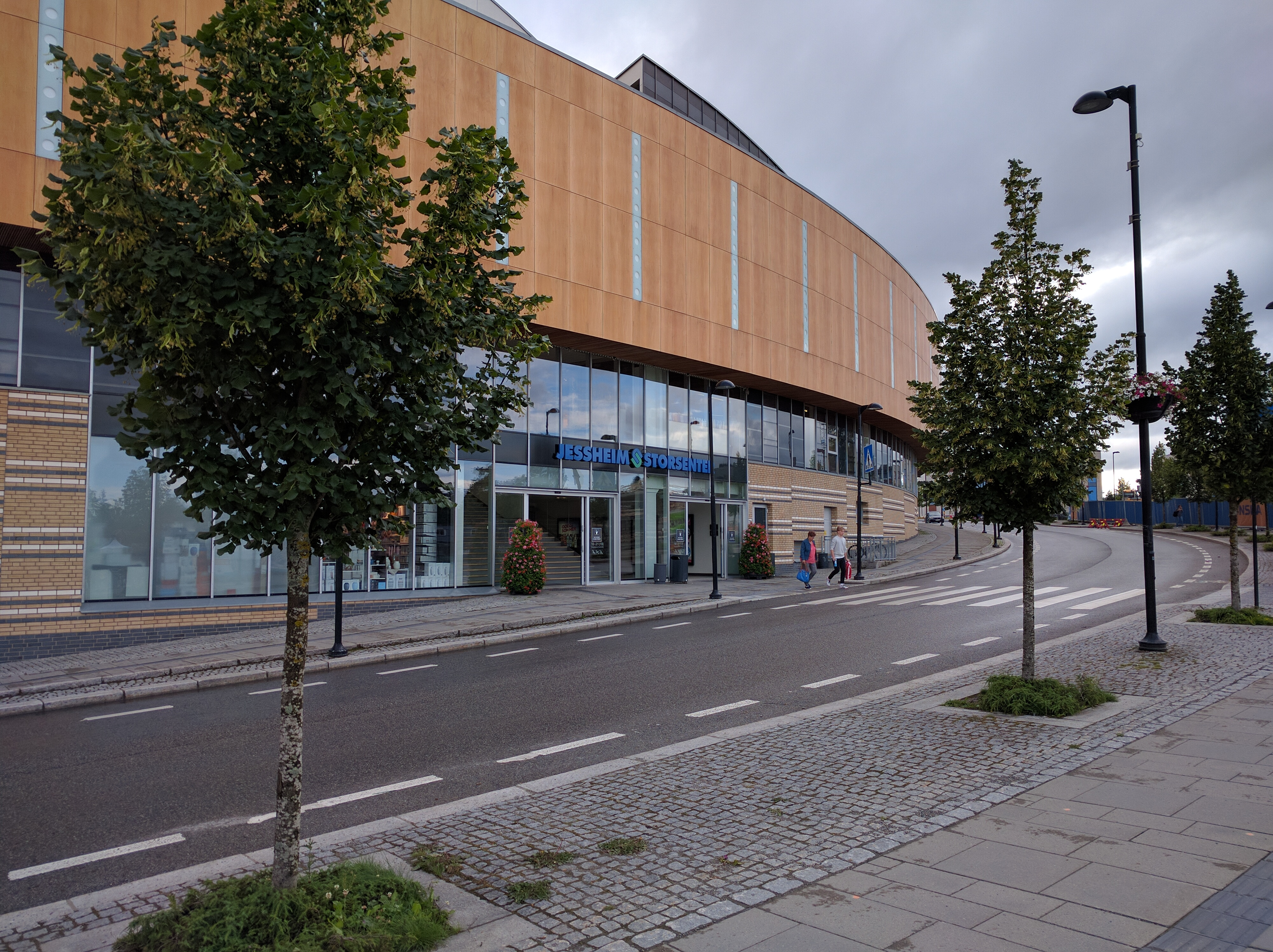
Exterior of the northern part of the centre
