= Bergen Storsenter =

Shopping centre in Bergen, Norway

Coordinates: 60.3891°N 5.33216°E

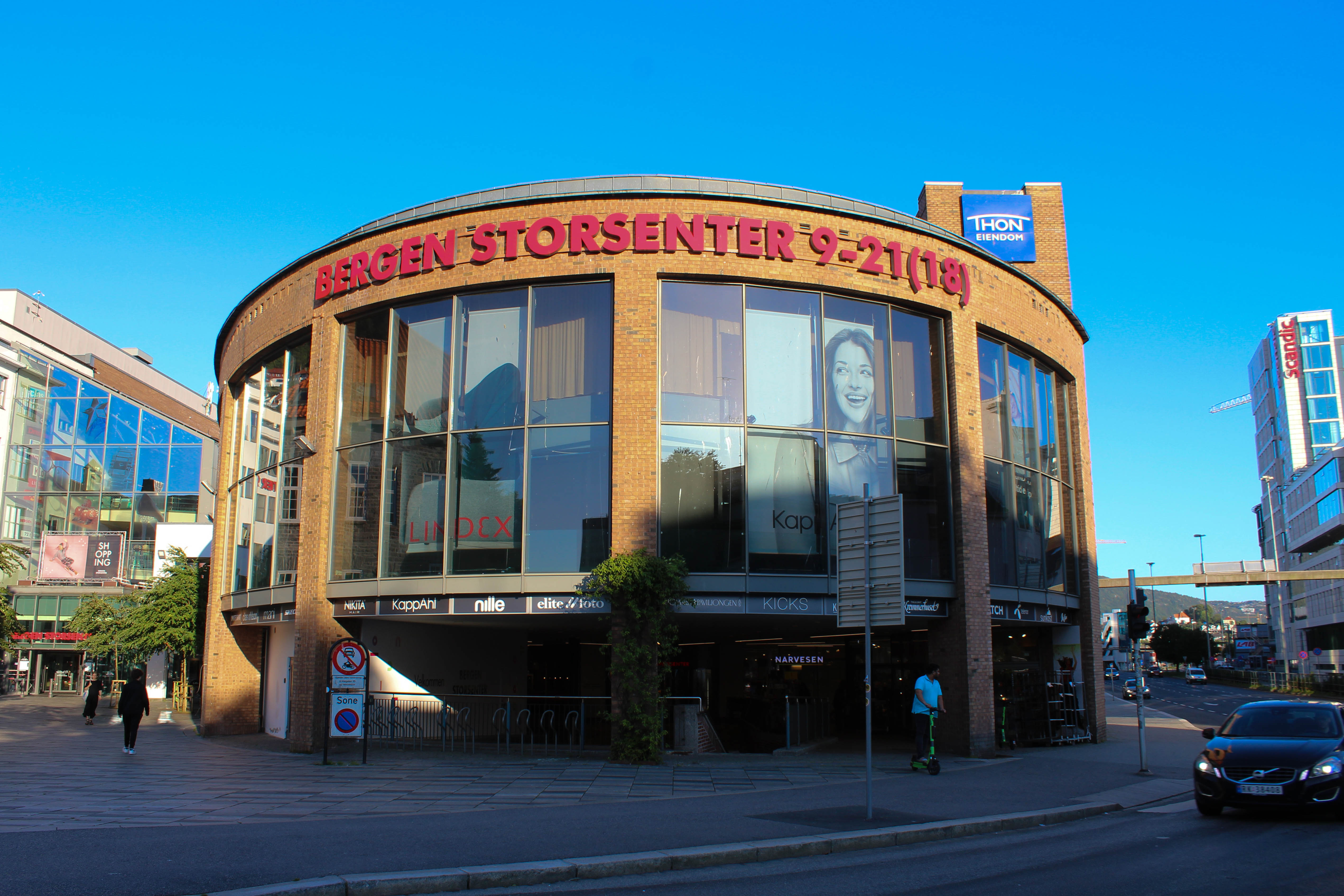
- Location: Bergen, Norway
- Opened: 1988
- Renovated: 1999
- Previous names: Bystasjonen
- Owner: Olav Thon Foundation
- Num. of stores: 72

Bergen Storsenter is the largest shopping centre in central Bergen, Norway, with a turnover of 1,024 billion Norwegian krone in 2002.

== History ==
The first shopping centre on this location opened on 11 March 1988 and was called Bystasjonen. On 19 March 1999 Bergen Storsenter opened, owned by the Olav Thon Group. The new shopping centre was built by joining Bystasjonen shopping centre with the building Kimhuset, which up until then had been used as first a shoe factory and later a furniture business. Olav Thon Gruppen had bought both Kimhuset and Bystasjonen in 1997. Compared to Bystasjonen, the number of stores grew from 38 to 72 with the completion of Bergen Storsenter. The centre was also noted for having the same chief executive since 1987, Ingunn B. Hansen, until 2015 when Odd Rune Bjørge took over.

Olav Thon Group (Olav Thon Gruppen) is owned by the Olav Thon Foundation (Olav Thon Stiftelsen). Olav Thon Group operates primarily in the retail and hotel sectors. It hold a position in shopping centers located in Norway and Sweden as well as Thon Hotels which is one of Norway's leading hotel chains.

== See also ==
- Lagunen Storsenter

== Bibliography ==
- Ertresvaag, Egil (2000). I støpeskjeen: ingeniørutdanning i Bergen 1975-2000 (in Norwegian). Bergen: Bergen University College. ISBN 8271283081.
- Johannessen, Nils-Emil (1999). Lærvarer og lærdom gjennom tre generasjoner: Johs. E. Johannessen porteføljefabrikk 1949-1999 (in Norwegian). Bergen: Jopo. ISBN 8299518903.
