= Kvadrat (shopping centre) =

Shopping centre in Sandnes, Rogaland, Norway

Coordinates: 58°52′35.94″N 05°43′17.29″E

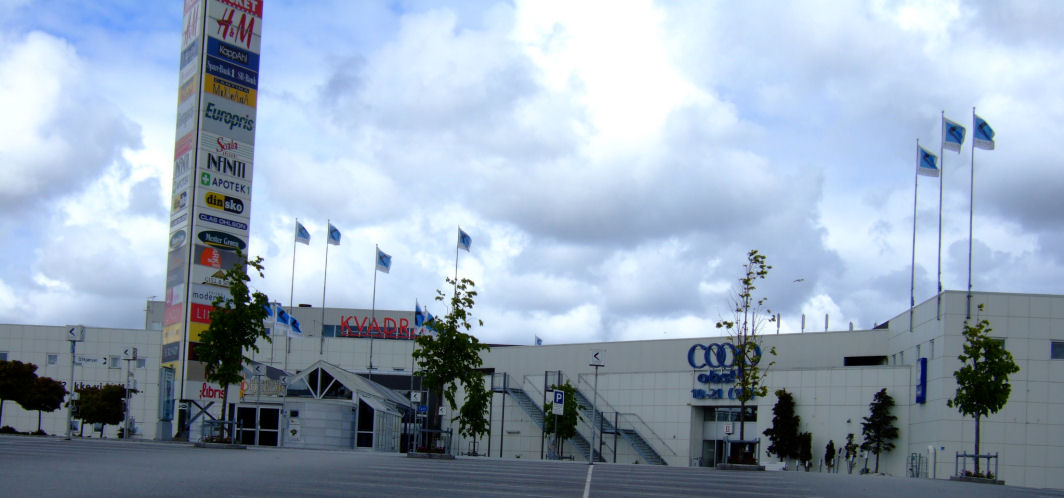
Kvadrat Kjøpesenter Foto:Jarvin

Kvadrat is one of the largest shopping centres in Norway both by revenue and number of shops. The shopping centre is situated in Sandnes, Norway. Kvadrat Storsenter was opened in 1984 and contains 160 stores in several connected buildings totalling 84 912 m^{2}.
