= Sørlandssenteret =

Thon Sørlandssenteret
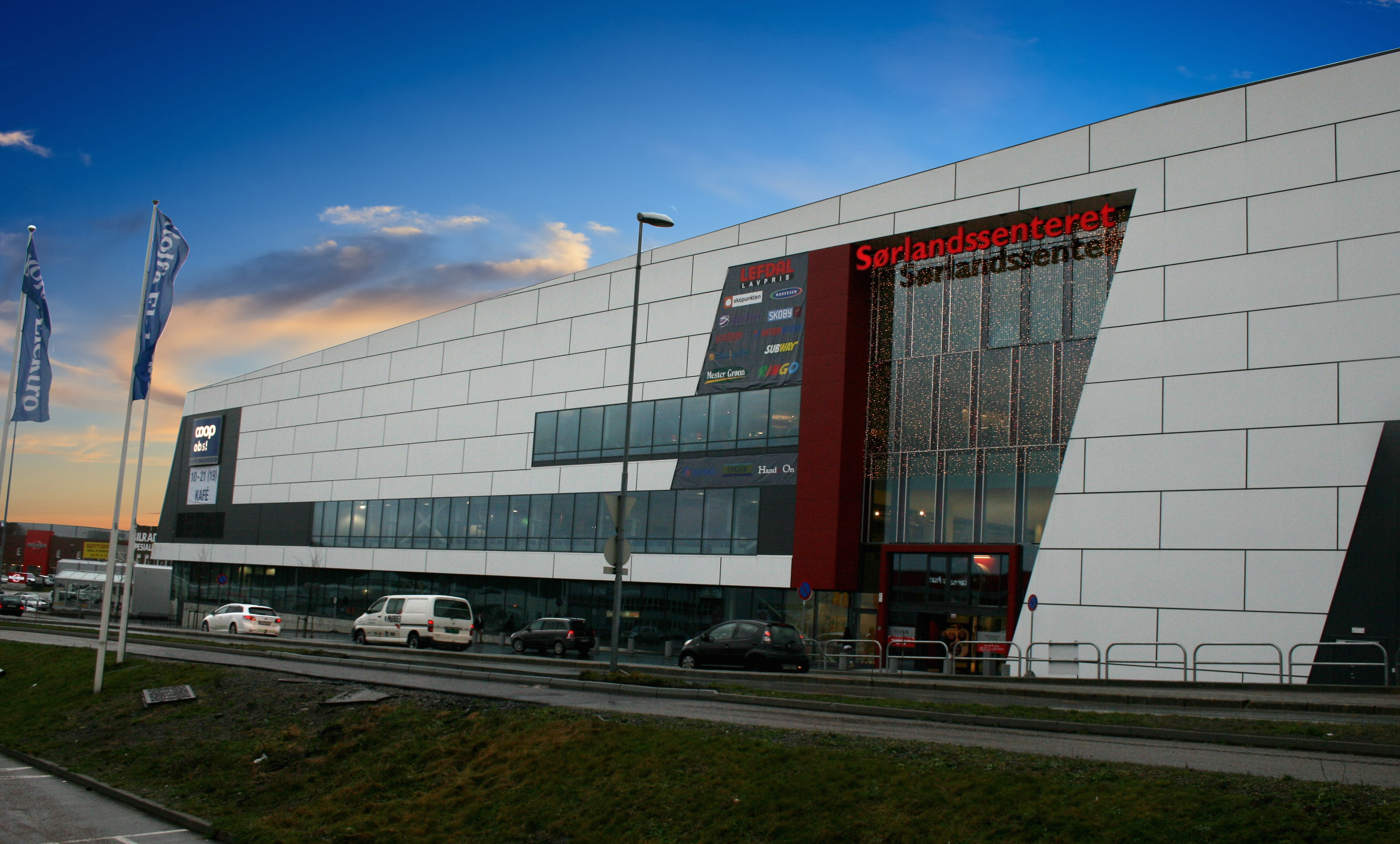
- Location: Kristiansand, Agder, Norway
- Coordinates: 58°10′47″N 8°07′53″E
- Address: Barstølveien 35; 4636 Kristiansand
- Opened: 1987
- Renovated: 1995; 2013
- Owner: Olav Thon Gruppen
- Num. of stores: 165
- Floor area: 83,000 m^{2} (890,000 sq ft)
- Parking: 3,000
- Website: thonsenter.no/sorlandssenteret

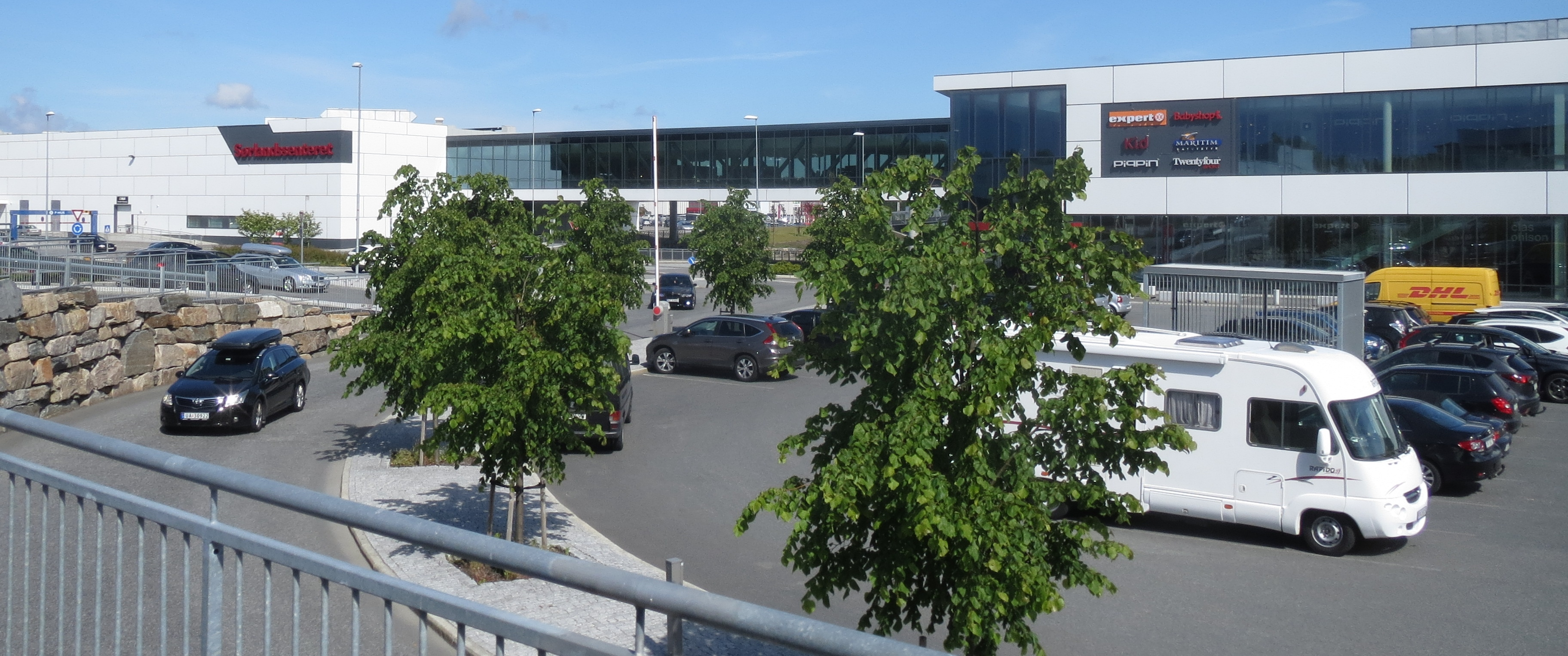
Sørlandssenteret

Thon Sørlandssenteret, previously Sørlandssenteret, is among the largest shopping centres in Norway and Northern Europe. It lies 12 km east of Kristiansand, close to the popular Kristiansand Zoo and Amusement Park. Sørlandssenteret was built in 1987. The mall expanded in 1995 and 2013. In 2005 the mall had over 3.6 million visitors. From October 2013, after extensive development, the center now has a surface of 83,000 m², there are 165 shops and 3,000 parking spaces.

In early March of 2026 Sørlandssenteret was renamed to Thon Sørlandssenteret.
