= Lagunen Storsenter =

Thon Senter Lagunen
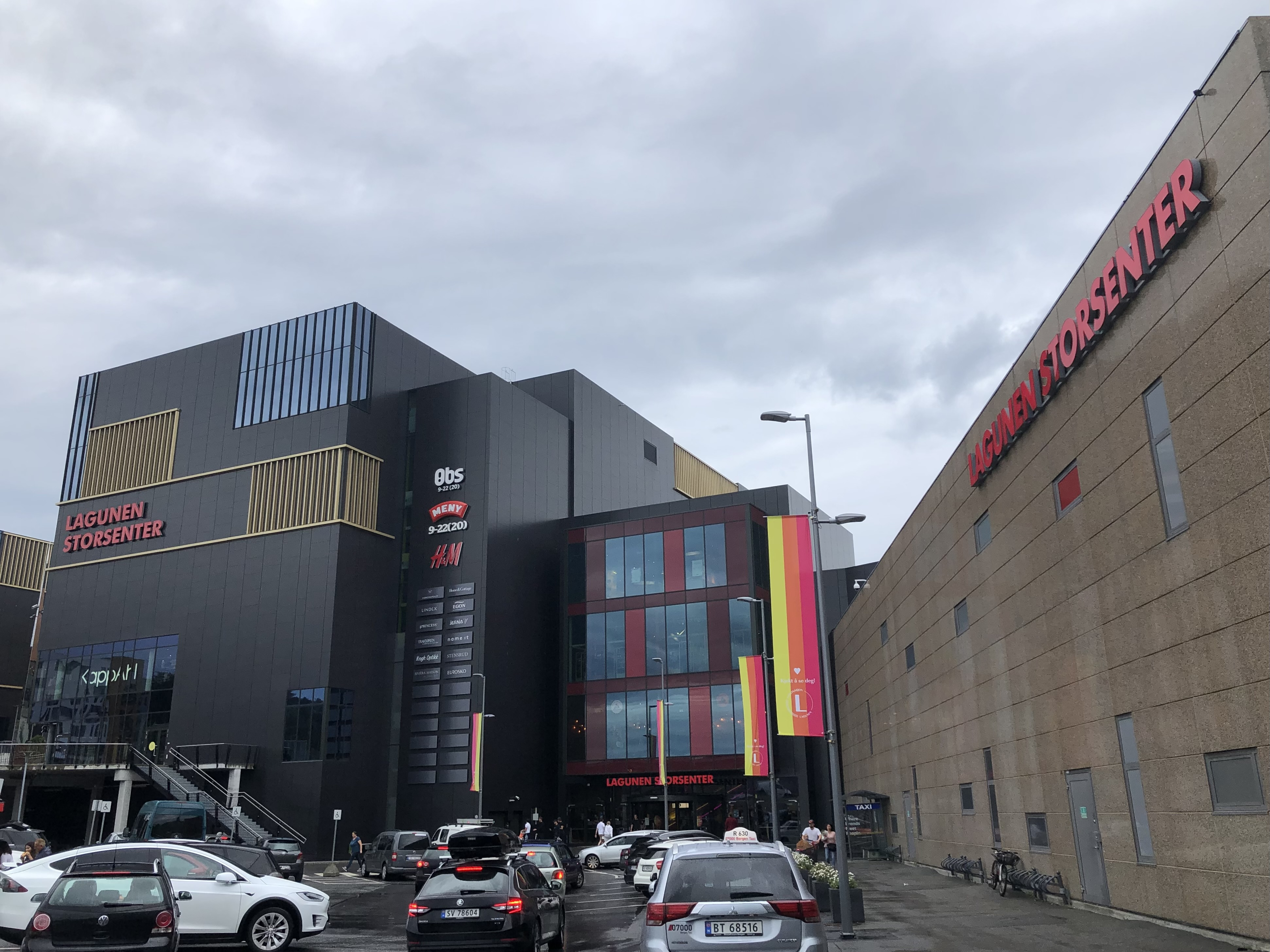
- Lagunen senter in 2020
- Location: Fana, Bergen, Norway
- Coordinates: 60°17′45″N 5°19′45″E
- Opened: 7 September 1985
- Manager: Olav Thon Group
- Architect: Jan Olav Reither
- Num. of stores: 199
- Floor area: 60,000 m^{2} (650,000 sq ft)
- Parking: 2,200
- Website: www.lagunen.no

Thon Senter Lagunen, previously Lagunen Storsenter is a shopping center located in the borough Fana in Bergen, Norway. It is one of the largest shopping centres in Norway and in 2002, it was the fifth largest shopping facility in Scandinavia, with a turnover of 2,540 billion Norwegian kroner. It has more than 150 stores in 150.000 m^{2} (1,614.59 sq ft) of building space. The shopping centre was designed by architect Jan Olav Reither (1929–2003) and opened in 1985. Thon Senter Lagunen is owned by Nordås Industrier AS and managed by the Olav Thon Group. In early March of 2026 Lagunen Storsenter was renamed to Thon Senter Lagunen.

== Gallery ==
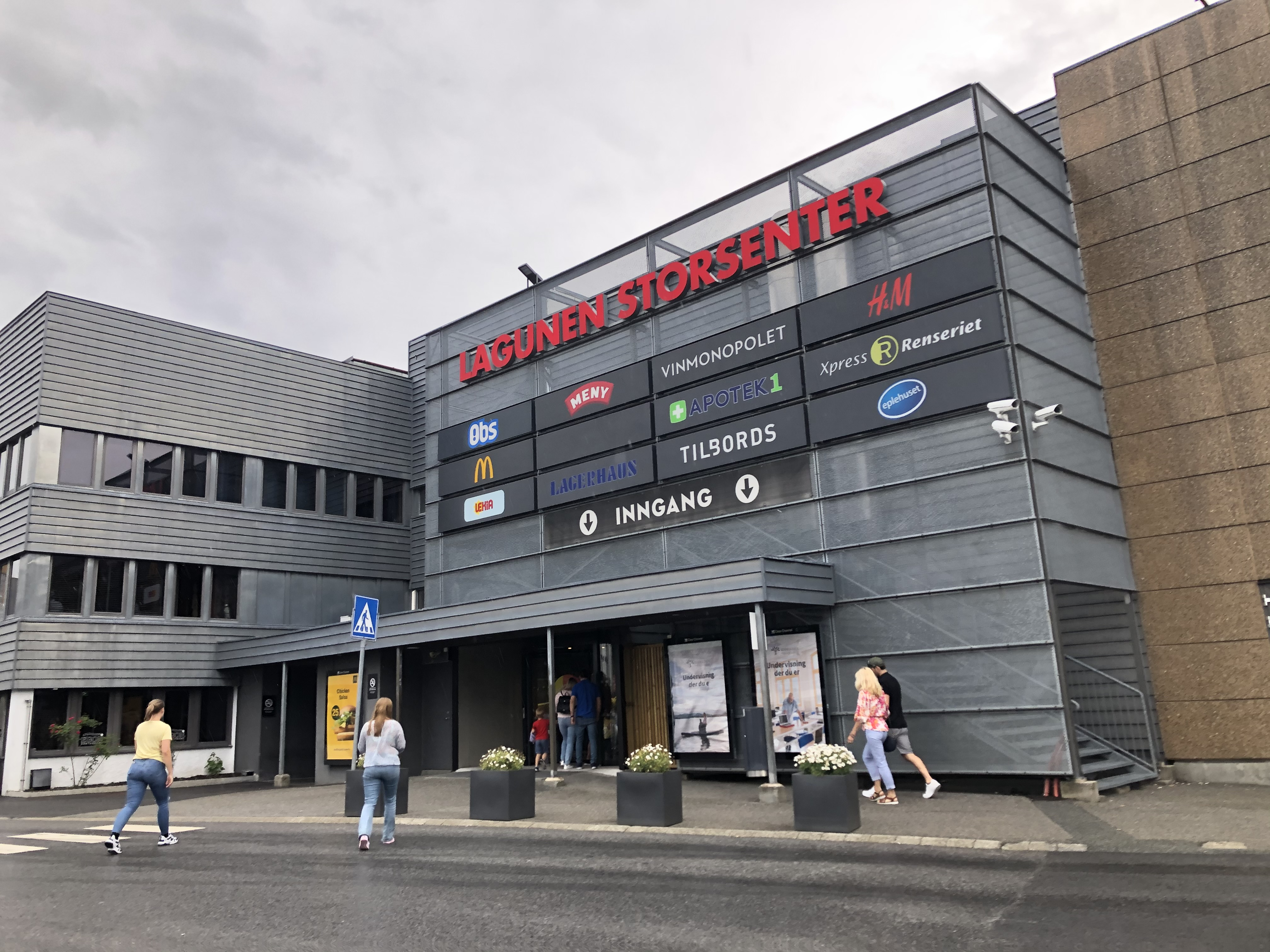
2020

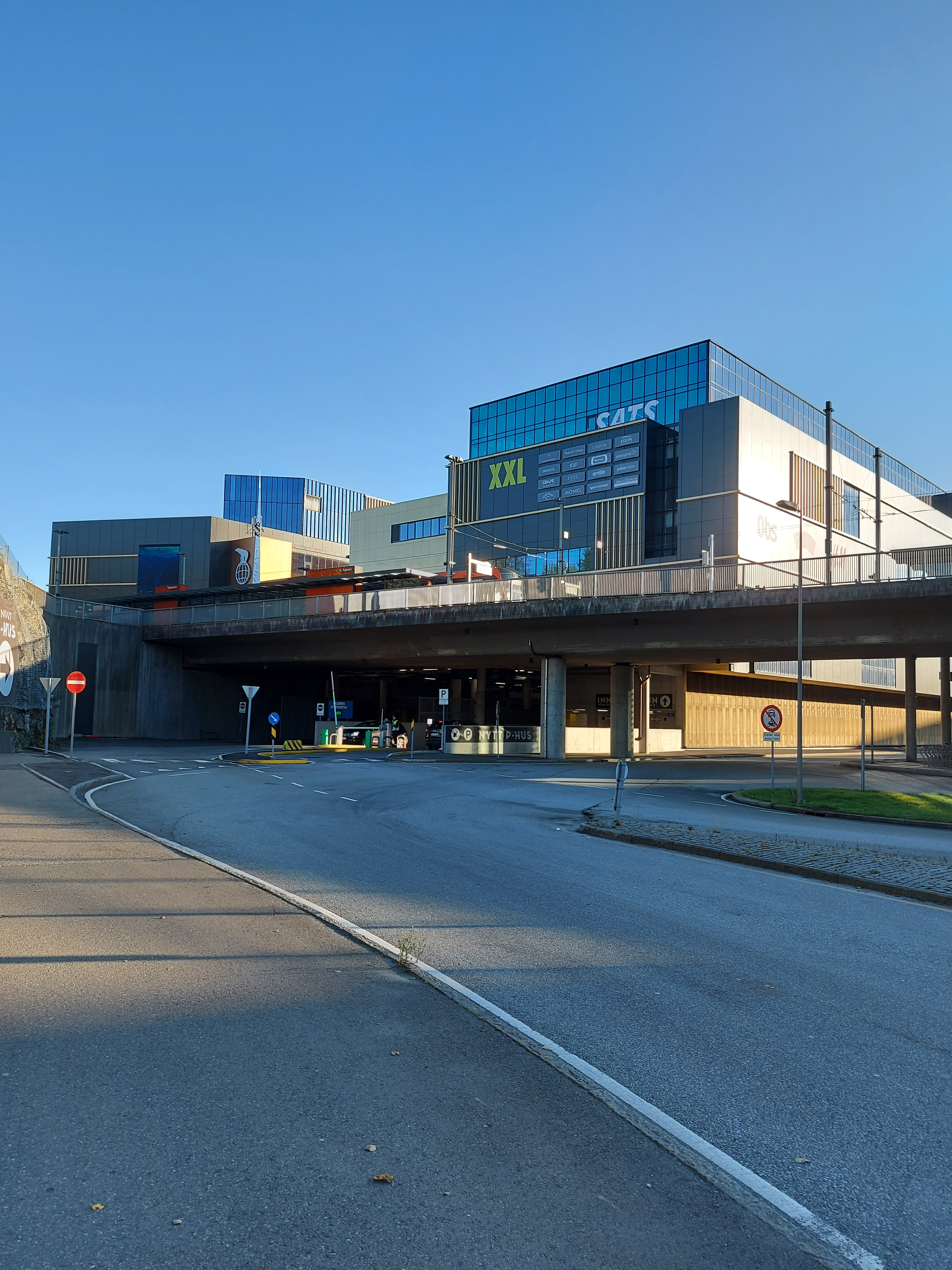
2020

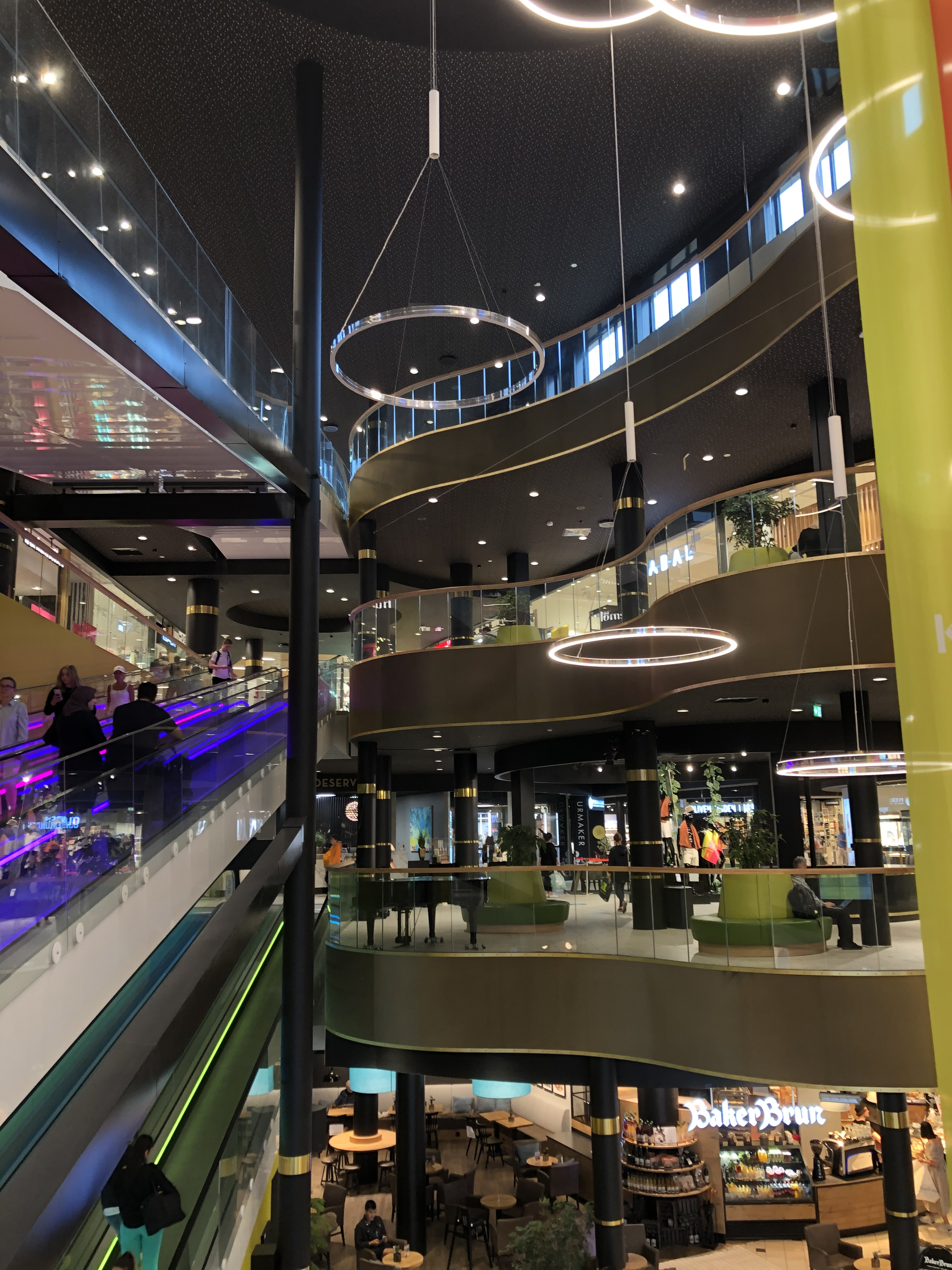
2020

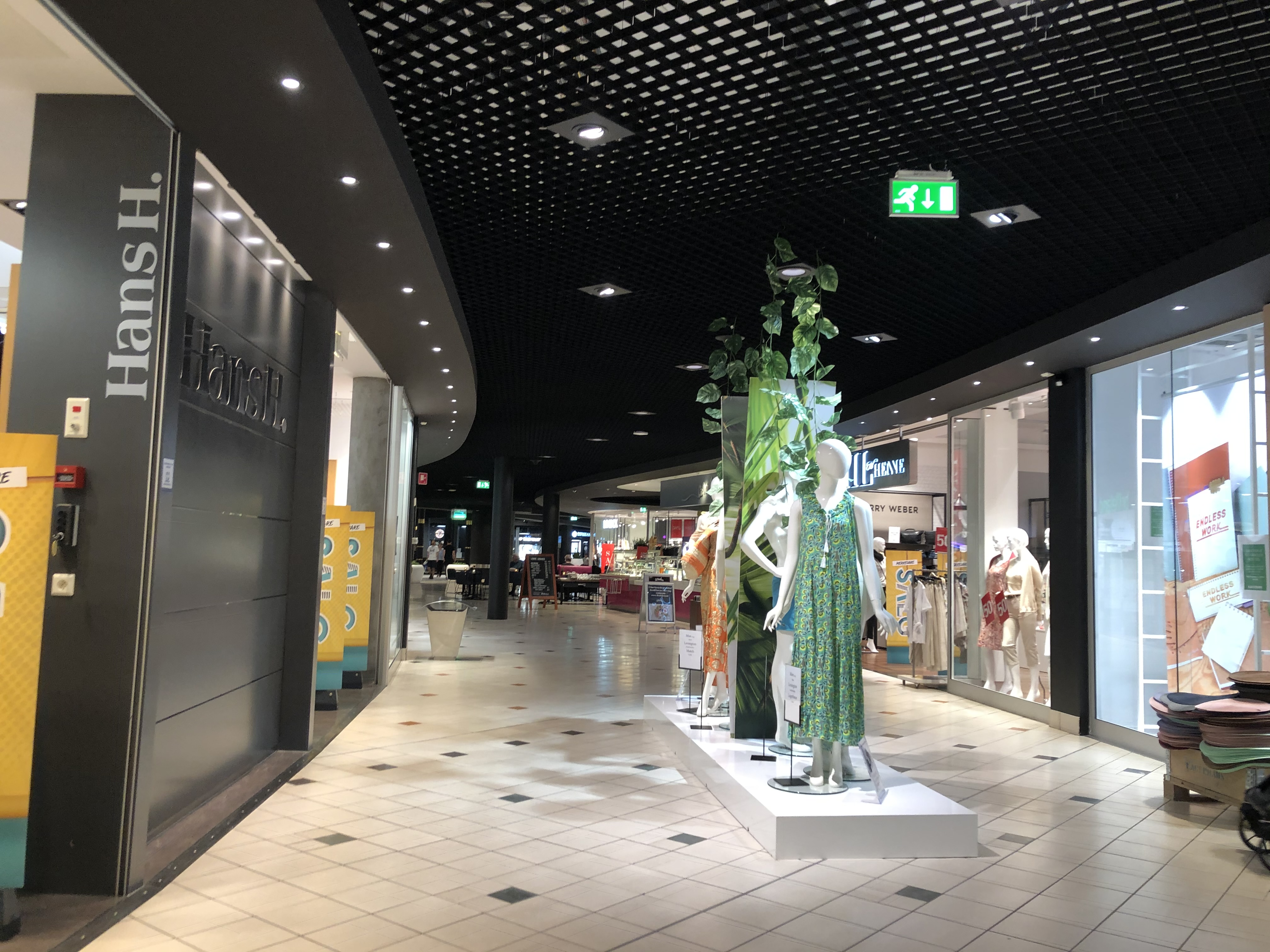
2020

== See also ==
- Bergen Storsenter
