= Granvin =

Granvin may refer to:

== Places ==
- Granvin (village), a village in Voss Municipality in Vestland county, Norway
- Granvin Municipality, a former municipality in the old Hordaland county, Norway
- Granvin Church, a church in Voss Municipality in Vestland county, Norway
- Granvin Fjord, a fjord in the Hardanger region in Vestland county, Norway

== Transportation ==
- Granvin Line, a former railway line in the Hardanger region of Norway
- Granvin Station, a former railway station in the village of Granvin, Norway
- MV Granvin, a vintage ship based in Bergen, Norway
