= List of ship commissionings in 1914 =

The list of ship commissionings in 1914 is a chronological list of ships commissioned in 1914. In cases where no official commissioning ceremony was held, the date of service entry may be used instead.

Date	Operator	Ship	Class and type	Pennant	Other notes
15 January	Imperial German Navy	Karlsruhe	Karlsruhe-class cruiser		
4 February	Imperial German Navy	Rostock	Karlsruhe-class cruiser		
10 March	Royal Navy	Iron Duke	Iron Duke-class battleship		
11 March	Royal Netherlands Navy	G 13	G 13-class torpedo boat	G 13	
12 March	United States Navy	Texas	New York-class battleship	BB-35	
23 March	Spanish Navy	Bustamante	Bustamante-class destroyer	B	
15 April	United States Navy	New York	New York-class battleship	BB-34	
2 June	Royal Navy	Marlborough	Iron Duke-class battleship		
14 June	Royal Netherlands Navy	O 4	O 2-class submarine	O 4	
8 July	Austro-Hungarian Navy	Prinz Eugen	Tegetthoff-class battleship		
15 July	French Navy	France	Courbet-class battleship		
15 July	Royal Netherlands Navy	K I	K I-class submarine	K I	
29 July	Royal Netherlands Navy	G 16	G 13-class torpedo boat	G 16	
30 July	Imperial German Navy	Grosser Kurfürst	König-class battleship		
1 August	French Navy	Paris	Courbet-class battleship		
3 August	Royal Netherlands Navy	G 15	G 13-class torpedo boat	G 15	
7 August	Royal Navy	Agincourt	Dreadnought battleship		
10 August	Imperial German Navy	Graudenz	Graudenz-class cruiser		
10 August	Imperial German Navy	König	König-class battleship		
20 August	Royal Netherlands Navy	O 5	O 2-class submarine	O 5	
August	Royal Navy	Erin	Dreadnought battleship		
1 September	Imperial German Navy	Derfflinger	Derfflinger-class battlecruiser		
8 September	Royal Netherlands Navy	Brinio	Brinio-class gunboat		
1 October	Imperial German Navy	Markgraf	König-class battleship		
3 October	Royal Navy	Tiger	unique battlecruiser		
7 October	Royal Navy	Benbow	Iron Duke-class battleship		
8 November	Imperial German Navy	Kronprinz	König-class battleship		
10 November	Royal Navy	Emperor of India	Iron Duke-class battleship		
16 December	Imperial German Navy	Glyndwr	Converted merchant type auxiliary seaplane carrier		Ex-SS Glyndwr
Date uncertain	Imperial German Navy	Adeline Hugo Stinnes 3	Converted merchant type auxiliary seaplane carrier		Ex-SS Adeline Hugo Stinnes 3

== Bibliography ==
- Preston, Antony (1985). "Great Britain and Empire Forces". In Gray, Randal (ed.). Conway's All the World's Fighting Ships 1906–1921. Annapolis, Maryland: Naval Institute Press. pp. 1–104. ISBN 0-85177-245-5.
