= List of ship commissionings in 1913 =

The list of ship commissionings in 1913 is a chronological list of ships commissioned in 1913. In cases where no official commissioning ceremony was held, the date of service entry may be used instead.

Date	Operator	Ship	Class and type	Pennant	Other notes
6 February	Regia Marina	Intrepido	Indomito-class destroyer	–	
11 February	Royal Netherlands Navy	O 3	O 2-class submarine	O 3	
April	Norway	Stord I	Passenger/cargo steamer		
7 April	United States Navy	Jupiter	Collier	Collier No. 3	Later became Langley (CV-1)
14 May	Imperial German Navy	Kaiserin	Kaiser-class battleship		
22 May	Imperial German Navy	Seydlitz	Unique battlecruiser		
22 May	Royal Navy	Centurion	King George V-class		
21 June	Royal Australian Navy	Australia	Indefatigable-class battlecruiser		
14 July	Austro-Hungarian Navy	Tegetthoff	Tegetthoff-class battleship		
31 July	Imperial German Navy	König Albert	Kaiser-class battleship		
19 August	Imperial German Navy	Prinzregent Luitpold	Kaiser-class battleship		
4 September	Royal Navy	Queen Mary	Unique battlecruiser		
15 October	Royal Navy	Audacious	King George V-class battleship		
31 October	Royal Navy	Ajax	King George V-class battleship		
19 November	French Navy	Courbet	Courbet-class battleship		
19 November	French Navy	Jean Bart	Courbet-class battleship		
Unknown date	Regia Marina	Indomito	Indomito-class destroyer	–	

== Bibliography ==
- Preston, Antony (1985). "Great Britain and Empire Forces". In Gray, Randal (ed.). Conway's All the World's Fighting Ships 1906–1921. Annapolis, Maryland: Naval Institute Press. pp. 1–104. ISBN 0-85177-245-5.
