= Stord =

Stord may refer to:

== Places ==
- Stord Municipality, a municipality in Vestland county, Norway
- Stord (island), island in Vestland county, Norway
- Leirvik (also known as Stord), a town within Stord Municipality in Vestland county, Norway
- Stord Airport, an airport in Stord Municipality in Vestland county, Norway
- Stord Bridge, a bridge in Stord Municipality in Vestland county, Norway
- Stord Church, a church in Stord Municipality in Vestland county, Norway

== Other ==
- HNoMS Stord, two ships of the Royal Norwegian Navy
- MF Stord (1970), a car ferry in Vestland county, Norway
- SS Stord I, a vintage Norwegian steamship
- Air Stord, a defunct airline based in western Norway
- Stord IL, a sports team from Stord Municipality in Vestland county, Norway
