= Norled =

Norwegian shipping company

- Type: Public
- Industry: Transport
- Founded: 2007
- Headquarters: Bergen, Norway
- Area served: Norway
- Services: Ferry transport
- Number of employees: 1,226 (2026)
- Website: www.norled.no

Norled (earlier Tide Sjø AS) is a Norwegian shipping company responsible for the group's ferry transport. Norled operates automobile ferries and fast ferries in Rogaland, Vestland, Sunnmøre and Trondheim Fjord on contract with the Norwegian Public Roads Administration, Kolumbus and Skyss. The company operates 45 car ferries, 17 fast ferries and one water bus.

The name Tide Sjø was first used by HSD Sjø AS after Hardanger Sunnhordlandske Dampskipsselskap had merged with Gaia Trafikk. In 2007 Tide Sjø merged with Stavangerske, its subsidiary Fjordservice and the Tide–Stavangerske joint venture Nor-Ferjer. After fissioning from Tide in December 2011, the company changed the name to Norled on 1 January 2012.

== Fleet ==
Vessel	Type	Built	Owned since	Car capacity	Pass. capacity	Status
MF Smørbukk	Passenger ferry	1964	2009		600	Spare ferry on the Oslo Fjord
MF Fjordgar	Car ferry	1967	2000	9	62	In service between Klokkarvik-Lerøy-Bjelkarøy-Hjellestad, until BNR took over 1 January 2012.
MF Ropeid	Car ferry	1969	1969	35	237	Spare ferry in Trøndelag
MF Hidrasund II	Car ferry	1969	2007	28	345	Spare ferry in Agder
MF Tysnes	Car ferry	1970	1970	25	162	In service between Kinsarvik-Utne-Kvanndal
MF Fusa	Car ferry	1970	1970	23	237	In service between Fjelberg-Sydnes-Utbjoa-Skjersholmane. Becomes a spare (or sold) after New Year 2010/2011
MF Austrheim	Car ferry	1971	1971	21	240	Spare ferry in Hordaland and Rogaland
MF Strandebarm	Car ferry	1971	1971	21	200	In service between Langevåg-Buavåg. "Utstein" skal etterhvert ta over. Blir da reserve, eller går inn i anbud lenger nord
MF Bømlo	Car ferry	1972	1995	72	350	Spare ferry Hordaland. Will take over Jondal-Tørvikbygd from M/F "Ølen"
MF Hidrasund	Car ferry	1972	2007	11	100	In service between Abelnes and Andabeløy
MF Fitjar	Car ferry	1973	1973	35	232	In service between Skånevik-Matre-Utåker. Becomes a spare from New Year 2010/2011 when "Ølen" takes over
MF Huldra	Passenger ferry	1974	2009		438	Spare ferry Oslo Fjord
MF Jondal	Car ferry	1974	1974	35	195	Spare ferry Hordaland
MF Rosendal	Car ferry	1975	1998	35/45	260	Spare ferry Hordaland
MF Sveio	Car ferry	1975	1996	26	200	In service between Sandvikvåg-Husavik until 31 December 2010, will the take over for "Fusa"
MF Utstein	Car ferry	1975	1975	36	240	In service between Jektvik-Nordhuglo-Hodnanes. Will eventually move to Langevåg-Buavåg
MF Kvam	Car ferry	1977	1977	34	145	In service between Larsnes-Åram-Voksa-Kvamsøya
MF Ølen	Car ferry	1977	1977	39/51	255	In service between Jondal and Tørvikbygd. Will eventually move to Skånevik-Matre-Utåker
MF Os	Car ferry	1978	1978	33	145	In service between Skjeltene-Lepsøya-Haramsøya
MF Kvinnherad	Car ferry	1978	1978	32/42	260	In service between Gjermundshamn-Varaldsøy-Årsnes
MF Etne	Car ferry	1979	1988	94	500	In service between Leirvåg and Sløvåg
MF Frafjord	Car ferry	1979	1989	34	255	Spare ferry Sunnmøre
MF Hordaland	Car ferry	1979	1979	54/64	298	In service between Skjersholmane and Ranavik. Will eventually move to Jektevik-Hodnanes-Nordhuglo
MF Austevoll	Car ferry	1979	1979	34/44	146	In service between Skjelten - Haramsøy - Lepsøy
MF Odda	Car ferry	1982	1982	57/77	290	In service between Skjersholmane and Ranavik
MF Strand	Car ferry	1982	1982	64	422	Spare ferry Hordaland/Rogaland during the winter. Tourist route on the Lyse Fjord during the summer.
MF Melderskin	Car ferry	1985	1996	112	395	In service between Bruravik and Brimnes until 31 December 2010, when Fjord1 took over the route
MF Boknafjord	Car ferry	1986	1995	106	450	Spare ferry Rogaland, sold to BastøFosen from January 1, 2011, becomes the 4th ferry on Horten-Moss
MF Ullensvang	Car ferry	1987	1987	106	399	In service between Stavanger and Tau
MF Stord	Car ferry	1987	1987	107	399	In service between Stavanger and Tau
MS Westcruise	Catamaran	1987			88	Used as a tourist boat in Rogaland under the Tide Reiser brand
MS Lyse Express	Catamaran	1988	1988		60	In service in Rogaland
MF Masfjord	Car ferry	1989	1998	108	485	In service between Halhjem and Våge until 31 December 2010, sold to Torghatten (FosenNamsosSjø) from this date
MF Rennesøy	Car ferry	1990	1992	115	399	In service between Krokeide and Hufthamar until 31 December 2010, then a spare ferry for Hordaland and Rogaland
MF Bjørnefjord	Car ferry	1990	1990	105	398	In service between Stavanger and Tau
MS Espeværekspressen	Skyssbåt	1991	1992			In service between Espevær and Eidesvik
MF Hjelmeland	Car ferry	1992	1992	85	400	In service between Hjelmeland-Nesvik-Ombo
MF Høgsfjord	Car ferry	1992	1992	76	400	In service between Hatvik and Venjaneset until 31 December 2010, then a spare ferry for Hordaland and Rogaland
MF Vikingen	Car ferry	1992	1992	64/86	399	Spare ferry Hordaland and Rogaland. Will eventually take over Skjersholmane-Ranavik from M/F "Hordaland"
MF Hardingen	Car ferry	1993	1993	62/86	399	In service between Utne and Kvanndal
MS Vøringen	Catamaran	1995	1995			In service between Norheimsund-Utne-Ulvik-Eidsfjord and spare ferry on the Austevoll route
MF Folgefonn	Car ferry	1998	1998	76	299	In service between Årsnes and Gjermundshavn
MF Finnøy	Car ferry	1999	1999	110	350	In service in the Høgsfjord connection (Lauvvik-Oanes)
MF Foldøy	Car ferry	1999	1999	48	200	In service in the "Nordre Finnøysamband"
MF Sjernarøy	Car ferry	1999	1999	48	200	In service in the "Nordre Finnøysamband"
MF Fedjefjord	Car ferry	2001	2002	42	130	In service between Fedje and Sævrøy
MF Fjordveien	Car ferry	2001	2001	79	299	In service between Skudeneshavn-Kvitsøy-Mekjarvik
MF Hidraferja	Car ferry	2001	2007	38	130	In service between Kvellandshella and Lauvnes (Hidra)
MS Tyrving	Catamaran	2002	2007		180	In service on Flaggruten (Bergen-Haugesund-Stavanger)
MS Tidebris	Catamaran	2002	2008		180	In service on Flaggruten (Bergen-Haugesund-Stavanger)
MF Stavanger	Car ferry	2003	2003	114	393	Out of service, to be sold
MS Fjord Molde	Catamaran	2005	2008		97	In service in Rogaland
MS Fjordbuen	Catamaran	2005	2005		50	In service in Rogaland
MS Fjordsol	Catamaran	2005	2005		97	In service in Rogaland
MS Fjordkatt	Catamaran	2006	2006			In service on assignment for Kolumbus
MF Folkestad	Car ferry	2006	2006	90	295	In service between Volda and Folkestad
MS Lysefjord	Catamaran car carrier	2006	2006	12	60	In service in Rogaland
MS Teisten	Catamaran	2006	2006			In service between Sunnhordland and Bergen
MS Tranen	Catamaran	2006	2006			In service in Sunnhordland
MF Ytterøyningen	Car ferry	2006	2007	38	160	In service between Levanger and Hokstad (Ytterøy)
MF Ørland	Car ferry	2006	2007	50	195	In service between Brekstad and Valset
MS Fjordfart	Catamaran	2007	2007			In service on assignment for Kolumbus
MS Fjorddrott	Catamaran	2007	2007			In service on assignment for Kolumbus on the route Stavanger-Sand-Sauda
MF Lauvstad	Car ferry	2007	2007	50	145	In service between Volda and Lauvstad
MF Sand	Car ferry	2007	2007	50	255	In service between Sand and Ropeid
MS Tedno	Catamaran	2007	2007			In service on the Austevoll route
MS Tidecruise	Catamaran	2008	2008		147	Used as a tourist boat in Rogaland under the Tide Reiser brand
MS Tideekspress	Catamaran	2008	2008		276	In service between Hareid-Valderøya-Ålesund
MF Tidefjord	Car ferry	2008	2008	120	350	In service between Hareid and Sulesund
MF Tidesund	Car ferry	2008	2008	120	350	In service between Hareid and Sulesund
MS Tidebaronen	Catamaran	2009	2009		250	In service between Lysaker and Nesoddtangen
MS Tidebaronessen	Catamaran	2009	2009		180	In service between Oslo-Vollen-Slemmestad
MS Tidedronningen	Passenger ferry	2009	2009		600	In service between Oslo and Nesoddtangen
MS Tidekongen	Passenger ferry	2009	2009		628	In service between Oslo and Nesoddtangen
MS Tidelyn	Catamaran	2009	2009		125	In service between Ålesund and Harøya
MS Tideprinsen	Passenger ferry	2009	2009		600	In service between Oslo and Nesoddtangen
MS Tiderose	Catamaran	2009	2009		147	In service between Molde-Helland-Vikebukt
MS Tidevind	Catamaran	2009	2009		147	In service between Langevåg and Ålesund
MS Tideadmiral	Catamaran	2010	2010		296	In service on Flaggruten (Bergen-Haugesund-Stavanger)
MF Tidefjell	Car ferry	2010	2010	120	350	Delivered from the shipyard November 2010. Route undecided but starts as a relief boat on Hareid-Sulesund
MS TideTBN	Catamaran	2011	2011		290	Will run between Bergen and Sogn/Selje
MV Ampere	Battery catamaran car ferry	2014	2014	120	360	In service between Lavik and Oppedal

== Hydrogen powered ships ==
Norled is adopting zero-emission technologies within its fleet of over 80 vessels. The company is modernizing its fleet to incorporate more low- and zero-emission vessels. In 2023, Norled launched the MF Hydra, the world's first liquid hydrogen powered ferry.

== See also ==
- Flekkefjord Dampskipsselskap
