= NSB El 11 =

Class of Norwegian electric locomotives

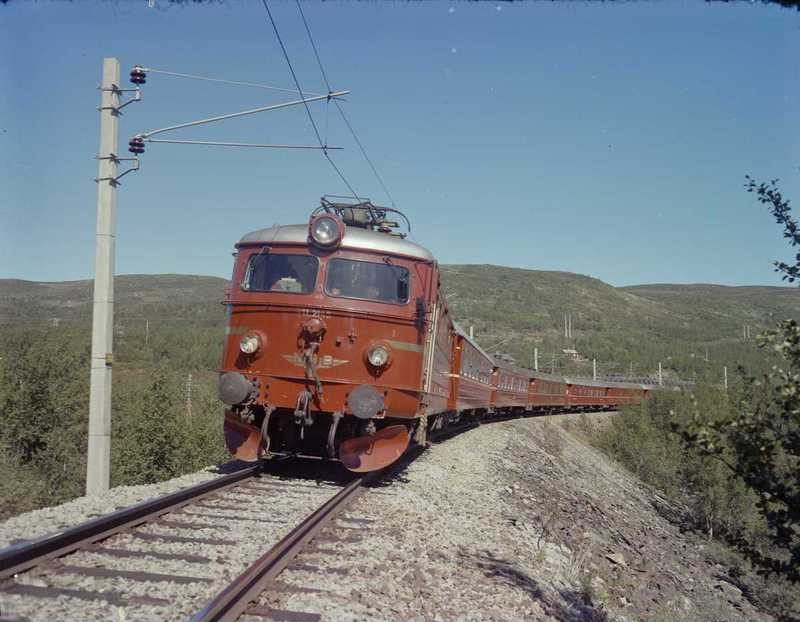
- An El 11 hauling a train on the Bergen Line in 1964
Type and origin
- Power type: Electric
- Builder: Norsk Elektrisk & Brown Boveri; Thune
- Build date: 1951–1956; 1963–1964
- Total produced: 41
Specifications
- Configuration
  - AAR: B-B
  - UIC: Bo'Bo'
- Gauge: 1,435 mm (4 ft 8 1/2 in) standard gauge
- Length: 14.45 m (47 ft 5 in)
- Loco weight: 62.0 t (61.0 long tons; 68.3 short tons)
- Electric system/s: 15 kV 16 2/3 Hz AC Catenary
- Current pickup: Pantograph
Performance figures
- Maximum speed: 105 km/h (65 mph)
- Power output: 1,676 kW (2,250 hp)
Career
- Operators: Norwegian State Railways
- Numbers: 11 2078 - 11 2112
- Locale: Norway

The NSB El 11 was an electric locomotive which was operated for both passenger and freight trains by NSB. It was the third type of Norwegian electric locomotive with bogies, after the NSB El 7 and NSB El 9. They were manufactured by Norsk Elektrisk & Brown Boveri (NEBB) and Thune mekaniske verksted. The first 35 engines were built between 1951 and 1956 and numbered 11 2078 to 11 2112, a second series of 6 engines, the El 11b, was built between 1963 and 1964 and numbered 11 2145 to 11 2150. The b-series had minor modifications such as a windshield consisting of two large windows instead of four small ones. A further upgrade of the El 11 became the NSB El 13 locomotive.

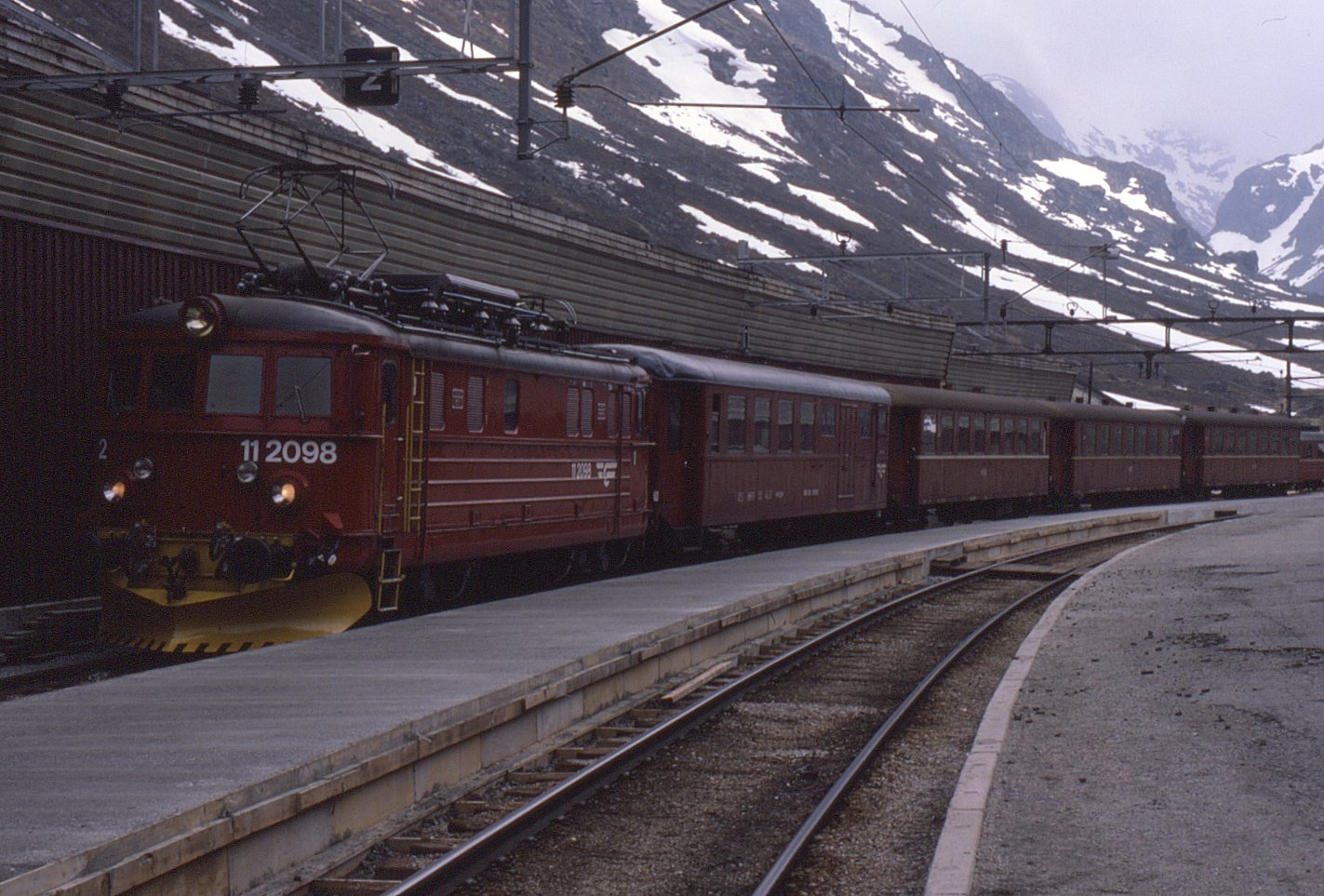
El 11.2098 at Myrdal Station in 1986

Between 1982 and 1983 three El 11s were upgraded for use on the steep Flåmsbana branch line. They have since been replaced by multiple units such as the NSB BM69 and, later, by locomotives such as the NSB El 17. The El 11s was withdrawn from service during the 1990s, with the last use in 1998. There are four preserved engines, two by the Norwegian Railway Club for use on special trains, and two by the Norwegian Railway Museum in Hamar.
