= NSB El 9 =

Retired class of electric locomotives

El 9
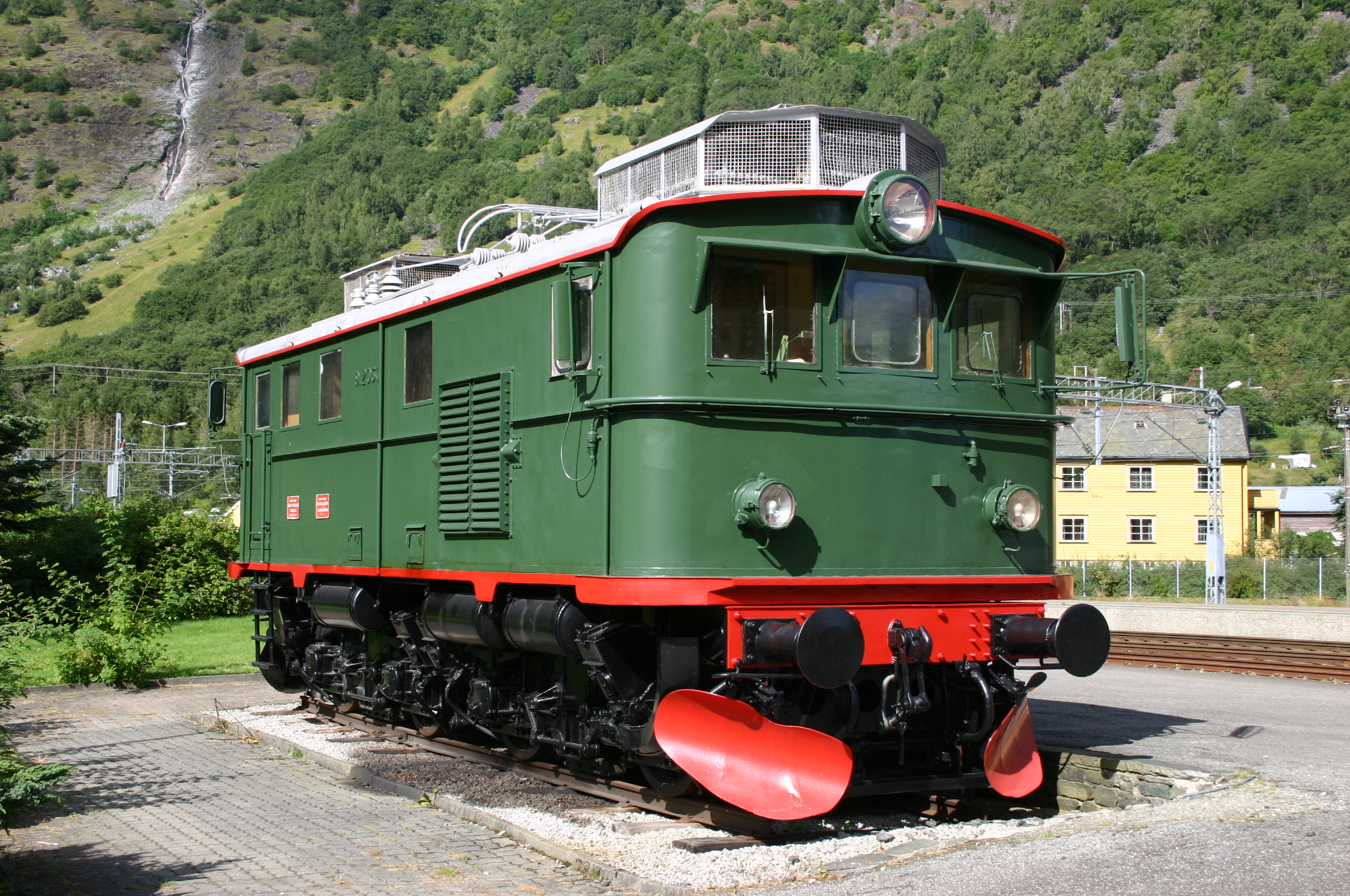
- El 9.2063 is preserved at Flåm Station.
Type and origin
- Power type: Electric
- Builder: Norsk Elektrisk & Brown Boveri
- Build date: 1944
Specifications
- Configuration
  - UIC: Bo'Bo'
- Length: 10.2 m (33 ft 6 in)
- Loco weight: 48 t (47 long tons; 53 short tons)
- Electric system/s: 15 kV 16.7 Hz Catenary
- Current pickup: Pantograph
Performance figures
- Maximum speed: 60 km/h (37 mph)
- Power output: 712 kW (955 hp)
- Tractive effort: 108 kN (24,000 lbf)
Career
- Operators: Norwegian State Railways
- Number in class: 3
- Numbers: 2062–2064
- First run: 1947
- Disposition: Retired; two preserved, one scrapped

NSB El 9 is a retired class of three electric locomotives built by Thune for the Norwegian State Railways (NSB), with electrical equipment from Norsk Elektrisk & Brown Boveri (NEBB) and Per Kure. The locomotives were delivered in 1947 after a three-year delay caused by wartime sabotage in response to the German occupation of Norway. They were used nearly exclusively on the Flåm Line and Hardanger Line, two steep branch lines. The units were used on the Flåm Line until 1983, when they were replaced by El 11. They were then used as shunters until being retired in 1988. Two of the locomotives have been preserved.

The class was custom-made for steep hills and slow speeds; it featured a low 48 tonnes (47 long tons; 53 short tons) weight which, with a Bo'Bo' wheel arrangement, allows for a 12-tonne (12-long-ton; 13-short-ton) axle load. This made the locomotives only 10.2 meters (33 ft) long. They had a power output of 712 kilowatts (955 hp), a tractive effort of 108 kilonewtons (24,000 lb_{f}) and a maximum speed of 60 kilometres per hour (37 mph). They were given road numbers 2062 though 2064.

== History ==
With the construction of the Bergen Line, which was completed in 1909, it was decided that there would be built branch lines to two fjords, the Hardanger Line to Hardangerfjord and the Flåm Line to Sognefjord. Both branches were steep and curvy, which set high demands on the locomotives. The Hardanger Line was 27.45 kilometers (17.06 mi) long, had a maximum gradient of 4.5 percent, a minimum curve radius of 180 meters (590 ft), and a maximum speed of 40 km/h (25 mph). The Flåm Line is 20.20 kilometers (12.55 mi) long, had a maximum gradient of 5.5. percent, a minimum curve radius of 130 meters (430 ft) and a maximum speed of 40 km/h (25 mph) uphill and 30 km/h (19 mph) downhill. Both lines had a maximum permitted axle load of 12 tonnes (12 long tons; 13 short tons), standard gauge and a 15 kV 16.7 Hz AC electrification system. The Hardanger Line opened in 1935 and the Flåm Line in 1940, although the latter did not receive electric traction until 1944.

Originally, the Hardanger Line used Class 64 electric multiple units. On 28 March 1940, NSB sent an invitation to tender for two multiple units which would be similar to Class 64. The company asked both for aluminum and steel bids. However, NSB abandoned the plans and instead signed an agreement on 4 October 1940 for delivery of three electric locomotives. The units were intended to be delivered in 1942. The mechanical components and assembly was done by Thune, and electrical parts were delivered by NEBB, except the transformer and electric controllers, which were built by Per Kure.

By 1944, by which time Norway was occupied by Germany as part of the Second World War, overhead wire had been installed on the Flåm Line. The locomotives at Thune and nearly completed, except for the transformers, which were at Per Kure. This was during the height of resistance sabotage, and workers at Per Kure had joined the communist resistance group Osvald. Because of the Allied bombing of Germany, Per Kure was thought to become part of a decentralized production chain and would be set to assemble aircraft engines. Osvald considered the plant a legitimate target and on 30 May 1944, the factory was blown up and the transformers severely damaged. Reconstruction of them took considerable time, in part because of the general lack of materials, and in part because the head engineer for the project disappeared during late 1944. In 1945, all three locomotives were sent to Myrdal Station for storage until the transformers were finished.

The locomotives received transformers in 1947, which were installed in Oslo, and 2064 was delivered on 24 May. The cost of the three locomotives was 1,297,905 million Norwegian krone. At first, only one unit was transferred to Flåm. The other two remained in Eastern Norway; one was stationed as a shunter at Oslo West Station, the other in Skien. The units operating in Oslo and Skien had problems with the rheostatic brake operating differently depending on the direction the train was running, something which was not observed in Flåm. The issue was fixed by marginally changing the excitation voltage. The unit stationed in Flåm was periodically sent for service in Oslo, and when this happened, a new unit would be stationed in Flåm. From 21 January 1949, 2064 was returned to Flåm without the other unit being sent back. From 17 February 1955, all three were stationed in Flåm. During the late 1950s, one of the units was stationed as Voss Station for shunting duty. Starting in the late 1950s, the class was also used on the Hardanger Line.

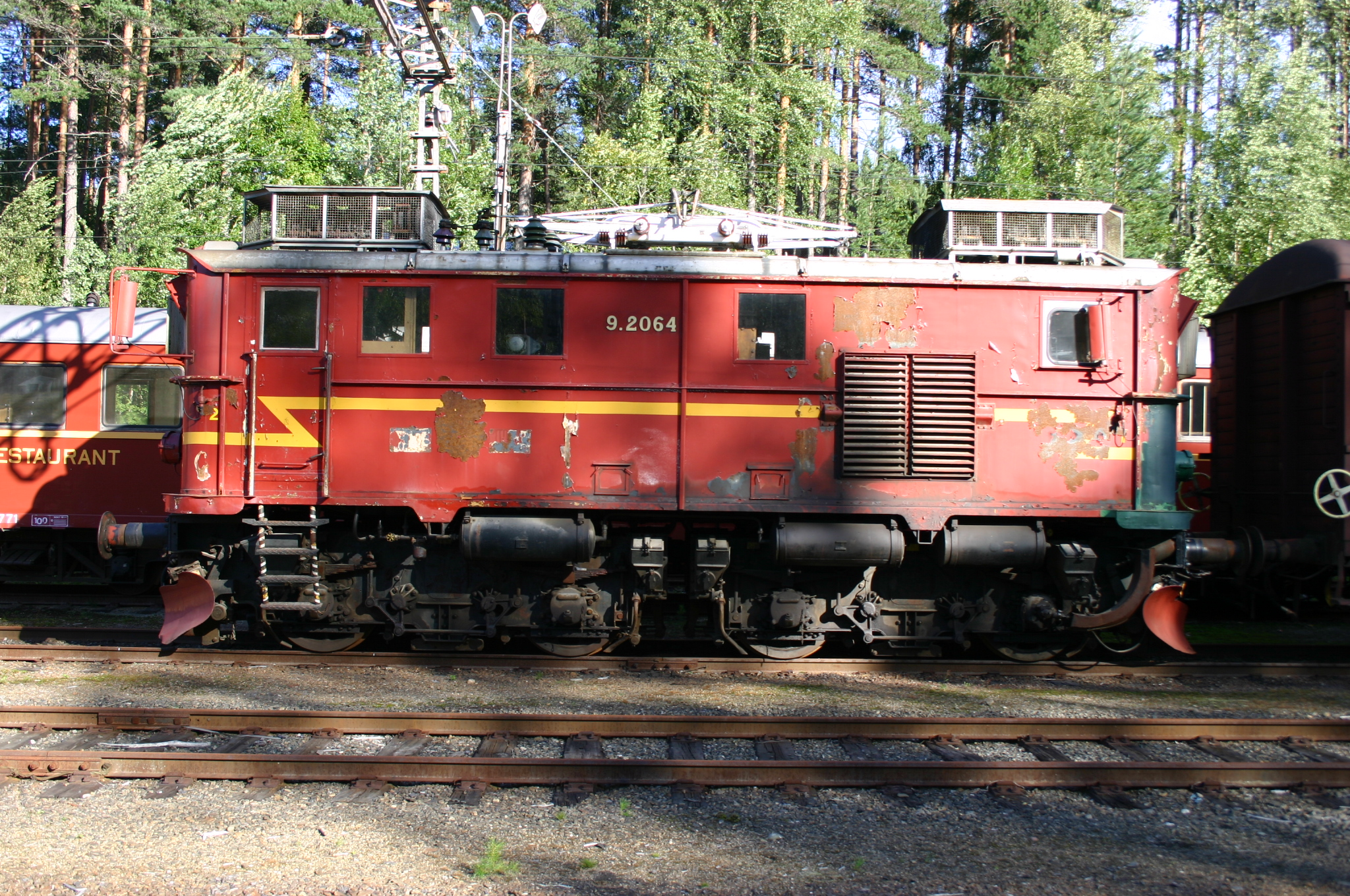
El 9.2064 is preserved at Tinnoset Station.

In the 1970s, NSB started to consider replacement of the class. In 1971 and 1973, El 11 and El 13 were test-run on the line, and it was concluded that El 11 would be suitable with minor adjustments. However, the 1960s replacement of steam locomotives had caused a shortage of electric locomotives. Not until 1980 did NSB start the upgrade process of two El 11s. From 1980s, only a single El 9 was stationed on the Flåm Line during winter, and the other two were used for local trains on the Bergen Line in Hallingdal. If the unit stationed in Flåm was out of order, it was replaced by a Class 64 unit. Lack of spare parts and limited reliability accelerated the need to replace the units in scheduled trains. The first unit was taken into use on the Flåm Line in 1983 and the second in 1984. Two El 9s were transferred to Ål Station and Voss Station where they hauled work trains. Unit 2062 was taken out of service in 1983. The other two remained in regular service until 1988. Unit 2063 has been painted green and is on display at Flåm Station, while 2064 has retained the red color scheme and is stored at Tinnoset Station, belonging to the Norwegian Railway Museum.

== Specifications ==
The locomotives each have four NEBB EDTM423 motors, giving a combined power output of 712 kilowatts (955 hp). The main transformer is capable of feeding each motor with 765 kilovolt-ampere (kVA), 115 kVA to heating and 40 kVA for axillary equipment. The power output is regulated with through 28 steps in the voltage regulator which is integrated with the main transformer. The locomotives have a maximum speed of 60 km/h (37 mph) and a tractive effort of 108 kilonewtons (24,000 lb_{f}). Because of the limited roof space, only one pantograph was installed.

The limit on axle load makes the locomotives small and compact. They weigh 48 tonnes (47 long tons; 53 short tons), and the total train weight is limited to 85 tonnes (84 long tons; 94 short tons). This also gives the trains a short length of 10.2 meters (33 ft). The trains had a Bo'Bo' wheel arrangement. In addition to air brakes for the whole train, the locomotives are equipped with rheostatic brakes which is sufficiently powerful to allow for the 5.5 percent gradient. When braking, three of the motors are connected to the air-cooled resistance on the roof, while the last motor is connected to deliver magnetization current to the other three motors. The braking is regulated with 22 steps. As a backup, the units are equipped with a carborundum track brake on each side of the bogies.
