= Hardanger Line =

Norwegian railway line

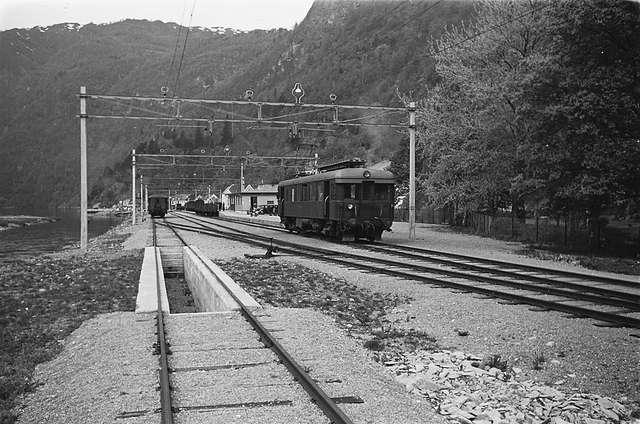
- NSB Class 64 train at Granvin

Overview
- Native name: Hardangerbanen
- Status: Abandoned
- Owner: Norwegian State Railways
- Termini: Voss Station; Granvin Station

Service
- Type: Railway
- System: Norwegian railway
- Operator: Norwegian State Railways

History
- Opened: 1935
- Closed: 1989

Technical
- Line length: 27.5 km (17.1 mi)
- Number of tracks: Single
- Character: Passenger and freight
- Track gauge: 1,435 mm (4 ft 8 1/2 in) standard gauge
- Electrification: 15 kV 16.7 Hz AC
- Highest elevation: 248.4 m (815 ft) amsl

The Hardanger Line (Norwegian: Hardangerbana or Hardangerbanen) was a 27.45-kilometre (17.06 mi) railway between Vossevangen and Granvin in Hordaland county, Norway. The line connected to the Bergen Line in Voss Municipality and ran to the Hardangerfjord and the district of Hardanger. Construction started in 1921, but the line did not open until 1 April 1935. Owned and operated by Norwegian State Railways (NSB), passenger transport was provided by three NSB Class 64 electric multiple units. They remained in use until 1985 when passenger transport was terminated. All transport ceased in 1988, and 21 kilometres (13 mi) of the line was demolished in 1991. The 3 kilometres (2 mi) from Voss to Palmafoss is still intact and is owned by the Norwegian National Rail Administration. The line featured six stations, fourteen halts and four tunnels and was one of Norway's steepest railways. It was NSB's first line to be electrified. The line was known as the Granvin Line (Granvinbanen) until February 1936. In 2016, Palmafoss established an emergency freight terminal and the tracks were re-established.

== Route ==
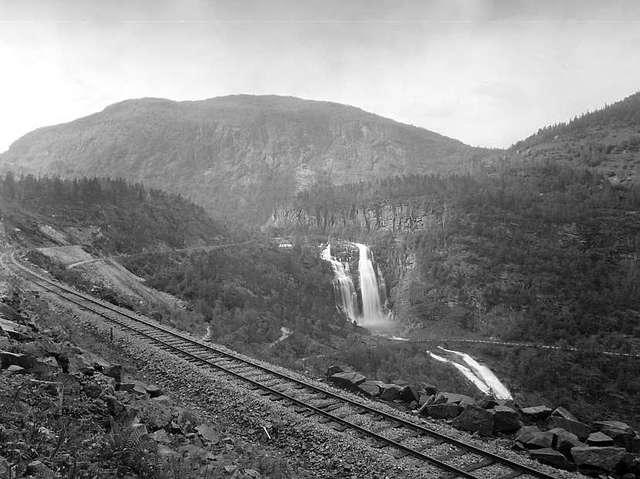
The Hardanger Line near Skjervet in 1933

The Hardanger Line ran 27.45 km (17.06 mi) from Voss to Granvin in Hardanger. From Voss to Skjervet, the line ran in relatively flat terrain, with easy construction. Along this section, the route followed what is now Norwegian National Road 13. At Skjervet, the two split; the gradient increased towards Nesheim and the topography became more difficult. On this section there were four tunnels named Skjervet Tunnel I to IV, the longest being 1,101 m (3,612 ft). The line was built on a shelf between the two longest tunnels. Later, the tunnel was extended from 630 m (2,070 ft) to also include that portion in the tunnel. The railway ran on the west side of the River Granvinvatnet from Skjervet, while the road ran on the east side.

The Hardanger Line was built with a minimum curve radius of 180 m (590 ft) and a maximum gradient of 4.5 per cent and was built with standard-gauge tracks weighing 25 kg/m (50 lb/yd), later increased to 30 kg/m (60 lb/yd). In 1980, the 3 kilometres (2 mi) section from Voss to Palmafoss had a permitted axle load of 18 tonnes (18 long tons; 20 short tons) and a maximum speed of 40 km/h (25 mph). From Palmafoss to Granvin, the permitted axle load was 12 tonnes (12 long tons; 13 short tons) and the maximum speed was 50 km/h (31 mph). The system had stations with buildings at Voss, Palmafoss, Mønshaug, Skjervet, Nesheim and Granvin. In addition, there were halts at Haugamo, Kinne, Bjørgum, Mala, Dalsleitet, Flatlandsmo, Såkvitno, Selland and Kolanes.

Granvin is a port on the Hardangerfjord and was the center for freight transport in Hardanger. Hardanger is dominated by a small number of large industrial companies, primarily smelters, which were responsible for more than 80 percent of the line's cargo volume. While Hardanger in the 1980s had a population of 40,000, Granvin had a population of 1,000 and was the smallest municipality in Hardanger. Granvin served as a ferry hub for services by Hardanger Sunnhordlandske Dampskipsselskap (HSD), and in 1980 there up to two daily services with the local ferry services in Hardanger, in addition to fast ferries to both Bergen and Stavanger. Buses operated to Granvin from Norheimsund and Kvanndal.

The line (but not the power system) is intact for 3 km (1.9 mi) from Voss to Palmafoss and is maintained by the Norwegian National Rail Administration. From there to Skjervet, the line has been asphalted and is used as a hiking and cycle path. The section from Skjervet to Nesheim is disused now, although it has been proposed as a road. The hiking and cycle path continues from Nesheim, although the right-of-way no longer exists on the last kilometre before Granvin. The station buildings at Nesheim and Granvin are still standing, but the ones at Palmafoss, Mønshaug and Skjervet have been demolished.

In 2016, Palmafoss established an emergency freight terminal for the Bergen line. If the Bergen Line is closed, freight can be transferred to trucks at Palmafoss. At the same time the tracks were renovated and re-established between Voss and Palmafoss.

== History ==
During construction of the Voss Line from Bergen to Voss, there was a proposal to extend the line from Voss to Granvin on the Hardangerfjord. The plans were again taken up to consideration with the construction of the Bergen Line, but also this time the plans were scrapped. Some people wanted the line to be a tramway and when it was passed by the Parliament of Norway on 12 July 1919; the plans incorporated some elements of a tramway, giving the line a lower standard than the main line. The railway was to be built in an electrified form and construction started in 1921. However, there was a lack of engineers, forcing a slow pace. On 5 November 1923, parliament passed the final plans for the railway and the pace of construction was accelerated.

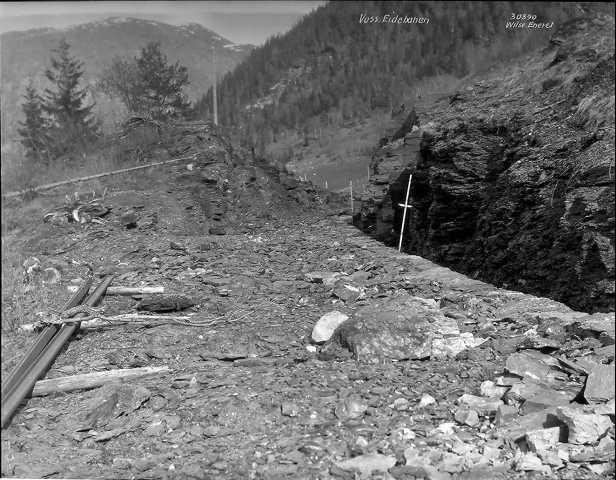
Construction during 1927

In 1927, Minister of Labour Worm Hirsch Darre-Jenssen of the Conservative Party stopped the work on the railway, however, stating that time had run out and that a road should be built there instead. By then, 5 million kr had been invested and parliament decided that construction should continue. However, Darre-Jenssen convinced Hordaland County Council to make a statement against the Hardanger Line, the Flåm Line and the Namsos Line, without this stopping construction. In 1931, parliament reconsidered the electrification of the line, and there was consensus for electrification. The Hardanger Line opened on 1 April 1935 and became NSB's first line to be electrified at the time of opening. In February 1936, the line changed name from the Granvin Line to the Hardanger Line.

Three Class 64 electric multiple units (EMU) were delivered from Strømmens Værksted in 1934. Only 16 metres (52 ft) long, they were the smallest EMUs ever operated by NSB. In addition, four passenger cars were delivered, with each multiple unit able to haul two passenger cars. Occasionally, Class 64 trains were used on the Flåm Line, after it was electrified in 1944, and El 9-hauled trains from the Flåm Line used on the Hardanger Line.

In the first year of operation, the line had 60,850 passengers, significantly over expectations. After the opening, there were five daily round trips. In 1939, the extension of the longest tunnel started, because the nearby section was subject to landslides. It was completed by the German occupational forces during World War II, but not taken into use by the railway until 1945 because of the German military's use of the tunnel as an ammunition depot. Because of the electric traction, the line was not affected by the lack of coal during World War II, and in 1945 it had 285,900 passengers. After the end of the war, the number of daily round trips increased to seven, but this was reduced to six in the 1950s. In 1955, a morning and evening coach service started between Granvin and Voss. It was further extended in 1968, when it started corresponding with services on the Bergen Line.

Initially, the freight transport was small. During the war, transport increased many-fold, particularly because of export of lumber. In 1966, a spur was built just south of Palmafoss to Voss Cementvarefabrikk. By the end of the 1960s, the line was transporting 30,000 tonnes (30,000 long tons; 33,000 short tons). During the late 1970s, the amount of transport fel dramatically, and reached 11,000 tonnes (11,000 long tons; 12,000 short tons) in 1980. Nearly half of this was import of lumber to three sawmills and manufacturing companies. In 1972, Linjegods established a daily scheduled truck service to Granvin. Although Linjegods used train to and from Voss, the service from Voss to Granvin was operated parallel to the railway. In 1975, Tollpost Globe also established a similar service between Voss and Granvin. During the late 1970s, the manufacturer Bjølvefossen experienced a large drop in the demand of ferroalloys, reducing production—and thus transport on the line—by 10,000 tonnes (9,800 long tons; 11,000 short tons). Another issue for the line was that it has a permitted axle load of only 12 tonnes (12 long tons; 13 short tons); this either prohibited optimal wagon weights on the main lines, or causing transshipment at Voss, both causing increased costs. In 1977, the average distance for cargo shipped from the Hardanger Line was 444 kilometres (276 mi) by rail.

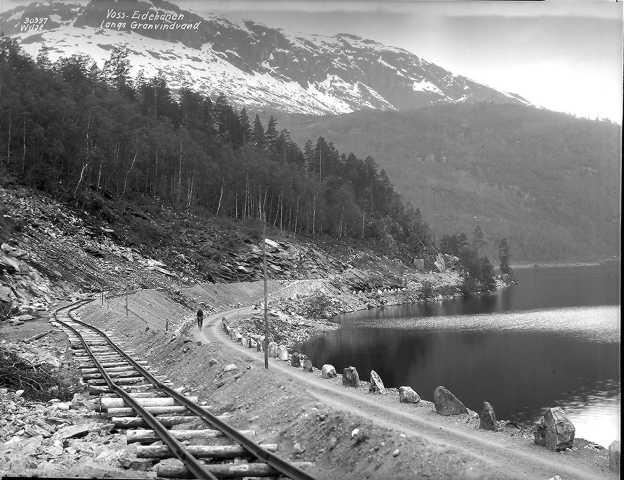
During construction along the lake Granvinvatnet in 1927

In 1980, the line had NOK 2.1 million in income, of which NOK 1.6 million was from freight (representing all revenue from freight that ran on the Hardanger Line). Operating expenses were NOK 4.8 million, and the deficit was covered by the national government. The line employed 21 people. In 1980, the estimated cost of upgrading the line to 18 tonnes (18 long tons; 20 short tons) axle load was NOK 9.6 million. Freight volume was then estimated to increase between 100 and 300 percent, and an upgrade was calculated to give a positive net present value, although it would not be sufficient to cover the full existing deficit. The plans included introduction of a refrigerated depot at Granvin. At the same time, it was estimated that the cost of retaining a 12-tonne (12-long-ton; 13-short-ton) axle load would require investments of NOK 6 million.

In 1979, the concession for passenger transport between Voss and Granvin was transferred from NSB's bus division to HSD and Bergen–Hardanger–Voss Billag. At the same time, the number of weekly services increased from 14 to 34. This was largely a result of the 1975 declaration by Hordaland County Council to support the closure of the line. In 1980, the railway had 60,000 passengers. A halt was opened at Mala in 1981, but then all passenger traffic was terminated on 2 June 1985. Class 64 had remained in use until the end, and there existed no political desire to invest in new rolling stock. Freight transport was retained, at first using El 9, and later shunting locomotives because of the lack of maintenance. From 1 March 1989, all transport on the line was terminated. NSB wanted to renovate the line and continue operations. Among the plans were to transport metal from the smelters in Hardanger via the Hardanger Line to Continental Europe. This would have required the axle load to be increased. Other plans were to extend some of the departures of the Bergen Commuter Rail from Voss to Granvin or operate commercially profitable tourist trains similar to the service provided on the Flåm Line.

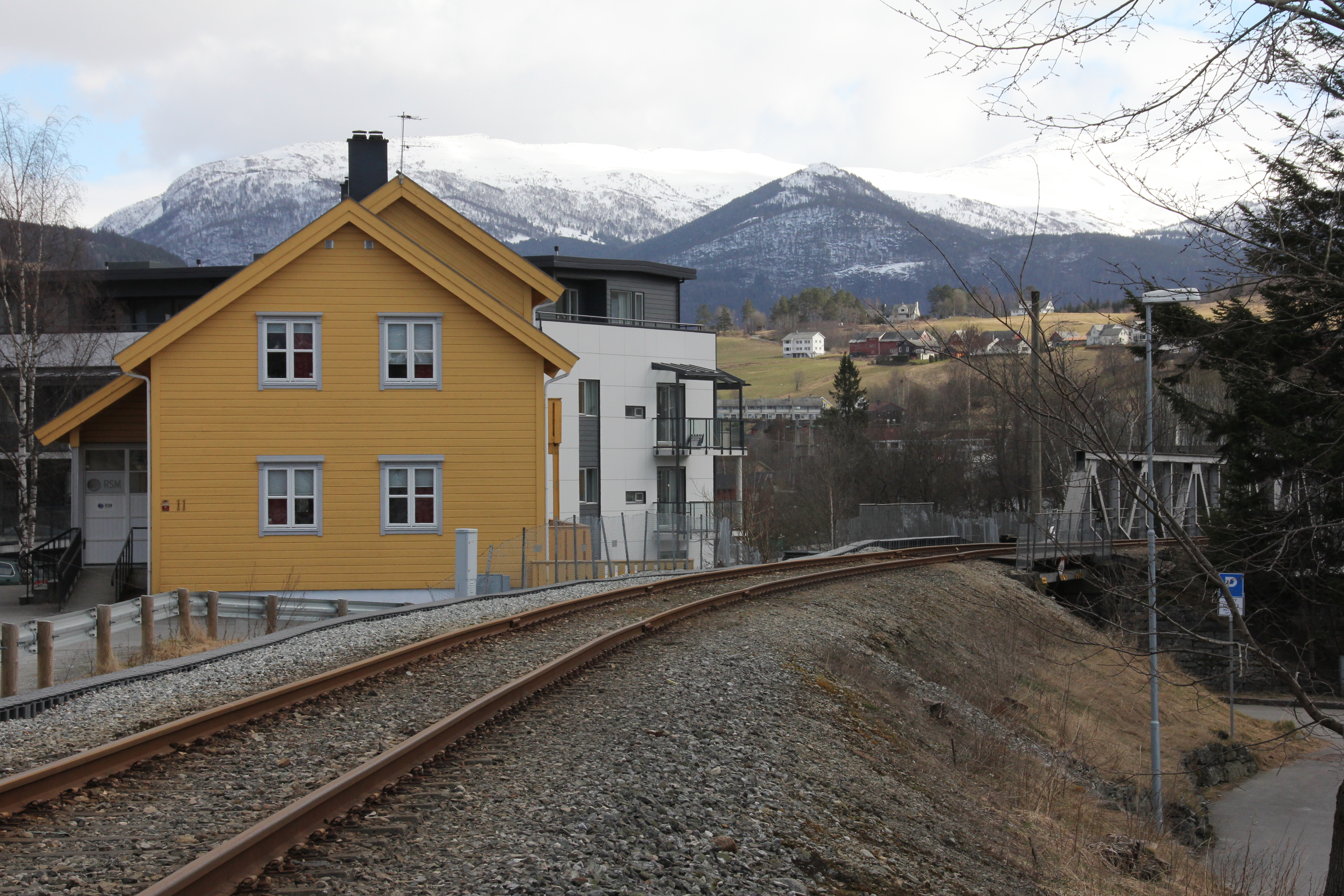
Remains of the Hardanger Line today.

The municipalities of Voss and Granvin wanted to use the right-of-way for a hiking and bicycle path, and NSB canceled their plans. Demolition started on 10 December 1991, although the section from Voss to Palmafoss was kept to serve a cement factory. Two of the Class 64 trains have been preserved by the Norwegian Railway Association and are based at the Old Voss Line in Bergen.

== Sources ==
- Aspenberg, Nils Carl (1994). Glemte spor: boken om sidebanenes tragiske liv (in Norwegian). Oslo: Baneforlaget. ISBN 82-91448-00-0.
- Aspenberg, Nils Carl (2001). Elektrolok i Norge (in Norwegian). Oslo: Baneforlaget. ISBN 82-91448-42-6.
- Bjerke, Thor (1994). Banedata '94 (in Norwegian). Oslo: Norsk Jernbaneklubb. ISBN 82-90286-15-5.
- Hordaland County Municipality (October 1981). Hardangerbana (in Norwegian). Bergen.
