= Flekkefjord Dampskipsselskap =

Norwegian shipping company

Flekkefjord Dampskipsselskap AS is a Norwegian shipping company that operates the Kvellandstrand–Launes Ferry and the Abelnes–Andabeløy Ferry outside Flekkefjord in Agder county, Norway. The company is a subsidiary of Norled (previously Tide Sjø).
