= HNLMS O 2 =

1911 O 2-class submarine

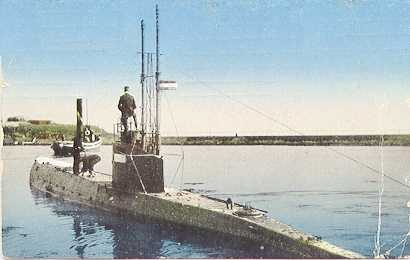
- O 2

History
- Name: O 2
- Builder: De Schelde, Flushing
- Laid down: 11 October 1909
- Launched: 30 January 1911
- Commissioned: 1 December 1911
- Decommissioned: 1930
- Fate: Decommissioned 1930

General characteristics
- Class & type: O 2-class submarine
- Displacement: 134 tons - 149 tons
- Length: 32.13 m (105 ft 5 in)
- Beam: 3.3 m (10 ft 10 in)
- Draught: 2.73 m (8 ft 11 in)
- Propulsion: 1 × 280 bhp (209 kW) diesel engine; 1 × 145 bhp (108 kW) electric motor
- Speed: 11 kn (20 km/h; 13 mph) surfaced; 8 kn (15 km/h; 9.2 mph) submerged
- Range: 500 nmi (930 km; 580 mi) at 10 kn (19 km/h; 12 mph) on the surface; 35 nmi (65 km; 40 mi) at 7 kn (13 km/h; 8.1 mph) submerged
- Complement: 10
- Armament: 2 × 18 inch bow torpedo tubes

O 2 was an O 2 class patrol submarines of the Royal Netherlands Navy. The ship was built by De Schelde shipyard in Flushing.

== Service history ==
The submarine was ordered on 1 June 1909 and 11 October that year the O 2 was laid down in Flushing at the shipyard of De Schelde. The launch took place on 30 January 1911. In the autumn of that year, trials were held and a depth of 40 meters was reached with no crew on board. On 1 December of that year the O 2 was commissioned in the Dutch navy.

In the autumn of 1913 the O 2 held a torpedo exercise with the HNLMS Jacob van Heemskerck.

During World War I the ship was based in Flushing.

When leaving the harbor of IJmuiden on 26 February 1919 the O 2 collided with the Dirk Sch 219, which had entered the harbor. After the collision both vessels sank. Submarine personnel escaped the ship through the tower hatch. The ships were later salvaged and the O 2 was repaired.

In 1930 the O 2 was decommissioned. In the early 1930s the ship served as a training vessel.
