= MS Sleipner =

Norwegian high-speed catamaran ferry

Coordinates: 59°32′36″N 5°13′29″E

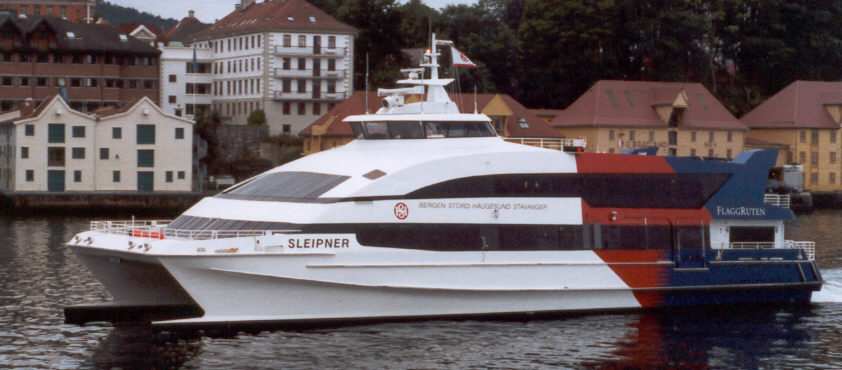
- M/S Sleipner entering Vågen, Bergen

History

Norway
- Name: MS Sleipner
- Namesake: Sleipnir
- Owner: Hardanger Sunnhordlandske Dampskipsselskap
- Awarded: 27 March 1998
- Builder: Austal Ships Pty., Henderson, Australia
- Yard number: 83
- Laid down: 28 June 1998
- Launched: 24 February 1999
- Acquired: 18 August 1999
- In service: 25 August 1999
- Identification: IMO number: 9193032
- Fate: Sank, 26 November 1999

General characteristics
- Tonnage: 375 GT
- Length: 42.16 m (138 ft 4 in) o/a; 40.9 m (134 ft 2 in) w/l
- Beam: 12.5 m (41 ft 0 in)
- Draught: 1.76 m (5 ft 9 in)
- Depth: 9.2 m (30 ft 2 in)
- Propulsion: 2 × 2,320 kW (3,110 hp) MTU 16V-4000-M70 diesel engines
- Speed: 35 knots (65 km/h; 40 mph)
- Capacity: 358 passengers
- Crew: 9

MS Sleipner was a Norwegian high-speed catamaran ferry built in 1999 for the HSD Sjø company by Austal Ships of Australia. Constructed largely of aluminium, she was 42 metres (138 ft) long, 12.5 metres (41 ft) wide, and certified for 358 passengers.

On 26 November 1999, only three months after being commissioned, during bad weather, Sleipner collided with a rock in the notorious part of the North Sea called "Sletta", just north of the town of Haugesund. The ship sank and 16 of the people on board died.

== Ship details ==
The design of the high-speed catamaran was developed by the Norwegian ferry company Hardanger Sunnhordlandske Dampskipsselskap (HSD) in partnership with Paradis Nautica AS of Bergen, based on a desire for increased passenger comfort, speed, and lower operating costs. In September 1997, HSD invited tenders for construction, and on 27 March 1998 a contract was signed between HSD and boatbuilders Austal Ships Pty. of Henderson, Western Australia for the construction of two vessels, Sleipner and Draupner. The Sleipner was laid down on 28 June 1998, and launched on 24 February 1999. Transported to Norway, she was officially handed over on 18 August, and entered service on 25 August 1999.

== Disaster ==
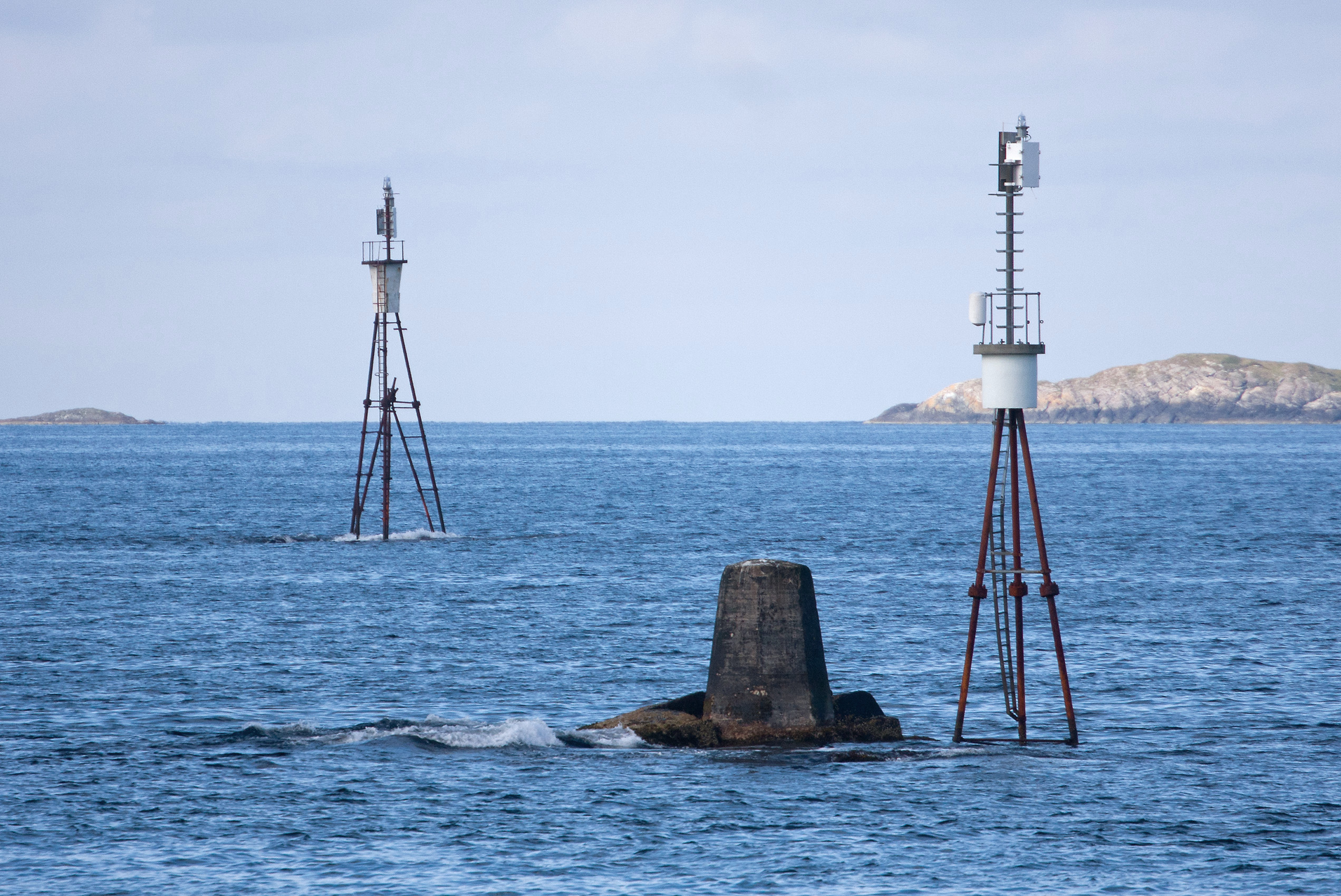
The rocks called Store Blokso that Sleipner hit before it sank

On Friday, 26 November 1999 Sleipner left Haugesund at 18.50 on course for Bergen. Across the open sea at Sletta, the boat experienced strong winds from the south-west. At 19.08 the boat crashed into the rock called Store Bloksen. Immediately after the crash, Sleipner notified the authorities of the accident via Rogaland Radio (RR) which was relayed to the Hovedredningssentralen (Joint Rescue Coordination Centre of Southern Norway), stating that Sleipner had hit the rocks near the Ryvarden Lighthouse.

Recognizing the possible consequences of the accident, the JRCC declared a Mayday situation, something the Sleipner crew had not done. All ships within a 30–45-minute radius of the accident were asked to assist in the rescue operation, and about half an hour after Sleipner sank. Approximately 10–12 boats were providing assistance.

Of the 85 people on board, 69 were saved. Afterwards the bodies of the remaining 16 people were recovered and identified. This made it the most severe accident with passenger ferries in the recent history of Norway.

=== Investigation and aftermath ===
The investigation following the disaster revealed that the accident and its magnitude was caused by a number of factors:

- The initial cause of the accident was a navigational error as the boat was approximately 400 meters off course. The boat had started service only a few months before, and the crew was not yet fully acquainted with its equipment, most notably its radar system. It was established that the crew had focused too much on the radar and not on visual inspection.
- At the time of the accident, the waves were higher than the boat was certified for. The ferry company had not completed a hard-weather test for Sleipner, and the Norwegian Maritime Authority therefore gave the boat a temporary permit with a maximum significant wave height of one meter. The authorities and the ferry company, however, failed to ensure that the ferry only sailed within this limit. On the evening of the accident, the wave height at the accident site was 2.3 meters.
- Austal Ships had deviated from the original blueprints. Instead of installing one communication device in each of the two hulls, both the main and back-up system were installed on one side. As it was this side that hit the rock, most of the electrical circuits went off-line shortly after the accident.
- Only one of the life rafts was deployed, and this one floated away before passengers could board. Again the inexperience of the crew with the new boat was the cause of this, having only practised emergency procedures during fair weather. The investigating commission also criticized the safety and life raft system for being flawed and too complicated. The checklist for deploying the life rafts included a total of 24 steps, and all passengers were supposed to be evacuated through the entry hall, which the commission found to be too small in an emergency situation.
- The life vests had serious flaws. They were donned by putting the head through an opening and then tightening the sides. However, upon entering the water, the life vests slipped off over the passengers' head. The life vests had been approved by British authorities and accepted in Norway, although it was only after the accident discovered that they failed to comply with regulations. As a consequence of the investigation, all life vests on Norwegian passenger ferries were changed to a model that includes an extra strap that needs to be passed between the passengers' legs.

The captain of the ship, Sverre Johan Hagland, was sentenced to 6 months' imprisonment.
