= NSB Class 64 =

Norwegian State Railways' class of electric multiple units

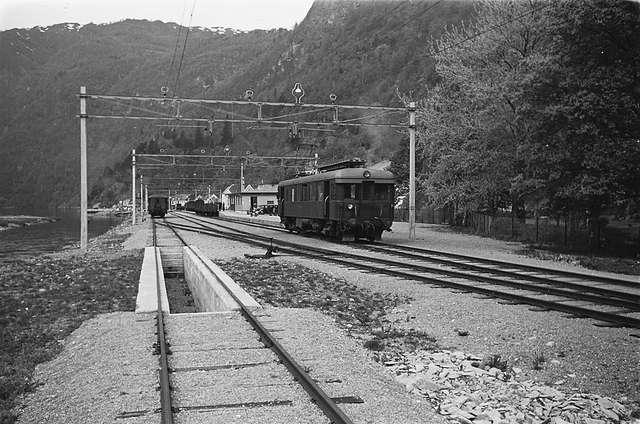
- Class 64 at Granvin Station in 1939
- In service: 1934–1985
- Manufacturer: NEBB and Strømmen
- Constructed: 1934
- Number built: 3
- Capacity: 38
- Operators: Norwegian State Railways

Specifications
- Car length: 16,300 mm (53 ft 6 in)
- Maximum speed: 50 km/h (31 mph)
- Traction system: 4 × NEBB EDTM 384
- Power output: 464 kW (622 hp)
- Electric system(s): 15 kV 16.7 Hz AC Catenary
- Current collector(s): Pantograph
- Track gauge: 1,435 mm (4 ft 8 1/2 in)

NSB Class 64 (Norwegian: NSB type 64) is a class of three electric multiple units built by Strømmens Værksted for the Norwegian State Railways. Delivered in 1935, they were built for the opening of the Hardanger Line and served there until 1985, when the line closed and the trains were retired. They also periodically served on the Flåm Line. The delivery consisted of three motor cars and four carriages, with each train consisting of up to three units. The motor cars were 16.3 meters (53 ft) long, had a power output of 464 kilowatts (622 hp) and were capable of 50 km/h (31 mph). The motor units were given road numbers 505 through 507. Two of the units have been preserved by the Norwegian Railway Club and are at Garnes Station.

== History ==
The Hardanger Line opened in 1935 as a steep and curvy branch of the Bergen Line to connect Bergen to the Hardangerfjord. The line was 27.45 kilometers (17.06 mi) long, had a maximum gradient of 4.5 percent, a minimum curve radius of 180 meters (591 ft), a maximum speed of 40 km/h (25 mph), a maximum permitted axle load of 12 tonnes (12 long tons; 13 short tons), standard gauge and a 15 kV 16.7 Hz AC electrification system. In 1931, NSB had taken delivery of its first electric multiple unit, the Class 62, for use on commuter trains on the Drammen Line. For the Hardanger Line, NSB ordered similar units, but these were modified to have a higher power output. Three motor cars and four carriages were delivered in 1934. The mechanical components and assembly were done by Strømmens Værksted, while the electrical equipment was made by Norsk Elektrisk & Brown Boveri (NEBB). The class was similar to the future Class 65, and was regarded as a prototype. Class 64 were the shortest multiple units ever used by NSB.

From 21 November 1944, when the Flåm Line received electric traction, Class 64 trains were also used there. The Flåm Line is even steeper and more curved than the Hardanger Line, so the trains received track brakes. In 1947, El 9 locomotives were delivered for the Flåm Line. Class 64 trains continued to be used periodically on the Flåm Line when there was insufficient availability of El 9s, as well as in periods with very little or very much traffic.

Unit 64.07 was retired on 20 December 1982 after rust damage had been found on it. By 1984, the carriages were in such bad shape that they needed to be replaced. Trailers from Class 65 and Class 67 were taken into use, and for a short period a Class 91 trailer. On 28 August 1985, passenger traffic on the line was terminated and the two remaining trains were retired. Reasons for the termination included a lack of sufficient political support for financing new trains, and also that Class 64 was no longer suitable for use. The last two trains have been preserved by the Norwegian Railway Club and are stored at Garnes Station, part of the Old Voss Line.

== Specifications ==
The units each had four NEBB EDTM384 motors, giving a combined power output of 464 kilowatts (622 hp). They had an overall length of 16.3 meters (53 ft), weighed 35.5 tonnes (34.9 long tons; 39.1 short tons) and had a Bo-Bo wheel arrangement. The motor cars had a capacity for 38 passengers and a maximum speed of 50 km/h (31 mph). Because of the steep gradients, the units had a low weight combined with high power output, and had both track brakes and dynamic braking. They were originally given road numbers 18505 though 18507, but this was later changed to 64.05 through 64.07.
