= MF Tysnes =

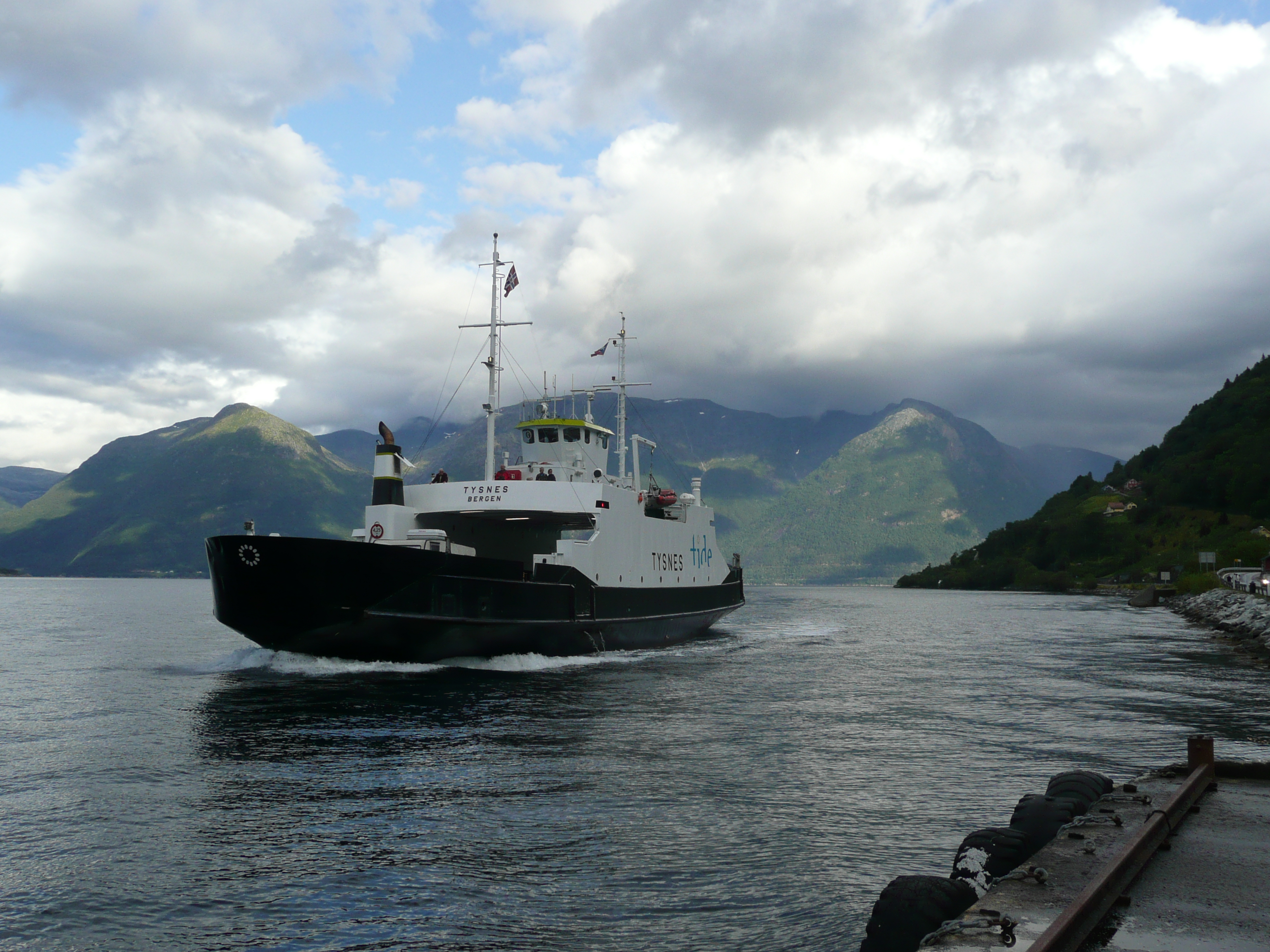
- Tysnes at Utne in 2009

History

Norway
- Name: Tysnes
- Namesake: Tysnes Municipality
- Owner: Hardanger Sunnhordlandske Dampskipsselskap (1970-2006); Tide (2006-2012); Norled (2012-present)
- Port of registry: Bergen
- Builder: Haugesund Slip AS, Haugesund
- Launched: 1970
- Identification: IMO number: 7023104; Call sign: LA4HLGE; MMSI number: 257018700
- Status: in active service, as of 2012

General characteristics
- Type: Car/passenger ferry
- Tonnage: 534 GT
- Length: 60 m (196 ft 10 in) o/a
- Beam: 11 m (36 ft 1 in)
- Draught: 3.5 m (11 ft 6 in)
- Speed: 11.5 knots (21.3 km/h; 13.2 mph)
- Capacity: 162 passengers; 25 vehicles

MF Tysnes is a Norwegian car and passenger ferry in operation in Hardangerfjord since 1970.

== Ship history ==
The vessel was built by Haugesund Slip AS in Haugesund in 1970 for the Hardanger Sunnhordlandske Dampskipsselskap ("Hardanger-Sunnhordland Steamship Company"). Since then it has operated almost entirely between the villages of Kinsarvik, Utne and Kvanndal. In 2006 HSD merged with Gaia Trafikk forming a new company called Tide. The company ferry section changed its name to Norled in 2012.

== See also ==
- Transport in Norway
