= MF Stord =

Ship built in 1970

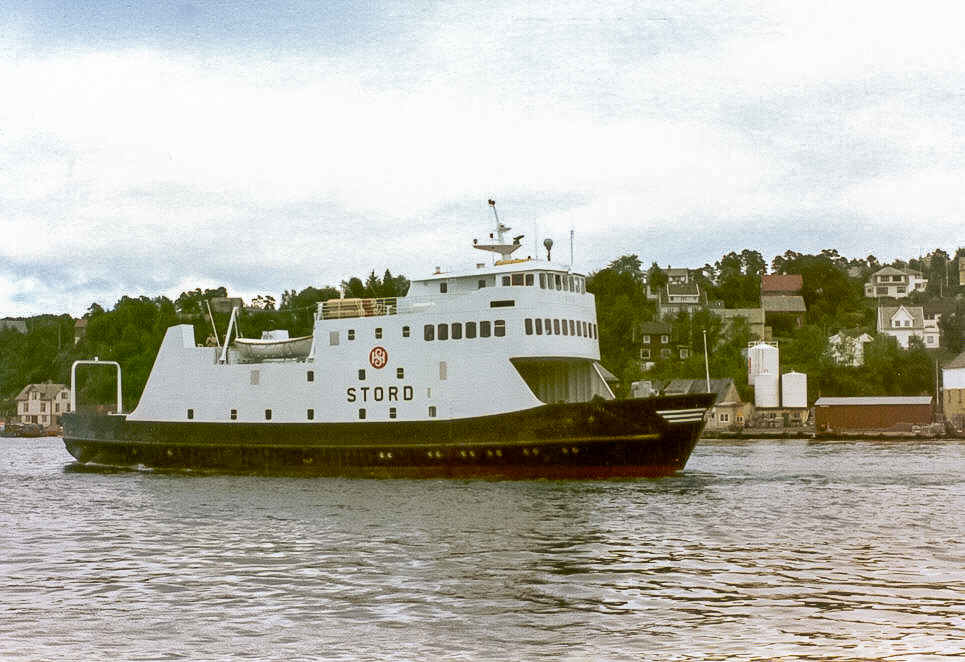
- Stord (1970)

History

Norway
- Name: Stord (1970-1986); Fusa I (1986-1987); Fusa (1987-present)
- Namesake: Stord; Fusa
- Owner: Hardanger Sunnhordlandske Dampskipsselskap (1970-2006); Tide (2006-2012); Norled (2012-present)
- Port of registry: Bergen
- Builder: Hatlø Verksted, Ulsteinvik
- Yard number: 110
- Launched: 1970
- Identification: IMO number: 7023099; Call sign: LNHK
- Status: in active service, as of 2012

General characteristics
- Type: Car/passenger ferry
- Tonnage: 675 GT; 243 NT
- Length: 44.37 m (145 ft 7 in) o/a; 40.5 m (132 ft 10 in) p/p
- Beam: 10.61 m (34 ft 10 in)
- Draught: 3.22 m (10 ft 7 in)
- Depth: 4.2 m (13 ft 9 in)
- Propulsion: 1 × 900 hp (671 kW) Wickmann 6 ACAT diesel engines; 2 × Volvo Penta MD 100 BK engines; 1 × Bow thruster
- Speed: 12.5 knots (23.2 km/h; 14.4 mph)
- Capacity: 237 passengers; 23 vehicles

MS Stord is a Norwegian car/passenger ferry that has operated on various routes between the numerous islands of Vestland county since 1970.

== Ship history ==
The vessel was built at the Hatlø Verksted yard in Ulsteinvik in 1970 for the Hardanger Sunnhordlandske Dampskipsselskap ("Hardanger-Sunnhordland Steamship Company"). After operating as Stord from 1970, it was renamed Fusa I in 1986, and to Fusa in 1987. In 2006 HSD merged with Gaia Trafikk forming a new company called Tide. The company ferry section changed its name to Norled in 2012.

== See also ==
- Transport in Norway
