= Granvin Station =

Former railway station in Voss, Norway

Granvin
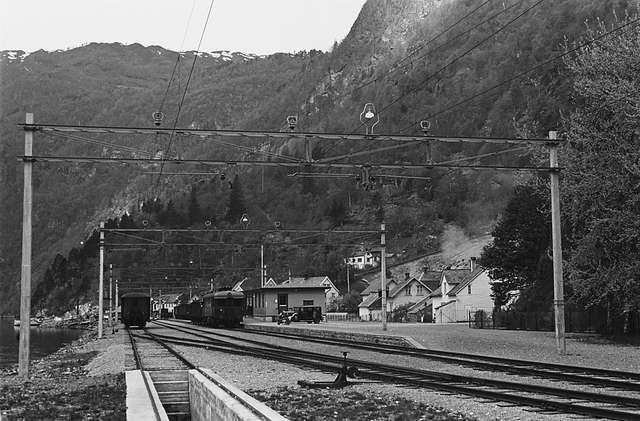

General information
- Location: Granvin, Granvin Municipality; Norway
- Coordinates: 60.5208°N 6.7174°E
- Elevation: 2.0 m (6 ft 7 in)
- Owner: Norwegian State Railways
- Line: Hardanger Line
- Distance: 412.77 km (256.48 mi)

History
- Opened: 1 April 1935
- Closed: 1989
Location

Granvin Station (Norwegian: Granvin stasjon) is a former railway station on the Hardanger Line, located at Granvin in the old Granvin Municipality (now part of Voss Municipality, Norway. It opened in 1935 when the Hardanger Line was introduced and was staffed until 1 June 1958. The station was closed when the Hardanger Railway closed in 1989.

Preceding station		Following station
Terminus	Hardanger Line	Voss; Kollanes
