= HNLMS O 4 =

Dutch Submarine

History
- Name: O 4
- Ordered: 18 December 1911
- Builder: De Schelde
- Laid down: 15 June 1912
- Launched: 5 August 1913
- Commissioned: 17 June 1914
- Decommissioned: 1935
- In service: 1914–1935

General characteristics
- Class & type: O 2-class submarine
- Type: Submarine
- Displacement: 134 tons - 149 tons
- Length: 32.13 m (105 ft 5 in)
- Beam: 3.3 m (10 ft 10 in)
- Draught: 2.73 m (8 ft 11 in)
- Propulsion: 1 × 280 bhp (209 kW) diesel engine; 1 × 145 bhp (108 kW) electric motor
- Speed: 11 kn (20 km/h; 13 mph) surfaced; 8 kn (15 km/h; 9.2 mph) submerged
- Range: 500 nmi (930 km; 580 mi) at 10 kn (19 km/h; 12 mph) on the surface; 35 nmi (65 km; 40 mi) at 7 kn (13 km/h; 8.1 mph) submerged
- Complement: 10
- Armament: 2 × 18 inch bow torpedo tubes

O 4 was an O 2 class patrol submarine of the Royal Netherlands Navy. The ship was built by De Schelde shipyard in Flushing, Netherlands.

== Service history ==
The submarine was ordered on 18 December 1911. On 15 June 1912 the O 4 was laid down in Flushing at the shipyard of De Schelde. The launch took place on 5 August 1913.

A passive sonar and two retractable periscopes were installed on the ship making it the first submarine in the Dutch navy having this equipment.

On 17 June 1914 the ship was commissioned in the navy. During World War I the ship was based in Flushing. Queen Wilhelmina visited the ship on 22 December 1914.

In 1935 the O 4 was decommissioned.
