= MV Granvin =

1931 Norwegian ship

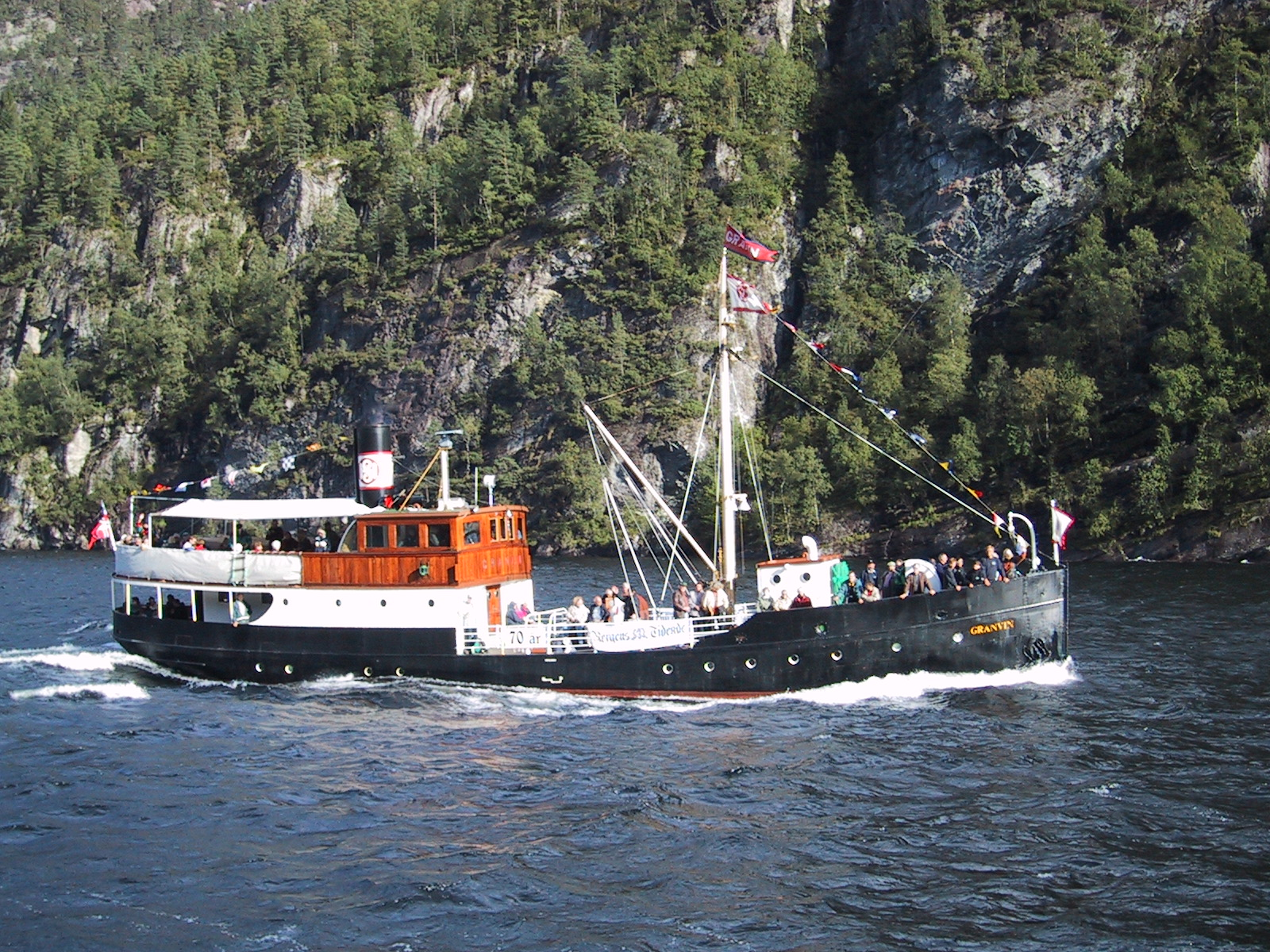

The Norwegian vintage ship MV Granvin was built in 1931 at Mjellem & Karlsen Verft, in Bergen, Norway for Hardanger Sunnhordlandske Dampskipsselskap for local trade with freight, passengers and cars.

The vessel sailed in regular traffic in Hardanger between 1931 and 1987. Granvin is a typical representative of the local passenger vessel built between the wars for traffic between Bergen and hinterland.

In 1988, the vessel was acquired by Veteranskipslaget Fjordabåten with the a view to preservation. In 1988/89, the vessel was restored to her original appearance with funnel and large saloon below deck forward.

Bergen is the base port.

== Specifications ==
- Passengers: 80 (on day trips)
- Speed: 10 knots
- Length: 89.9 feet
- Engine: 3 cyl. 2-stroke Wichmann 300 BHP
