= HNLMS O 3 =

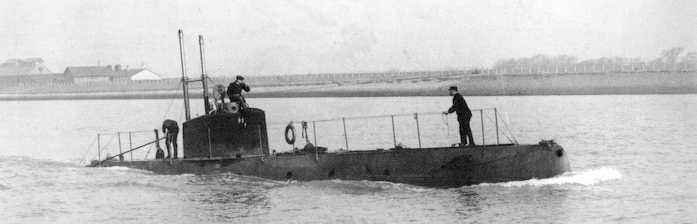
- O 3

History
- Name: O 3
- Builder: De Schelde
- Laid down: 31 December 1910
- Launched: 30 July 1912
- Commissioned: 11 February 1913
- Decommissioned: 1932
- Fate: Decommissioned 1932

General characteristics
- Class & type: O 2-class submarine
- Displacement: 134 tons; 149 tons
- Length: 32.13 m (105 ft 5 in)
- Beam: 3.3 m (10 ft 10 in)
- Draught: 2.73 m (8 ft 11 in)
- Propulsion: 1 × 280 bhp (209 kW) diesel engine; 1 × 145 bhp (108 kW) electric motor
- Speed: 11 kn (20 km/h; 13 mph) surfaced; 8 kn (15 km/h; 9.2 mph) submerged
- Range: 500 nmi (930 km; 580 mi) at 10 kn (19 km/h; 12 mph) on the surface; 35 nmi (65 km; 40 mi) at 7 kn (13 km/h; 8.1 mph) submerged
- Complement: 10
- Armament: 2 × 18 inch bow torpedo tubes

O 3 was a O 2 class patrol submarines of the Royal Netherlands Navy. The ship was built by De Schelde shipyard in Flushing.

== Service history ==
The submarine was ordered on 18 March 1910 and 31 December that year the O 3 was laid down in Flushing at the shipyard of De Schelde. The launch took place on 30 July 1912; later in the autumn that year trials were held.

Commissioning in the navy is delayed by a battery explosion during the trials on 1 November 1912. On 11 February 1913, the ship was finally commissioned. During World War I the ship was based in Flushing.

The Dutch queen Wilhelmina of the Netherlands makes a visit to the ship in Den Helder on 13 September 1914. The visit includes a dive off the coast of Den Helder.

In 1932 the O 3 was decommissioned.
