= HNLMS O 5 =

O 2 class patrol submarines

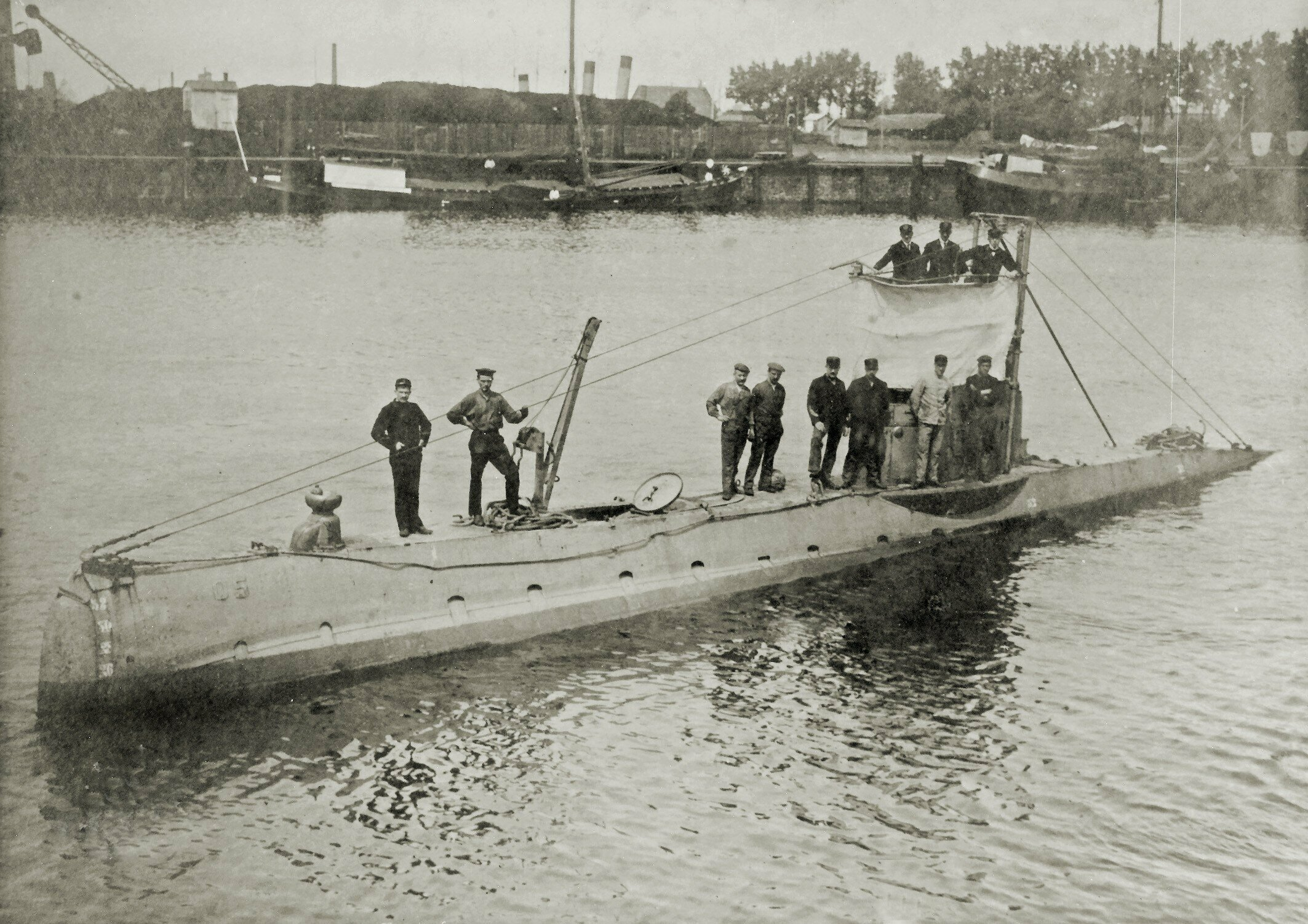
- O 5

History
- Name: O 5
- Builder: De Schelde
- Laid down: 15 June 1912
- Launched: 2 October 1913
- Commissioned: 20 or 21 August 1914
- Decommissioned: 1935
- Fate: Decommissioned 1935

General characteristics
- Class & type: O 2-class submarine
- Displacement: 134 tons; 149 tons
- Length: 32.13 m (105 ft 5 in)
- Beam: 3.3 m (10 ft 10 in)
- Draught: 2.73 m (8 ft 11 in)
- Propulsion: 1 × 280 bhp (209 kW) diesel engine; 1 × 145 bhp (108 kW) electric motor
- Speed: 11 kn (20 km/h; 13 mph) surfaced; 8 kn (15 km/h; 9.2 mph) submerged
- Range: 500 nmi (930 km; 580 mi) at 10 kn (19 km/h; 12 mph) on the surface; 35 nmi (65 km; 40 mi) at 7 kn (13 km/h; 8.1 mph) submerged
- Complement: 10
- Armament: 2 × 18 inch bow torpedo tubes

O 5 was a O 2 class patrol submarines of the Royal Netherlands Navy. The ship was built by De Schelde shipyard in Flushing.

== Service history ==
The submarine was ordered on 18 December 1911 and 15 June 1912 the O 5 was laid down in Flushing at the shipyard of De Schelde . The launch took place on 2 October 1913.

On 20 or 21 August 1914 the ship is commissioned in the navy and stationed in Den Helder. 31 Jan 1914, the ship sinks after the simultaneous opening of an inner and outer torpedo tube doors. O 5 was raised in February 1914 and recommissioned.

During World War I the ship was based in Den Helder. In 1915 the ship sinks again after the simultaneous opening of an inner and outer torpedo tube door. O 5 is raised again and recommissioned.

In 1916 on 9 February one man dies and six others are wounded after a torpedo explosion while moored in Flushing.

In 1935 the O 5 was decommissioned.
