= HNoMS Stord =

At least two ships of the Royal Norwegian Navy have been named HNoMS Stord, after the island of Stord:

- HNoMS Stord (G26), an S-class destroyer acquired from the Royal Navy in 1943 and broken up in 1959.
- HNoMS Stord (S308), a Kobben-class submarine launched in 1966 and transferred to Poland in 2002.
