= SS Stord I =

Norwegian passenger steam ship

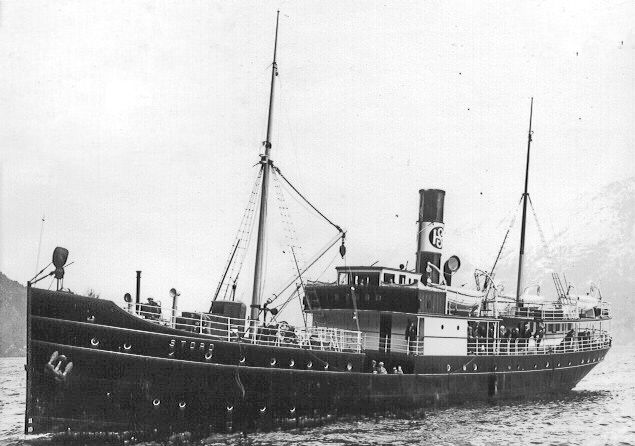
- SS Stord in Ulvik, Norway c.1913–1931

History
- Name: Stord (1913–1969); O T. Moe (1969–1984); Stord I (1984–)
- Owner: Hardanger Sunnhordlandske Dampskipsselskap (1913–1969); Oslo Krets av det Blå Kors (1969–1980); Norsk Veteranskibsklub (1980–)
- Builder: Laxevaag Maskin- og Jernskipsbyggeri
- Launched: 1913
- Identification: IMO number: 5341564; MMSI number: 257786980; Callsign: LEYT

General characteristics
- Type: Passenger steamer
- Tonnage: 376 GRT (1913–1931); 465 GRT (1931–c.1948); 469 GRT (c.1948–)
- Installed power: 2 × Paxman-Ricardo diesel engines (c.1948–1980); Steam (1980–)

The Norwegian vintage steamship SS Stord I was built as Stord in 1913 and delivered from Laxevaag Maskin- og Jernskipsbyggeri in Bergen, Norway to Hardanger Sunnhordlandske Dampskipsselskap (HSD).

She was 376 gross tons.

The vessel sailed in regular traffic from 1913 to 1969. Stord I is a typical representative of the local passenger steamers built for operating between Stavanger-Sunnhordland-Hardanger and Bergen.

In 1931, Stord I was rebuilt and modernised. 465 gross tons.

From 1947 to 1949 she was again rebuilt at Bergens Mekaniske Verksteder, Solheimsviken, Bergen as a motorship with the installation of two, 12-cylinder Paxman-Ricardo diesels. 469 gross tons.

On 2 October 1962 she collided with Fred Olsen's Bravo near Knarrevik.

In 1969 she was sold to Oslo Krets av det Blå Kors and renamed MV O T. Moe. She was berthed in Oslo as a floating welfare centre for alcoholics.

In 1980 she was sold to Norsk Veteranskibsklub and transferred to Veteranskipslaget Fjordabåten, Bergen with a view to preservation. She was restored to 1931-condition, including the installation of engines from a 1942 steam-driven British vessel. Technical trials were run. Gutted by fire en route from Sunnhordland to Bergen on 20 May 1987.

The ship is under restoration again by Veteranskipslaget Fjordabåten. Technical trials were run in August 2005.

SS Stord I
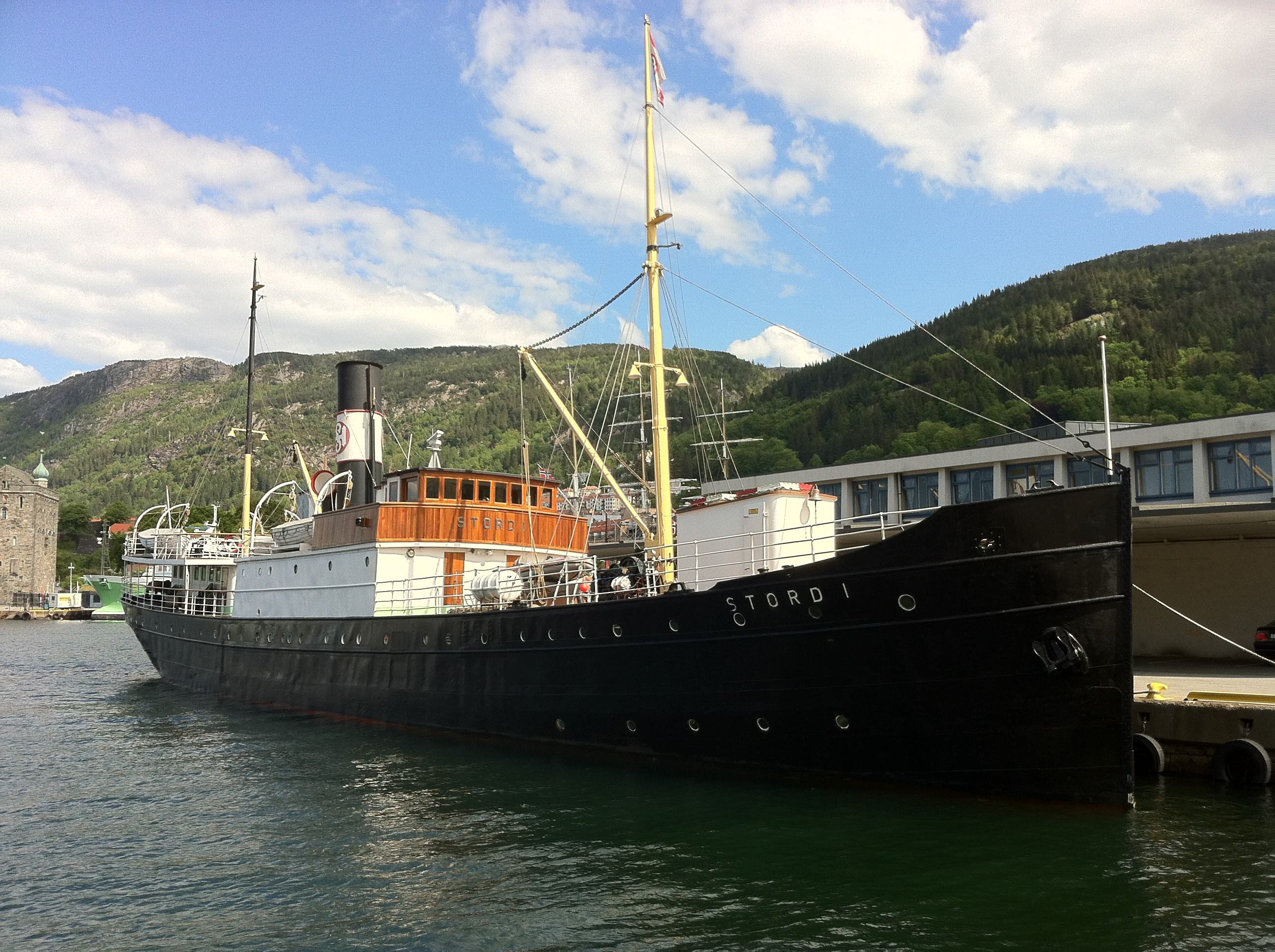
Stord I moored in Bergen harbour in June 2012

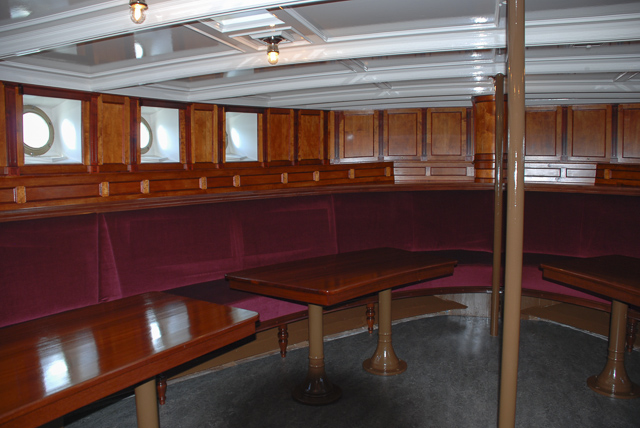
1st class passenger seating area in Stord I

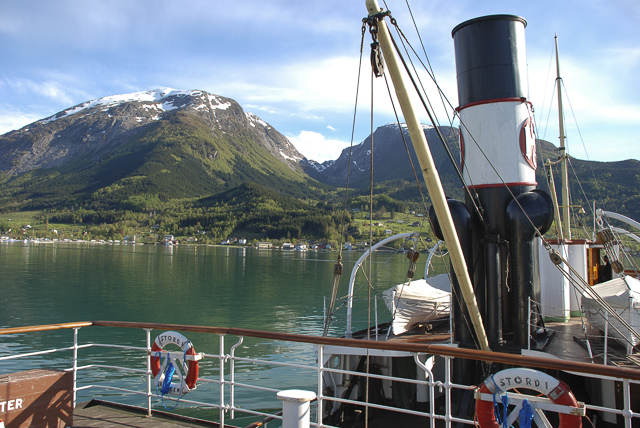
Stord I in Kvinherad, Norway

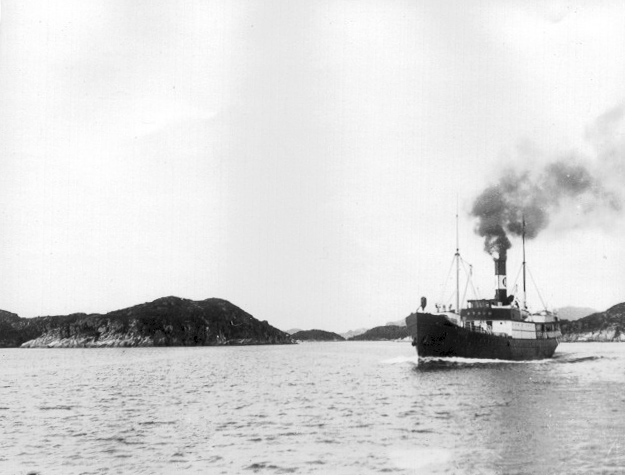
Stord c.1913–1931
