= O 2-class submarine =

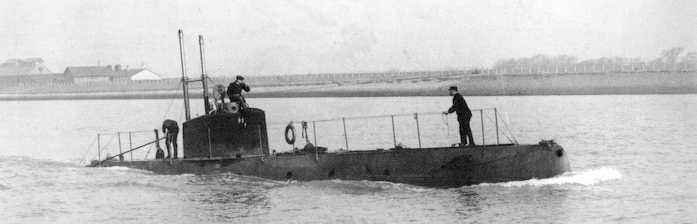
- O 3

Class overview
- Name: O 2
- Builders: Koninklijke Maatschappij De Schelde, Flushing
- Operators: Royal Netherlands Navy
- Preceded by: O 1
- Succeeded by: O 6
- Built: 1909–1914
- Completed: 4

General characteristics
- Type: Submarine
- Displacement: 134 tons – 149 tons
- Length: 32.13 m (105 ft 5 in)
- Beam: 3.3 m (10 ft 10 in)
- Draught: 2.73 m (8 ft 11 in)
- Propulsion: 1 × 280 bhp (209 kW) diesel engine; 1 × 145 bhp (108 kW) electric motor
- Speed: 11 kn (20 km/h; 13 mph) surfaced; 8 kn (15 km/h; 9.2 mph) submerged
- Range: 500 nmi (930 km; 580 mi) at 10 kn (19 km/h; 12 mph) on the surface; 35 nmi (65 km; 40 mi) at 7 kn (13 km/h; 8.1 mph) submerged
- Complement: 10
- Armament: 2 × 18 inch bow torpedo tubes

The O 2-class submarine consisted of four submarines built by Koninklijke Maatschappij De Schelde in Flushing for the Royal Netherlands Navy. Used for patrols in the Dutch home waters. The class comprised O 2, O 3, O 4 and O 5. Its diving depth was 25 metres (80 ft); during trials with no crew on board a depth of 40 metres (130 ft) was reached.

== Construction ==
Name	Laid down	Launched	Commissioned	Decommissioned
O 2	11 October 1909	30 Januari 1911	1 December 1911	1930
O 3	31 December 1910	30 July 1912	11 February 1913	1932
O 4	15 June 1912	5 August 1913	17 June 1914	1935
O 5	15 June 1912	2 October 1913	20 August 1914	1935
