= Hardanger Sunnhordlandske Dampskipsselskap =

Norwegian privately held public transportation provider

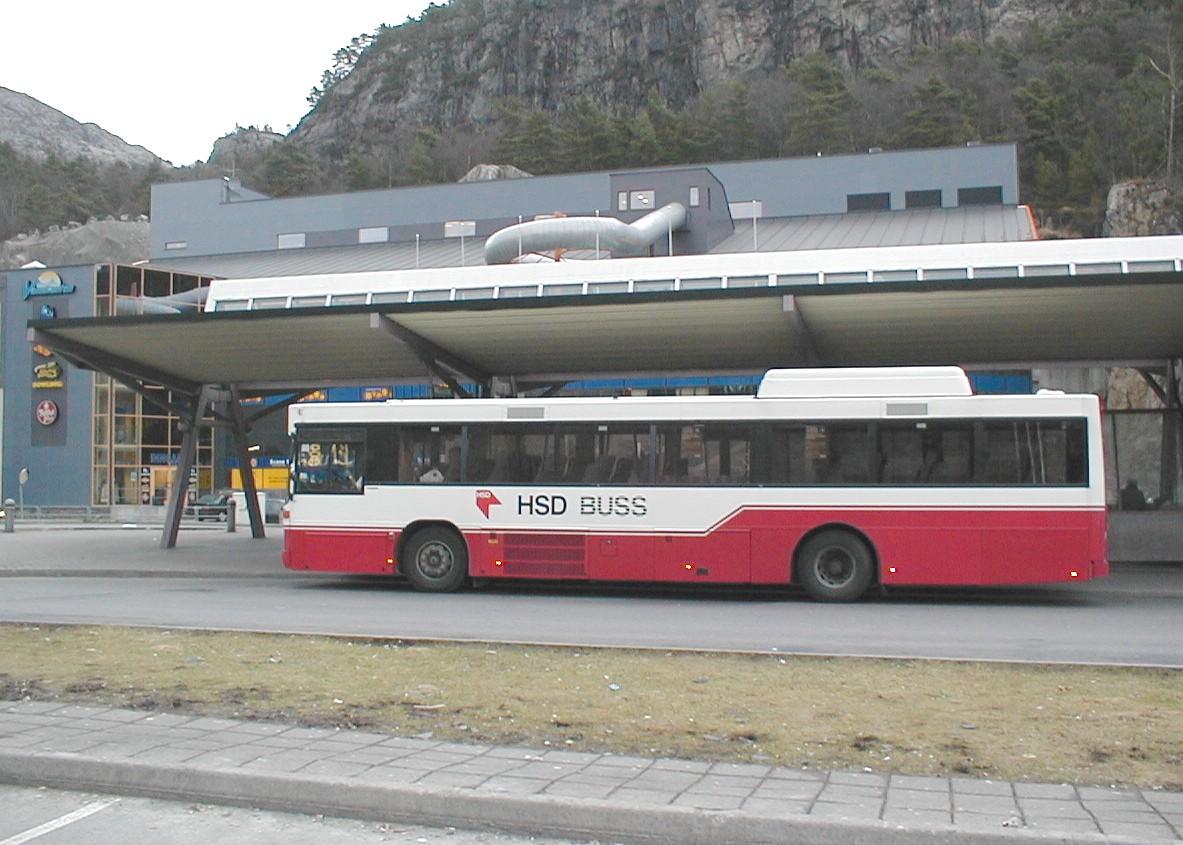
An HSD bus

Hardanger Sunnhordlandske Dampskipsselskap (HSD), founded in 1880, was one of Norway's largest privately held public transportation providers. Its bus operation HSD Buss AS was founded in 1999, and serviced 15 million passengers annually in large parts of western Norway, predominantly in Vestland. It also had a ferry service, HSD Sjø AS, transporting passengers along the west coast of Norway. The fleet consisted of 31 ferries and 10 catamarans as of 2006.

In 2006 the company merged with Gaia Trafikk forming the new company Tide.

== Vessels ==
Some of the vessels owned and operated by HSD.

- SS Stord I (1913)
- MV Granvin (1931)
- MS Sunnhordland (1947)
- MS Stord (1970)
- MS Tysnes (1970)
- MS Sleipner (1999)
